= International Socialist Bureau =

The International Socialist Bureau (French: Bureau Socialiste International) was the permanent organization of the Second International, established at the Paris congress of 1900. Before this there was no organizational infrastructure to the "Second International" beyond a series of periodical congresses, which weren't even given a uniform name. The host party of the next congress was charged with organizing it.

After the International Socialist Congress of Paris of 1900, a permanent Bureau was established which met periodically in between congresses. A permanent secretariat was also established in Brussels. There were in all 16 plenary meetings of the Bureau.

The membership of the bureau was fluid from meeting to meeting, each country sending one to three representatives at a time. Many illustrious figures of the socialist movement, and several future heads of state or government were members at one time or another.

All this information is taken from La Deuxième Internationale, 1889-1914: étude critique des sources, essai bibliographique by Georges Haupt

== Plenary meetings ==
=== 1st. Brussels; December 30, 1901 ===
Sec.	Bel.	Fr.	Br.	Ger.	Pol.	Rus.	Ne.	USA	Arg.
Victor Serwy	Edward Anseele; Emile Vandervelde	Édouard Vaillant; Alfred Léon Gérault-Richard	Henry Hyndman; Harry Quelch	Karl Kautsky; Paul Singer	Cesarine Wojnarowska	B. N. Krichevsky; Georgi Plekhanov	Hendrick Van Kol; Pieter Jelles Troelstra	George D. Herron	Achille Cambier

=== 2nd. Brussels; December 29, 1902 ===
Sec.	Bel.	Fr.	Br.	Ger.	Pol.	Rus.	Ne.	Arg.	Austria
Victor Serwy	Edward Anseele; Emile Vandervelde	Jean Jaurès; Bracke	Henry Hyndman; Sam Woods	Paul Singer	Cesarine Wojnarowska; B.A. Jedrychovski	B. N. Krichevsky; B. A. Guinzburg	Hendrick Van Kol; Pieter Jelles Troelstra	Alfred Léon Gérault-Richard	Victor Adler

=== 3rd. Brussels; July 20, 1903 ===
Sec.	Bel.	Fr.	Br.	Ger.	Pol.	Rus.	Ne.	USA	Arg.	Den.
Victor Serwy	Edward Anseele; Emile Vandervelde	Édouard Vaillant	Henry Hyndman; Hunter Watts	Wilhelm Pfankuch; Richard Fischer	Cesarine Wojnarowska	B. A. Guinzburg	Hendrick Van Kol; Pieter Jelles Troelstra	Gaylord Wiltshire	Patroni	Peter Christian Knudsen

=== 4th. Brussels; February 7, 1904 ===
Sec.	Bel.	Fr.	Br.	Ger.	Pol.	Rus.	Ne.	Arg.	Austria
Victor Serwy	Edward Anseele; Emile Vandervelde	Édouard Vaillant; Bracke; Amilcare Cipriani	Henry Hyndman; Harry Quelch	Karl Kautsky; Paul Singer	Rosa Luxemburg; Henryk Walecki	Georgi Plekhanov	Hendrick Van Kol; Pieter Jelles Troelstra	Achille Cambier	Victor Adler

=== 5th Amsterdam; August 15, 1904 ===
Sec.	Bel.	Fr.	Br.	Ger.	Pol.	Rus.	Ne.	USA	Arg.	Austria	Den.	Italy	Nor.	Boh.	Jp.
Victor Serwy	Edward Anseele; Emile Vandervelde	Édouard Vaillant; Bracke; Amilcare Cipriani	Henry Hyndman; Ernest Belfort Bax	Karl Kautsky	Rosa Luxemburg; Walecki	Georgi Plekhanov	Hendrick Van Kol; Pieter Jelles Troelstra	Morris Hillquit	Achille Cambier; Manuel Ugarte	Engelbert Perner-storfer	P. Knudsen	Enrico Ferri	Olav Kringen	Franc Soukup; Anton Nemec	Sen Katayama

=== 6th. Brussels; January 15, 1905 ===
Sec.	Bel.	Fr.	Br.	Ger.	Pol.	Rus.	Arg.	Austria	Lux.
Victor Serwy	Edward Anseele; Emile Vandervelde	Édouard Vaillant; Bracke; Amilcare Cipriani; Jean Longuet	Henry Hyndman	Karl Kautsky; August Bebel	Rosa Luxemburg	Pavel Axelrod; Roubanovitch	Achille Cambier	Victor Adler	Michel Welter

=== 7th. Brussels; March 4–5, 1906 ===
Sec.	Bel.	Fr.	Br.	Ger.	Pol.	Rus.	Arg.	Lux.	Boh.	Swiss	Hung.	Fin.
Camille Huysmans	Edward Anseele; Emile Vandervelde	Édouard Vaillant; Jean Jaurès	Henry Hyndman; J. Keir Hardie	Karl Kautsky; August Bebel	Jozef Kwiatek	Roubanovitch	Manuel Ugarte	Michel Welter	Franc Soukup; Anton Nemec	Jean Sigg	Mano Buchinger	Yrjo Sirola

Consultative members: Garske of the Workers party of Latvia and Lew of the Socialist Party of Armenia

=== 8th. Brussels; November 10, 1906 ===
Sec.	Bel.	Fr.	Br.	Ger.	Pol.	Rus. SRs	Rus. RSDRP	Boh.	Sweden	Hungary
Camille Huysmans	Edward Anseele	Édouard Vaillant	Henry Hyndman; J. Keir Hardie	Paul Singer; August Bebel	Hermann Diamand	Roubanovitch	Georgi Plekhanov; Angelica Balabanov	Franc Soukup; Anton Nemec	Hjalmar Branting	Jacob Weltner; Max Grossmann

Consultative members Stanislas Kurski; Leo Bergman of the General Jewish Labour Bund; O. Braun of the Latvian Social Democrats

=== 9th. Brussels; June 9, 1907 ===
Sec.	Bel.	Fr.	Br.	Ger.	Pol.	Rus. SRs	Rus. RSDRP	Boh.	Ne.	Lux.	Austria	Den.
Camille Huysmans	Edward Anseele; Emile Vandervelde	Édouard Vaillant; Jean Jaurès; Jean Longuet	Henry Hyndman; Bruce Glasier	Paul Singer; August Bebel	Hermann Diamand	Roubanovitch	Martov; Angelica Balabanov	Franc Soukup; Anton Nemec	Hendrick Van Kol; Pieter Jelles Troelstra	Michel Welter	Victor Adler	C. M. Olsen

Consultative members Stanislas Kurski; Leo Bergman of the General Jewish Labour Bund; O. Braun of the Latvian Social Democrats

=== 10th. Brussels; October 10, 1908 ===
Sec.	Bel.	Fr.	Br.	Ger.	Austria	Pol.	Rus. SRs	Rus. RSDRP	Rus. "SERP"	Rus. "URP"	Boh.	Ne.	Sweden	Italy	Den.	Hung.	Bulg.	Arm.	Lat.	Bund.
Camille Huysmans	Edward Anseele; Leon Furnemont; Louis de Brouckere	Édouard Vaillant; Angele Roussel; Jean Longuet	Henry Hyndman; Bruce Glasier	Hermann Molkenbuhr	Victor Adler	Hermann Diamand; Karl Kautsky	Roubanovitch	Lenin	Chaim Zhitlowsky	Pereverzev	Franc Soukup; Anton Nemec	Hendrick Van Kol	Hjalmar Branting	Garatti	Thorvald Stauning	Mano Buchinger	Avramoff	Varandian	K. Sutte	B. Nelin; G. Borski

=== 11th. Brussels; November 7, 1909 ===
Sec.	Bel.	Fr.	Br.	Ger.	Pol.	Rus.	Boh.	Ne.	Lux.	Austria	Den.	Hu.	USA	Arg.	Swed.	Bulg.	Sp.
Camille Huysmans	Edward Anseele; Emile Vandervelde	Édouard Vaillant; Jules Guesde; Jean Longuet	Keir Hardie; Harry Quelch; G. H. Roberts	Paul Singer; Hermann Molkenbuhr	Hermann Diamand; Adolf Warski; Wronsky	Roubanovitch; Lenin; C. Sutte	Franc Soukup; Anton Nemec	Hendrick Van Kol; Pieter Jelles Troelstra	Michel Welter	Victor Adler	P. Knudsen; Thorvald Stauning	Ernő Garami	Victor Berger; Kretlow	Achille Cambier	Hjalmar Branting	Breitko Loukov	Fabra Ribas

=== 12th. Copenhagen; August 26–31, September 2–3, 1910 ===
Sec.	Bel.	Fr.	Br.	Ger.	Pol.	Rus.	Boh.	Ne.	Austria	Den.	Hu.	USA	Swed.	Bulg.	Rom.	Serb.	Turk.	Fin.	Nor.
Camille Huysmans	Edward Anseele; Emile Vandervelde; Leon Furnemont	Édouard Vaillant; Guesde; Jean Jaurès; Angele Roussel	Ramsay MacDonald	Friedrich Ebert; Hermann Molkenbuhr	Hermann Diamand; Karl Kautsky	Roubanovitch; Lenin; T. Medem	Franc Soukup; Anton Nemec	Hendrick Van Kol; Pieter Jelles Troelstra	Victor Adler; Engelbert Perner-storfer; Engelbert; Ferdinand Skaret	P. Knudsen; Thorvald Stauning	Mano Buchinger	Daniel De Leon; Morris Hillquit; Victor Berger	Hjalmar Branting; CGT Wickman	Yanko Sakazov; Georgi Kirkov	Racovsky	Tucovic	Varandian	Yrjo Sirola; Vaino Tanner	Einar Li; Magnus Nilssen

=== 13th. Zurich; September 23–24, 1911 ===
Sec.	Bel.	Fr.	Br.	Ger.	Pol.	Rus.	Ne.	Swiss.	Austria	Serb.	Italy	Hung.	Boh.	Turk.
Camille Huysmans	Edward Anseele; Emile Vandervelde; Leon Furnemont	Édouard Vaillant; Angele Roussel; Jean Longuet	Harry Quelch	Hermann Molkenbuhr; August Bebel	Rosa Luxemburg; Hermann Diamand	Georgi Plekhanov; Lenin	Pieter Jelles Troelstra	Sgragen; Karl Moor; Bruestein	Victor Adler	Tucovic	Pompeo Ciotti	Mano Buchinger	Franc Soukup; Anton Nemec	Saul Nahum

=== 14th. Brussels; October 28–29, 1912 ===
Sec.	Bel.	Fr.	Br.	Ger.	Pol.	Rus.	Ne.	Swiss.	Austria	Rom.	Italy	Hung.	Boh.	Turk.	Swiss.	Sw.	Den.
Camille Huysmans	Edward Anseele; Emile Vandervelde; Leon Furnemont	Édouard Vaillant; Angele Roussel; Jean Longuet	Harry Quelch; Bruce Glasier; F. W. Goldstone	Hermann Molkenbuhr; Karl Kautsky; Hugo Haase	Rosa Luxemburg; Hermann Diamand	Georgi Plekhanov; Roubanovitch; Merkel	Pieter Jelles Troelstra	Sgragen; Karl Moor; Bruestein	Victor Adler	Racovsky	G. Agnini; Angelica Balabanov	E. Garami; J. Weltner	Franc Soukup; B Kolar	Saul Nahum	Fritz Stunder	Branting	Carl Madsen; Thorvald Stauning

=== 15th. London; December 13–14, 1913 ===
Bel.	Fr.	Br.	Ger.	Pol.	Rus.	Ne.	Swiss.	Austria	Rom.	Italy	Hung.	Boh.	USA	Sw.	Den.	Nor.	Arg.
Edward Anseele; Emile Vandervelde; Camille Huysmans; Louis Bertrand	Édouard Vaillant; Jean Jaurès; Jean Longuet	"a large delegation from the British...parties"	Hermann Molkenbuhr; Karl Kautsky; Friedrich Ebert	Rosa Luxemburg; Hermann Diamand; Lapinski	Tcheidze; Roubanovitch; Litvinov	Vliegen	Fritz Stunder	Victor Adler	Racovsky	G. Agnini; Angelica Balabanov	Mano Buchinger	Franc Soukup; B Kolar	Kate Richards O'Hare	Branting	Thorvald Stauning	Jacob Vidnes	Ramon Saint-Marie

=== 16th. Brussels; July 29–30, 1914 ===
Sec.	Bel.	Fr.	Br.	Ger.	Pol.	Rus.	Ne.	Swiss.	Austria	Rom.	Italy	Hung.	Boh.	Sw.	Den.	Arg.
Camille Huysmans	Edward Anseele; Emile Vandervelde; Louis Bertrand	Édouard Vaillant; Jean Jaurès; Jean Longuet; Jules Guesde; Marcel Sembat	Keir Hardie; Bruce Glasier; Dan Irving	Hugo Haase; Karl Kautsky; Rosa Luxemburg	Walecki	Pavel Axelrod; Roubanovitch; Winter; O. Braun	Troelstra	R. Grimm; Karl Moor	Victor Adler; Friedrich Adler	Racovsky	Angelica Balabanov; Oddino Morgari	Mano Buchinger	Bohumil Nemec	Branting	Thorvald Stauning	Fabras; Corales

== First World War ==
In autumn 1914, shortly after the occupation of most of Belgium by German troops, the executive committee decided to move the headquarters from Brussels to the Hague, with the approval of the Belgian Labor Party. The all Belgian Executive Committee also unanimously decided to expand itself by adding three Dutch members, Troelstra, Van Kol and Albarda, with Vleigen and Wibaut as alternates. Camille Huysmans, a Belgian, remained Secretary. This arrangement was approved by all of the affiliated parties, except the French party which decline to vote, believing that the International should have stayed "where it was and what it was".

In the early months of the war the Executive Committee resisted efforts to call a full meeting of the Bureau, feeling that it would have been impossible to get delegates from certain countries together and feeling that an unrepresentative meeting might mean the dissolution of the International altogether. In January and February 1915 the BSI attempted to hold a series of separate, one-on-one meetings with representatives of the parties in belligerent nations. The French refused to send a delegation to the Hague. The British were at first willing, but opted out after Arthur Henderson became a member of the War Cabinet. The Belgians were the first to send a delegation, and the German party met with the executive twice.

The BSI was pointedly hostile to the Zimmerwald Conference. At a speech to the congress of the Dutch party Huysmans ridiculed the Zimmerwaldians for their impatience, as well as for the unrepresentative and "amateur" nature of the conference. Huysmans later reportedly made special trips to Britain and France to dissuade socialists in those countries from attending the Kienthal Conference. Partly in response to Zimmerwald and Kienthal, though, the Bureau arranged for a meeting of socialists from the neutral countries. Originally scheduled for June 23, 1916 this conference finally met at the Hague on July 30-August 2, 1916. Consisting of nine delegates from Argentina, the United States (Algernon Lee), the Netherlands, Denmark and Sweden, the conference passed a resolution expressing confidence in the Executive Committee and deprecating any effort to break up the official International

In April 1917, after the March Revolution in Russia, Stauning of Denmark wrote to the BSI stating that if they were unable to summon a general conference of Socialist parties, it would be organized without them. Upon getting this appeal the Dutch members of the Executive Committee left for Stockholm. Huysmans soon joined them setting up the secretariat of the Bureau at the Trade Union House of the Swedish Socialist Party. On May 2 Huysmans and Engberg became the Secretariats representative in a new organization, the Dutch-Scandinavian Committee which attempted to convene a general socialist conference at Stockholm for the remainder of 1917, without success.

In November 1918 Huysmans worked in concert with the committee appoint by the fourth Inter-Allied Socialist Conference for the convening of a socialist conference of the formerly belligerent nations. The final result of this was the Berne Conference of 1919.

== See also ==
- Neutral Socialist Conferences during the First World War
- International Socialist Commission
