= Michael Puntervold =

Norwegian lawyer and politician

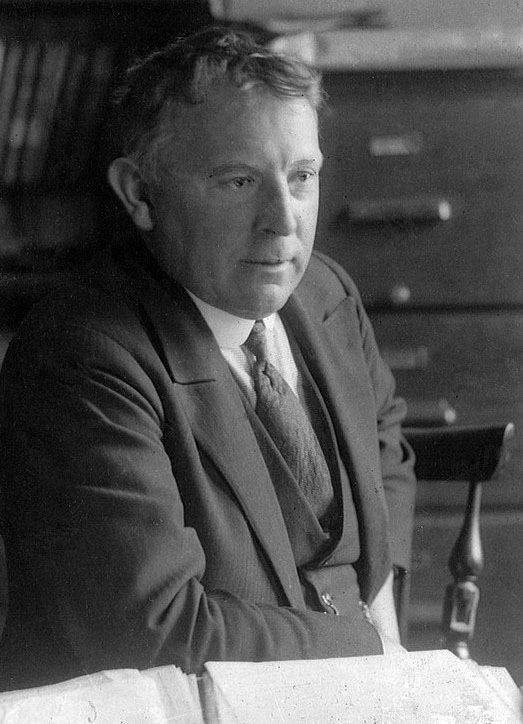
Michael Puntervold

Michael Puntervold (4 September 1879 – 4 August 1937) was a Norwegian lawyer and politician for the Labour and Social Democratic Labour parties.

== Personal life ==
He was born in Grimstad as a son of Karl Gustav Puntervold (1828–1920) and Francisca Maria Falch, née Landmark (1845–). His father was a seamen's school manager in Grimstad until 1885, when he was appointed as head quartermaster officer of the Royal Norwegian Navy in Horten. His father's lineage hailed from Eigersund Municipality and his mother was from Jølster Municipality where her father served as bailiff. On his mother's side he was a first cousin of Ole and Hjørdis Landmark.

In September 1908 in Kristiania he married merchant's daughter Anna Pedersen Øyjord from Øyjord. The couple had three daughters, born between 1909 and 1916.

== Career ==
Puntervold finished middle school in Horten i 1895, and finished his secondary education at Kristiania Cathedral School in 1898. After doing military service, he returned to Horten where he taught at the middle school from 1899 to 1901. After spending the year 1902 in Alta, he moved to Narvik in 1903. He was the manager of the middle school here, co-founded and chaired the local chapter of the Labour Party and edited the party newspaper Fremover for a short time. From 1904 to 1910 he was a journalist in the Kristiania newspaper Social-Demokraten. Alongside his journalism he studied law at the Royal Frederick University. He was active in the Norwegian Students' Society and the Norwegian Student Choral Society, among others on three concert tours.

After graduating with a cand.jur. degree in 1906 he worked as an attorney in Kristiania. He was a part-time law partner of Carl Bonnevie from 1907 to 1909, then independently from 1910 and in partnership with Brynjulf Wangen from 1912. From 1914 he was a barrister with access to working with Supreme Court cases.

He became an important person in the labour movement in 1904 when publishing the pamphlet Antimilitarismen via Norges Socialdemokratiske Ungdomsforbund. It was the first "comprehensive theoretical reasoning" behind the Labour Party's military policy at the time: skepticism to the current military while wanting the working people to take up arms. In the early 1900s he published agitative pamphlets named Militarismen ("The Militarism") and Klassekampen ("The Class Struggle"). He also agitated for a Norwegian republic; in 1905 he issued a draft for a new, republican Constitution of Norway together with Nikolaus Gjelsvik, Johan Scharffenberg and Solnørdal. In 1919 Puntervold published I Lenins land ("In Lenin's Country"), a travel account from the newly established Russian Soviet Federative Socialist Republic. He travelled together with Emil Stang, Jr. as a representative of the Norwegian Confederation of Trade Unions.

Puntervold resided in Kristiania until 1906, when he moved to Bækkelaget in Aker Municipality. He was elected to the municipal council of Aker Municipality from 1911 to 1916 and the school board from 1915 to 1919. He was fielded as Labour's candidate in the constituency Aker in the 1909 Norwegian parliamentary election. He lost clearly to Conservative Edvard Hagerup Bull with 2,589 against 3,607 votes. In 1918 the party tried to field him as the candidate in neighboring constituency Bærum og Follo, but he lost clearly to Christian Fredrik Michelet with 3,823 against 5,880 votes. He did carry a majority in two sub-constituencies, Oppegaard and Son.

Puntervold placed himself on the right wing of the party, which held control of the party by and large until 1918. In 1920 he was more or less denounced by Edvard Bull, Sr. who wrote in Det 20de Aarhundre of "right-wing socialism and puntervoldery". When the Labour Party split in 1921, Puntervold joined the more right-wing Social Democratic Labour Party, and became a leading figure in this party. Writing in Arbeider-Politikken, he was a part of the early supporters of such a new party. He was also chairman of Arbeider-Politikken, which became the official party newspaper, from 1920 to 1927. He took part at the founding congress of the Labour and Socialist International in 1923; the other Norwegian delegates were Magnus Nilssen, Arne Magnussen and Olav Kringen.

He belonged to the Labour Party again from 1927, but gradually backed out of active politics. He is known for having a personal relation with Lenin and later served as a lawyer for Leon Trotsky during his exile in Norway. Several letters between Leon Trotsky and Michael Puntervold are stored in the Harvard Library.
