= Arne Magnussen =

Norwegian politician

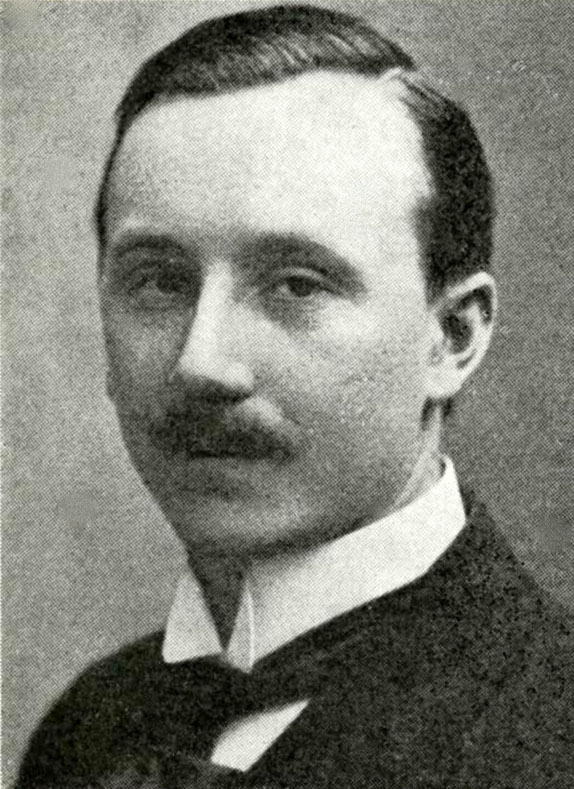
Arne Magnussen.

Arne Magnussen (31 March 1884 – 3 September 1970) was a Norwegian trade unionist, newspaper editor and politician for the Labour and the Social Democratic Labour parties.

He was elected to the Parliament of Norway from the urban constituency of Moss og Drøbak in 1919. In 1921, when the Social Democratic Labour Party split away from the Labour Party, he joined the Social Democrats and was re-elected in the newly created constituency Market towns of Østfold and Akershus. He was re-elected on one occasion in 1924, but not on the next occasion in 1927. In 1930, having rejoined the Labour Party, he was elected for the last time, and sat through the term which ended in 1933.

Born in Moss as the son of a school teacher, he started his career as a mail and newspaper carrier. He eventually became involved in making the newspapers, as editor-in-chief of Moss Socialdemokrat from 1913. He founded Ekstrabladet in 1920, which upon the party split in 1921 became a local organ for the Social Democratic Labour Party. It was later renamed Moss Arbeiderblad. He was editor-in-chief of that newspaper from 1922 until the party reconciliation in 1927. He then worked in the Labour Party newspaper Moss og Omegn Arbeiderblad until 1933. He chaired the trade union Norwegian Postal Organization, a forerunner of Postkom, from 1919 to 1923. He took part at the founding congress of the Labour and Socialist International in 1923; the other Norwegian delegates were Magnus Nilssen, Michael Puntervold and Olav Kringen.

In 1933 he became burgomaster of Moss city. He had been a member of the city council from 1910 to 1933, serving as deputy mayor in 1916-1918, 1930 and 1931–1933 and as mayor from 1922 to 1925. In 1939 his title was renamed rådmann (chief administrative officer). He stayed in this position until after the Second World War, with a break from 1 May 1944 to January 1946. He was also a member of several public committees, including the school board and the poor relief. He was also a member of the National Impeachment Court (Riksrett) during the 1926–1927 impeachment case against Abraham Berge.

Magnussen was also active in the temperance movement. He died in 1970.
