= Saxlund =

Saxlund is a Norwegian surname.

== Notable people ==
Notable people with this surname include:

- Alf Eivind Saxlund (1890–1973), Norwegian military officer and barrister
- Eivind Saxlund (1858–1936), Norwegian lawyer and writer
- Susana Saxlund (born 1957), Uruguayan former swimmer
