= Einar Li =

Norwegian politician (1880–1955)

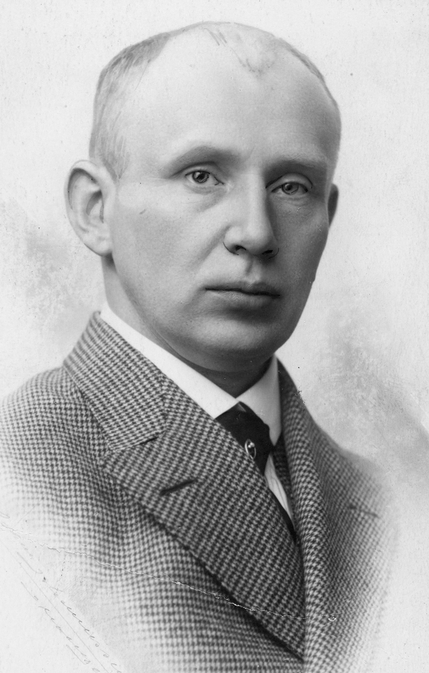
- Born: 20 June 1880; Bergen, Vestland
- Died: 11 February 1955 (aged 74)
- Burial place: Vestre Aker Church

Einar Li (20 June 1880 – 11 February 1955) was a Norwegian newspaper editor and politician for the Labour and Social Democratic Labour parties. He was also known as a conscientious objector, for which he received prison sentences.

== Biography ==
He was born in Bergen as a son of Lieutenant Colonel John Herman Lie (1840–1923) and Petra Jensine Thaulow Klouman (1844–1925). In 1908 he married Amalie Marie Hansen.

He became known as a conscientious objector, a pioneer as such outside of the religious community. For refusing to enter military training in the summer of 1906, he was sentenced to ninety days of prison in November 1906. He appealed to the Military Supreme Court, but the sentence was upheld on 15 February 1907. Later in 1907 he refused again, and was arrested in November. This time he received a sentence of one year in prison, the most harsh sentence to any conscientious objector in Norway at the time. When he refused to enter the military service for the third time, in the spring of 1908, the prosecuting authority gave up. About 1,400 people honored him in public when he was released.

== Political and professional career ==
He attended studies in economics in Oxford, Brussels and Paris. He took the examen artium in Norway in 1904. He was a journalist in the Kristiania newspaper Social-Demokraten from 1901 to 1909, and sat on the editorial board of the Labour Party's periodical Det 20de Aarhundre. He then edited Den 1ste Mai in Stavanger from 1909 to 1916. While living in Stavanger he was a member of the city council's executive committee from 1914 to 1916. He was also a delegate to the International Socialist Bureau.

When the Labour Party split in 1921, Li joined the more right-wing Social Democratic Labour Party. When the parties reunited in 1927 he rejoined the Labour Party, but later resigned his membership.

In 1916 he was hired as office manager in Stavanger municipality. His responsibility was the city's statistical office, population register and pension scheme. From 1917 he was also responsible for provisioning. In 1919 he became the director of the Union of Norwegian Cities, which he did not leave until retiring from professional life in 1945. He also edited the magazine Kommunalt tidsskrift during this period.

Li was also a co-founder of the housing cooperative Oslo Havebyselskap, which he chaired from 1921 to 1945. He issued a book on Ullevål Hageby, one such housing cooperative, in 1942. He also headed the Norges kooperative Landsforening's control committee from 1926 to 1936, and was a board member of the cooperative insurance company Forsikringsselskapet Samvirke from 1925 to 1945 and Samvirkebanken from 1936 to 1945.

Li chaired the Norwegian Specialized Press Association from 1933 to 1945, the Norwegian Library Association from 1937 to 1945, was a secretary of Norsk Havneforbund from 1932 to 1945 as well as Den norske Kurstedsforening after the war, and was a board member of Norsk forening for boligreformer (1928–1945) Norges Badeforbund. He was also the auditor of the Polytechnic Society from 1933 to 1945.

He was decorated as a Knight, First Class of the Order of the White Rose of Finland and the Order of Vasa, and a Knight of the Order of Dannebrog. He died in February 1955 and was buried at Vestre Aker.
