= Magnus Nilssen =

Norwegian politician (1871–1947)

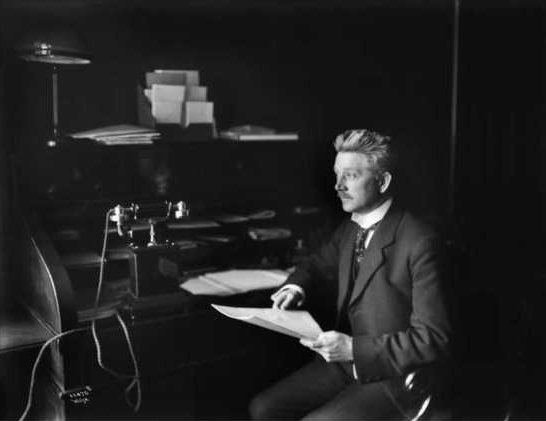
- Nilssen in 1921.

Vice President of the Storting
- In office 21 March 1935 – 3 December 1945
- President: C. J. Hambro
- Preceded by: C. J. Hambro
- Succeeded by: Gustav Natvig-Pedersen

Minister of Labour
- In office 28 January 1928 – 15 February 1928
- Prime Minister: Christopher Hornsrud
- Preceded by: Worm Darre-Jenssen
- Succeeded by: Ole M. Mjelde

President of the Lagting
- In office 1 January 1919 – 31 December 1921
- Preceded by: Andreas Kristian Andersen Grimsø
- Succeeded by: Gunder A. Jahren

Leader of the Social Democratic Labour Party
- In office 1921–1927
- Preceded by: Position established
- Succeeded by: Position abolished

Member of the Norwegian Parliament
- In office 1 January 1928 – 4 December 1945
- Constituency: Oslo
- In office 1 January 1907 – 31 December 1921
- Constituency: Kristiania

Party Secretary for the Labour Party
- In office 1901–1918
- Leader: Christian H. Knudsen; Christopher Hornsrud; Oscar Nissen
- Preceded by: Olav Strøm (1894)
- Succeeded by: Martin Tranmæl

Personal details
- Born: 18 July 1871 Lillehammer, Oppland, Sweden-Norway
- Died: 20 November 1947 (aged 76) Oslo, Norway
- Party: Labour; Social Democratic Labour
- Spouse: Inga Marie Ravneberg (m. 1897)

Magnus Nilssen (18 July 1871 – 20 November 1947) was a Norwegian politician for the Labour and Social Democratic Labour parties.

He was born in Lillehammer as a son of shoemaker Mathias Nilssen (1834–1920) and his wife Eline Pedersen (1835–1918). He was a first cousin of Marcus Halfdan Kastrud. He finished his apprenticeship as a goldsmith in 1889, and moved to Kristiania in the same year. He was a secretary in his local trade union from 1891 to 1892 and treasurer in 1893. He was also member of the socialist youth club Friheden in both Kristiania and Sarpsborg (where he lived in 1894). He started his own goldsmith business in 1897. In November the same year he married Inga Marie Ravneberg.

He joined the Norwegian Labour Party, and became a member of the central board in 1900. From 1901 to 1918 he was the party secretary. He lost out when "the new direction" became dominant in 1918. "The new direction" had tried to replace him with Alfred Madsen at the national convention in 1915. In 1921 he quit the central board to co-found a new party, the Social Democratic Labour Party of Norway. He chaired this party throughout its existence, from 1921 to 1927. He took part at the founding congress of the Labour and Socialist International in 1923; the other Norwegian delegates were Arne Magnussen, Michael Puntervold and Olav Kringen.

Nilssen was a member of Kristiania (Oslo) city council from 1902 to 1910, 1914 to 1919 and 1926 to 1928. To the Parliament of Norway he was elected for the first time in the 1906 Norwegian parliamentary election. He represented his city. He was re-elected eight times, to serve a total of nine terms in Parliament. There was a hiatus between 1922 and 1927; he was never elected to Parliament for the Social Democratic Labour Party. He served as President of the Lagting from 1919 to 1921 and Vice President of the Storting from 1935 to 1945. After the reunion of Labour and Social Democratic Labour in 1927, he rejoined the Labour Party central board, this time as deputy party leader. The party had two deputy leaders—Nilssen and Edvard Bull, Sr.—to accommodate different wings within the party. Nilssen also served as Minister of Labour in the two-week Hornsrud's Cabinet between January and February 1928.

He left as deputy leader in 1939, and left the central board in 1945. His last term in Parliament ended in 1945—de facto with a hiatus from 1940 to 1945, when Germany occupied Norway and suspended Parliament. Nilssen participated in the Riksråd negotiations in 1940 between Germans and those parliamentarians who had not fled the country, in which the Presidium asked King Haakon VII to abdicate. During the remainder of the occupation, Nilssen lost all his public positions. After the occupation and war, he was dropped by the Labour Party as their member of the Presidium, and was not summoned to the relevant meetings and forums. Fredrik Monsen was the party's new member of the Presidium.

Nilssen was a member of the supervisory committee of the Gjøvik Line from 1908 to 1919, and of the supervisory council of Norges Brannkasse. He was a school board member in Oslo from 1910 to 1922 and 1929 to 1937, and a board member of the Norwegian State Railways from 1922 and Oslo Hospital from 1933. He was a deputy board member of the Institute for Comparative Research in Human Culture from 1938 to 1940, and a deputy member of the Norwegian Nobel Committee from 1922 to 1940.

Nilssen died in November 1947 in Oslo.

Party political offices
Preceded by Olav Kringen	Party secretary of the Labour Party; 1901–1918	Succeeded by Martin Tranmæl
Preceded by position created	Chairman of the Social Democratic Labour Party; 1921–1927	Succeeded by position abolished
Political offices
Preceded by Worm Hirsch Darre-Jenssen	Minister of Labour; January 1928–February 1928	Succeeded by Ole Monsen Mjelde
