= Moss Arbeiderblad =

Norwegian newspaper

Moss Arbeiderblad was a Norwegian newspaper, published in Moss in Østfold county. It was affiliated with the Social Democratic Labour Party of Norway.

Moss Arbeiderblad was started on 13 November 1920 as Ekstrabladet. In 1921, when the Social Democratic Labour Party broke away from the Norwegian Labour Party, the newspaper sided with the former party. The name was changed to Moss Arbeiderblad in July 1922. In 1927 the Social Democratic Labour Party reconciled with the Labour Party, and the two parties again became one. At the same time, Moss Arbeiderblad was absorbed into the local Labour Party newspaper Folkets Blad, which was published under the new name Moss og Omegn Arbeiderblad. Its editor-in-chief throughout its existence was politician Arne Magnussen.
