= Maxim Litvinov =

Soviet diplomat and foreign minister (1876–1951)

- Максим Литвинов
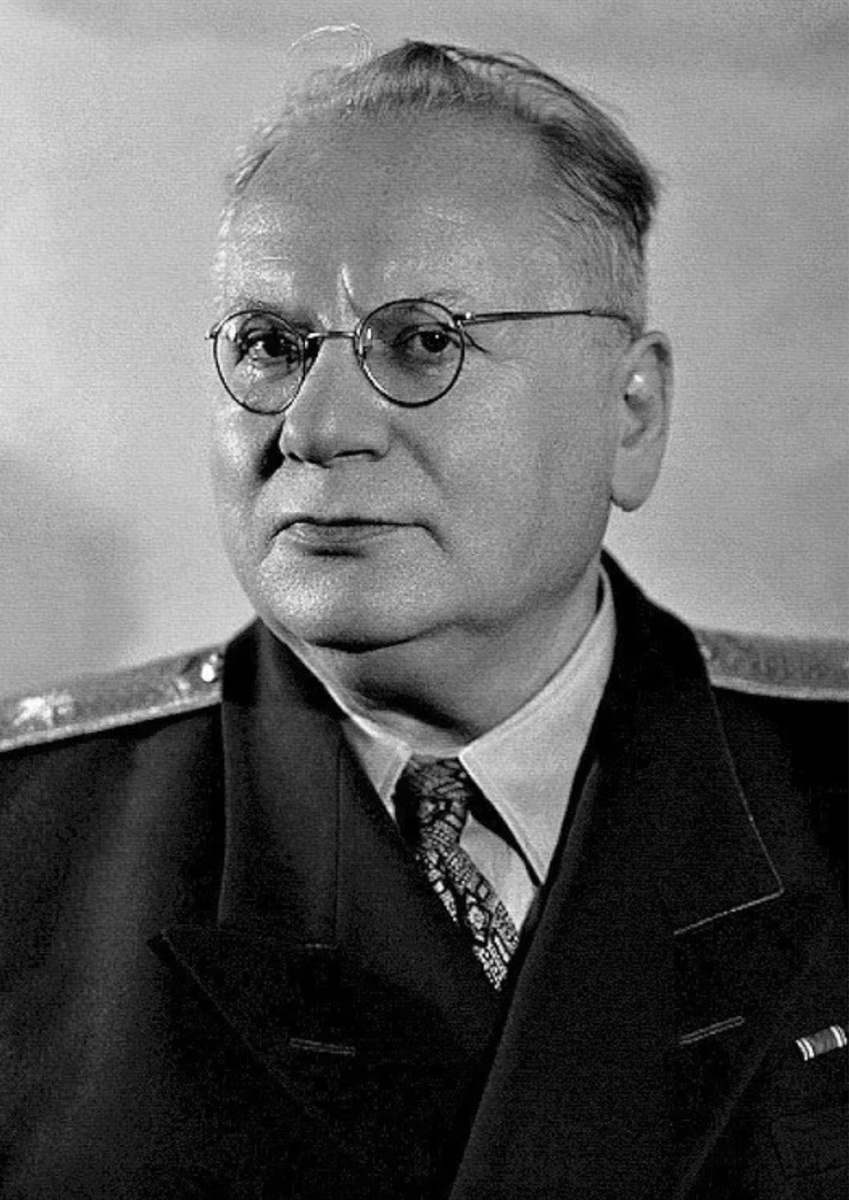
- Official portrait, 1946

Soviet Ambassador to the United States
- In office 10 November 1941 – 22 August 1943
- Premier: Joseph Stalin
- Preceded by: Konstantin Umansky
- Succeeded by: Andrei Gromyko
- In office 1918–1919
- Premier: Vladimir Lenin
- Preceded by: Boris Bakhmeteff
- Succeeded by: Ludwig Martens

People's Commissar for Foreign Affairs of the Soviet Union
- In office 21 July 1930 – 3 May 1939
- Premier: Alexei Rykov; Vyacheslav Molotov
- Preceded by: Georgy Chicherin
- Succeeded by: Vyacheslav Molotov

Personal details
- Born: Meir Henoch Mojszewicz Wallach-Finkelstein; 17 July 1876 Białystok, Russian Empire
- Died: 31 December 1951 (aged 75) Moscow, Russian SFSR, Soviet Union
- Party: RSDLP (1898–1903); RSDLP (Bolsheviks) (1903–1918); Russian Communist Party (1918–1951)
- Spouse: Ivy Litvinov
- Relatives: Pavel Litvinov (grandson), Nina M. Litvinova (granddaughter)
- Profession: Diplomat, civil servant

Maxim Maximovich Litvinov (Russian pronunciation: [mɐkˈsʲim mɐkˈsʲiməvʲɪtɕ lʲɪˈtvʲinəf]; born Meir Henoch Wallach-Finkelstein; 17 July 1876 – 31 December 1951) was a Russian revolutionary and prominent Soviet statesman and diplomat who served as People's Commissar for Foreign Affairs from 1930 to 1939.

Litvinov was an advocate for diplomatic agreements leading to disarmament, and was influential in making the Soviet Union a party to the 1928 Kellogg–Briand Pact. He was also responsible for the 1929 Litvinov Protocol, a multilateral agreement to implement the Kellogg-Briand Pact between the Soviet Union and several neighboring states.

In 1930, Litvinov was appointed People's Commissar of Foreign Affairs, the highest diplomatic position in the USSR. During the 1930s, Litvinov advocated the official Soviet policy of collective security with Western powers against Nazi Germany.

== Early life and first exile ==
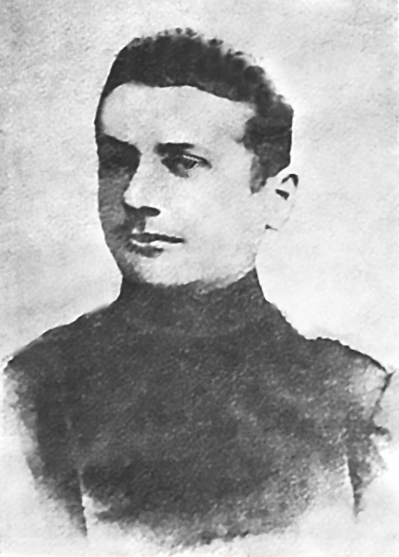
Maxim Litvinov in 1896

Meir Henoch Wallach was born into a wealthy, Yiddish-speaking, Lithuanian Jewish banking family in Białystok, Grodno Governorate, Russian Empire. Meir was the second son of Moses and Anna Wallach. In 1881, Moses Wallach was arrested, held in prison for six weeks, then released without charge. Meir was educated at a local realschule; in 1893 he joined the army but was discharged in 1898 after he allegedly disobeyed an order to fire into a crowd of striking workers in Baku. That year, in Kiev, Wallach joined the Russian Social Democratic Labour Party (RSDLP), which was considered an illegal organization; it was customary for its members to use pseudonyms. Meir changed his name to Maxim Litvinov—a common Litvak surname—but was also known as "Papasha" and "Maximovich". Litvinov also wrote articles under the names "M.G. Harrison" and "David Mordecai Finkelstein".

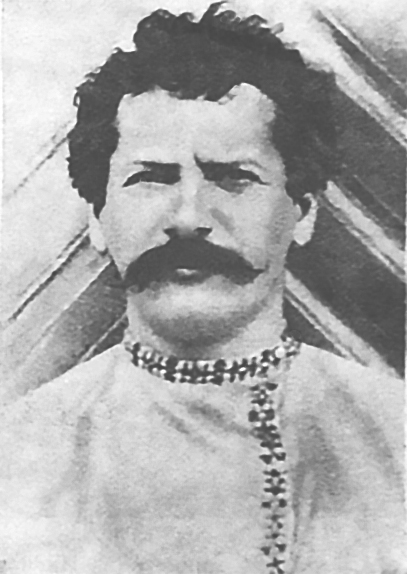
Litvinov in 1902

Litvinov's early responsibilities included propaganda work in the Chernigov Governorate. In 1900, Litvinov became a member of the Kiev party committee, all of whom were arrested in 1901. After 18 months in custody, Litvinov and Nikolay Bauman organised a mass escape of 11 inmates from Lukyanivska Prison, overpowering a warden and using ropes and grappling irons to scale the walls. Litvinov moved to Geneva, where the founder of Russian Marxism, Georgi Plekhanov, enlisted him as an agent of the revolutionary newspaper Iskra. Litvinov organised a route to smuggle the newspaper from Germany into Russia.

In July 1903, Litvinov was in London for the party's second congress when the RSDLP split. He became a founding member of the Bolshevik faction under Vladimir Lenin, whom Litvinov first met in the British Museum Reading Room. The two went to Hyde Park to hear some of the speeches, and remained in contact with each other during this period. Litvinov returned to Russia during the 1905 Revolution, when he became editor of the RSDLP's first legal newspaper Novaya Zhizn in Saint Petersburg.

== Second emigration ==
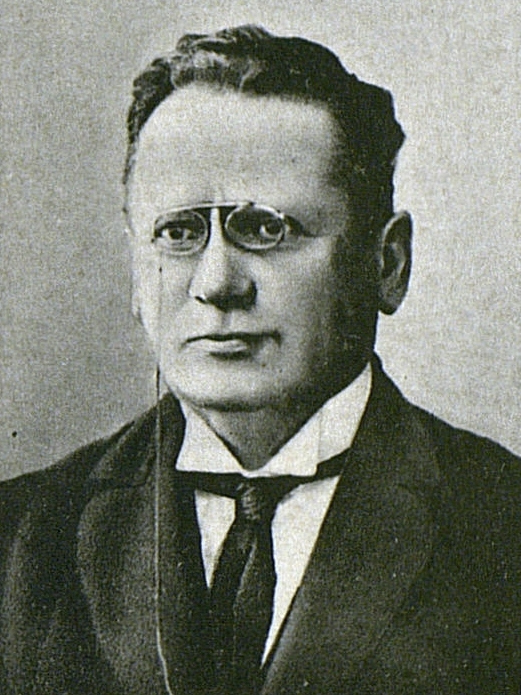
Litvinov in 1905

When the Russian government began arresting the Bolsheviks in 1906, Maxim Litvinov left the country and spent the next ten years as an émigré and arms dealer for the party. He based himself in Paris and travelled throughout Europe. Posing as an officer in the Ecuadorian Army, he bought machine guns from the State Munitions Factory in Denmark, and posing as a Belgian businessman, he bought more weapons from Schroeder and Company of Germany. He then arranged for the whole consignment to be transported to Bulgaria, where he told the authorities the arms were destined for Macedonian and Armenian rebels fighting for independence in the Ottoman Empire. Litvinov then bought a yacht, and handed it and the weapons to the Armenian revolutionary Kamo to be smuggled across the Black Sea. The yacht, however, ran aground and the weapons were stolen by Romanian fishermen. Despite this setback, Litvinov successfully smuggled other shipments of these arms into Russia via Finland and the Black Sea.

In 1907, Litvinov attended the fifth RSDLP congress in London. Initially, he relied on Rowton Houses for accommodation in London but the party eventually arranged a rented house for Litvinov, which he shared with Joseph Stalin, who also wanted to find more-comfortable housing than the Rowton hostels.

In January 1908, French police arrested Litvinov under the name Meer Wallach while carrying twelve 500-ruble banknotes that had been stolen in a bank robbery in Tiflis the year before. The Russian government demanded his extradition and the French Minister for Justice Aristide Briand ruled Litvinov's crime was political and ordered him to be deported. He went to Belfast, Ireland, where he joined his sister Rifka and her family. There, he taught foreign languages in the Jewish Jaffe Public Elementary School until 1910.

Litvinov moved to England in 1910 and lived there for eight years. In 1912, he replaced Lenin as the Bolshevik representative on the International Socialist Bureau. When the First World War broke out in 1914, the Russian government requested all Russian émigrés who were in allied England and eligible for military service return to serve in the Imperial Russian Army. Litvinov was able to convince the English officer who interviewed him that he would be tried rather than conscripted if he returned to Russia.

In February 1915, Litvinov, uninvited, attended a conference of socialists from the Triple Entente that included Keir Hardie, Ramsay MacDonald and Emile Vandervelde; and the Mensheviks Yuri Martov and Ivan Maisky. Lenin prepared a statement demanding every socialist who held a government post should resign and opposing the continuation of the war. The conference chairman refused to allow Lenin to finish speaking. In the wake of this mainstream social-democratic endorsement of "defensive warfare", Litvinov along with the rest of the exiled Bolsheviks in western Europe remained an outspoken public opponent of the war.

In England, Litvinov met and in 1916 married Ivy Low, the daughter of a Jewish university professor.

== Diplomatic career ==
Universal Newsreel about the visit of Soviet Foreign Minister Maxim Litvinov to the United States in 1933

=== First Soviet representative to Britain ===
On 8 November 1917, a day after the October Revolution, the Council of People's Commissars (Sovnarkom) appointed Maxim Litvinov as the Soviet government's plenipotentiary representative in the United Kingdom. His accreditation was never officially formalised and his position as an unofficial diplomatic contact was analogous to that of Bruce Lockhart, Britain's unofficial agent in Soviet Russia. Litvinov was allowed to speak freely, even after the Treaty of Brest-Litovsk, which took Russia out of the war.

In January 1918, Litvinov addressed the Labour Party Conference, praising the achievements of the Revolution. Alexander Kerensky, second and last leader of the republican Russian Provisional Government that had been previously installed after the abdication of the Tsar and was in turn overthrown by Lenin, was welcomed by the British government on a visit to London and also addressed the Labour Party Conference, criticising the dictatorship and repression of Lenin's government. Litvinov replied to Kerensky in the left-wing English press, criticising him as being supported by foreign powers and accused him of trying to restore Tsarism.

A mutiny took place in February 1918 on a Russian ship in the River Mersey. The police, having been warned of possible trouble, had the ship under surveillance. When shouts that the crew were threatening to kill their officers were heard, the ship was boarded and the crew were arrested. Shortly before the mutiny, a police report confirmed Litvinov had received the sailors very well. Litvinov had not tried to dissuade the sailors from carrying out the mutiny or to condemn it, and may have encouraged it. Litvinov also sought interviews with British, American, Australian and Canadian soldiers, and inculcated them with Bolshevik ideas, as well as inducing British and American soldiers of Jewish descent to carry on propaganda in their regiments. On one occasion, thirty Royal Engineers, along with some American and Canadian soldiers, were received in Litvinov's office.

At the end of 1917, Litvinov had secured the release of Georgy Chicherin from Brixton prison, but in September 1918, the British government arrested Litvinov, ostensibly for having addressed public gatherings held in opposition to British intervention in the ongoing Russian Civil War. Litvinov was held until he was exchanged for R.H. Bruce Lockhart, who had been similarly imprisoned in Russia.

Following his release, Litvinov returned to Moscow, arriving there at the end of 1918. He was appointed to the governing collegium of the People's Commissariat of Foreign Affairs (Narkomindel) and immediately dispatched on an official mission to Stockholm, Sweden, where he presented a Soviet peace appeal. Litvinov was subsequently deported from Sweden but spent the next months as a roving diplomat for the Soviet government, helping to broker a multilateral agreement allowing the exchange of prisoners of war from a range of combatants, including Russia, the UK and France. This successful negotiation amounted to de facto recognition of the new revolutionary Russian government by the other signatories to the agreement and established Litvinov's importance in Soviet diplomacy.

Litvinov tried to intervene in Britain's internal politics, agreeing to the request of the Daily Herald, a newspaper supporting the Labour Party, to ask the Soviet government for financial assistance. In view of the publicity caused by a leak in The Times, the Daily Herald did not accept the money.

=== Irish contacts and the Anglo-Soviet Trade Agreement ===
In February 1921, the Soviet government was approached by the government of the unilaterally declared Irish Republic in Dublin with proposals for a treaty of mutual recognition and assistance. Despairing of early American recognition for the Irish Republic, President of the Dáil Éireann Éamon de Valera had redirected his envoy Patrick McCartan from Washington to Moscow. McCartan may have assumed Litvinov, with his Irish experience, would be a ready ally. Litvinov, however, told McCartan the Soviet priority was a trade agreement with the UK.

In March 1921, the Anglo-Soviet Trade Agreement, authorising trade between the two countries so gold sent to Britain to pay for goods could not be confiscated, was signed but the British government and the British press began to complain about Moscow-directed subversion. In June, the British government published a proposed treaty between the Dáil government and the Soviets, and related correspondence; the question of Communist intrigue in the Irish War of Independence made headlines.

Finally, the British Foreign Secretary, Lord Curzon sent a note of protest to the Soviet Government, charging it with responsibility for a range of intrigues against the British Government and its imperial interests. Litvinov replied that "The British Foreign Office has been misled by a gang of professional forgers and swindlers, and had it known the dubious sources of its information, its note of 7 September [1921] would never have been produced", stating that the complaints of anti-British activities were in part based on such fictitious reports. The Russian Government wished to state that, after the conclusion of the Anglo-Russian agreement, it had instructed its representatives in the East to abstain from any anti-British propaganda, although on its part it felt compelled to place on record that the attitude of the British Government had lately been far from friendly towards Russia. He cited the imprisonment and expulsion of Russian trade agents in Constantinople, the co-operation with the French Government in the so-called ‘Russian question’, the continued support to French schemes frustrating international efforts to help relieve famine in Russia, and lastly the presentation of the British note of 7 September. At a time when France was inciting Poland and Rumania to make war on Russia, this did not induce the Russian Government to believe that it was the sincere desire of the British Government to foster friendly relations between the governments and peoples of the two countries.

=== First Deputy People's Commissar of Foreign Affairs ===
In 1921, Litvinov was appointed First Deputy People's Commissar of Foreign Affairs, second in command to People's Commissar Georgy Chicherin (1872–1936). Although both men were loyal to the Soviet regime, Litvinov and Chicherin were temperamental opposites and became rivals. Chicherin had a cultivated, polished personal style but held strongly anti-Western opinions. He sought to hold Soviet Russia aloof from diplomatic deal-making with capitalist powers. According to diplomatic historian Jonathan Haslam, Litvinov was less erudite and coarser than Chicherin but was willing to deal in good faith with the West for peace and a pause for Soviet Russia to pursue internal development.

In 1924, full diplomatic relations were restored under the MacDonald Labour government. The Conservative Party and the business community continued to be hostile to the Soviet Union, partly because the Soviet Union had not honoured Tsarist debts and partly because of the fear of Bolshevism spreading to Britain, and considered the Bolshevist government should be militarily overthrown. This was exacerbated by the Soviet government's support of the 1926 General Strike and criticism of the British Trades Union Congress (TUC) for calling off the strike. The Soviet government offered a gift of £25,000 to the TUC, which was refused, and £200,000 to the co-operative movement, which was accepted.

Litvinov wanted to prevent a deterioration of relations and suggested he should have talks with Hodgson, the UK's chargé d'affaires in Moscow. Hodgson, who was privately sympathetic to some of Litvinov's complaints, communicated with the Foreign Office, giving various reasons for criticising Britain's position. Britain had signed a trade agreement in 1921 and given the Soviet Government de jure recognition in 1923, and HM Government had recently indicated that it intended to maintain its relationship with the Soviet Government. Anti-red outbursts could prejudice its position in dealing with problems that needed discussion with the Soviet Government. Importantly, the Soviet Union, whatever her political complexion, was a badly needed market. Although anti-red sentiment might be useful in the political warfare at home, it was seen in Russia as an admission of weakness. However, most pressing, was the incalculable commercial harm. The insecurity would make the Soviet Government hesitant about placing orders in Britain, cause British firms to fight shy of Russian orders and frighten British banks from financing them.

The Conservative government, under pressure from Conservative MPs on the uncorroborated evidence of a dismissed employee that the Soviet Trade Mission had stolen a missing War Office document, successfully asked Parliament to sever diplomatic relations with the Soviet Union. Although Chicherin advocated caution, Litvinov, presumably with Joseph Stalin's support, said:

The decision was no surprise to the Soviet Government. It had already for long been aware that a rupture of diplomatic relations with the Union of Soviet Socialist Republics was being prepared by the whole policy of the present British Conservative Government, which has declined all proposals of the Soviet Government for the settlement of mutual relations by means of negotiations. The lack of results of the search of the Trade Delegation premises, which was carried out with utmost thoroughness over several days, is the most convincing proof of the loyalty and correctitude of the official agents of the Union of Socialist Soviet Republics. The Soviet Government passes over with contempt the insinuations of a British Minister regarding espionage by the Trade Delegation and considers it beneath its dignity to reply to them. The Soviet Government places on record that the British Government had no legitimate ground for a police raid on the extraterritorial premises of the official Soviet agent.

Hodgson agreed with Litvinov that the police raid on the Arcos building in London was deplorable and said so in a letter to The Times in 1941, showing his pleasure at Litvinov's appointment as Soviet ambassador to the United States.

After the Labour Party won the most seats in the 1929 election, the new Prime Minister, Ramsay MacDonald, set about restoring relations with the Soviet Union on condition that the Soviet Union refrained from initiating propaganda in Britain. Litvinov was in favour of being conciliatory, but letters between Joseph Stalin and Vyacheslav Molotov show Stalin overruled Litvinov's conciliatory attitude, resulting in British Foreign Secretary Arthur Henderson ignoring problems rather than working towards an effective agreement on propaganda, effectively giving unconditional recognition to the Soviet Union.

=== Proponent of disarmament ===
Litvinov supported disarmament, actively attending the Disarmament Preparatory Commission from 30 November 1927 until it was replaced by the World Disarmament Conference in Geneva in 1932. Initially he advocated total disarmament. French politician Joseph Paul-Boncour criticised such proposals:

Supposing you had total disarmament; if there was no international organisation taking charge of security, if you had no international force to ensure the maintenance of this security, if you had no international law such as we are endeavouring to lay down here, a powerful and populous nation would always have the power when it wished to do so on a small nation equally disarmed, less populous and less well equipped to resist an attack which might be made upon it.

Litvinov's answer was:

Would small nations be less insecure after their powerful neighbours who have disarmed than they are now when, in addition to economic, financial, territorial and other superiorities possessed by the great powers, the latter also enjoy the immense advantage of greater armaments.

Litvinov's proposals won him favourable publicity in radical circles in Western countries that were eager for disarmament and impatient at the commission's slow progress. The national joint Council of the Labour Party, the Parliamentary Labour Party and the TUC passed a resolution expressing their sense of the great importance of proposals for general-and-simultaneous disarmament submitted by the Soviet delegation at the Commission in Geneva on 30 November 1927.

Litvinov favoured Soviet participation in the Kellogg-Briand Pact of 1928, which pledged signatories to the elimination of the use of war as a tool of foreign policy, a position opposite to that of his nominal superior Chicherin. Litvinov, who was frustrated by the failure of the Kellogg-Briand Pact signatories to ratify the treaty, proposed the Litvinov Protocol, in which signatories formally proclaimed themselves in mutual compliance with the pact's goals. The protocol was signed in Moscow in February 1929 by the Soviet Union, Poland, Romania, Latvia, and Estonia, and later by several other countries.

== People's Commissar of Foreign Affairs ==
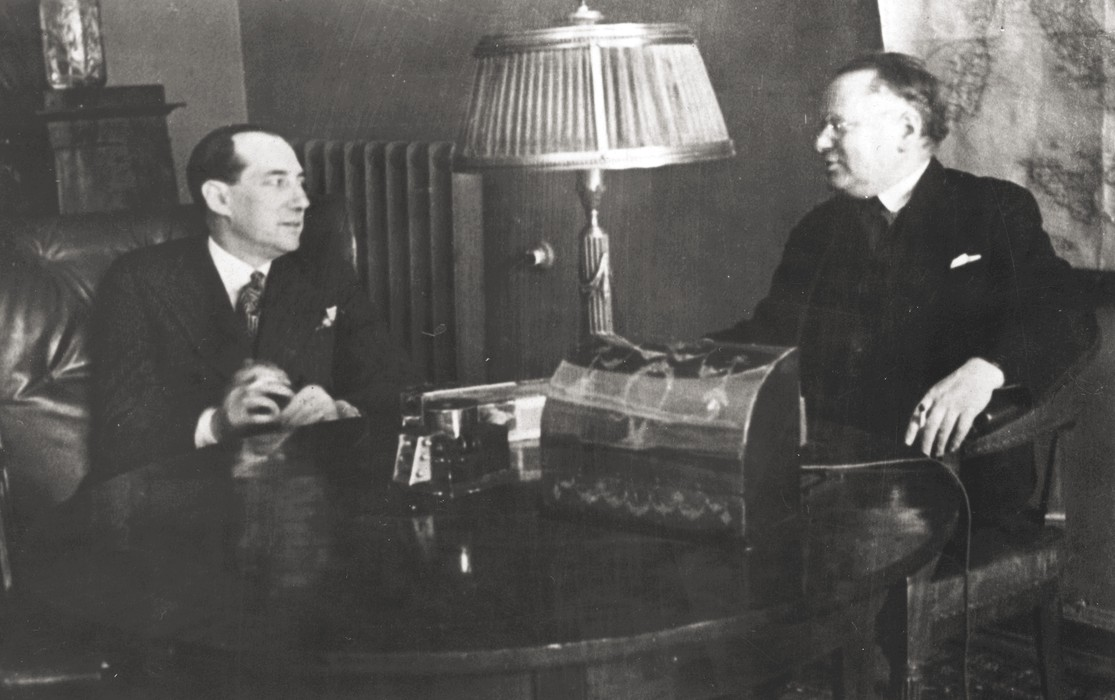
Poland's Foreign Minister Józef Beck and Maxim Litvinov in February 1934

In 1930, Joseph Stalin appointed Litvinov People's Commissar for Foreign Affairs. Litvinov, who was a firm believer in collective security, worked to form a closer relationship with France and the United Kingdom, a policy seemingly at odds with the "class against class" line of the Third Period being advocated by the Communist International. Litvinov remained the only leading official of Narkomindel in the mid-1930s who had direct personal access to Stalin and who could deal with Stalin's inner circle on terms approaching equality; this was in contrast to other top foreign-affairs officials such as Boris Stomonyakov and Nikolay Krestinsky, for whom access was limited to occasional supplication.

Stalin was largely detached from and uninterested in foreign policy throughout the early 1930s, largely leaving the general operations of Narkomindel and the Comintern to their leaders. Litvinov had wide latitude to pursue policy objectives and was subject only to broad review and approval from the leadership. Stalin frequently delegated oversight to members of his personal secretariat, including Karl Radek, until mid-1936. As a result, Litvinov's Narkomindel could pursue a moderate foreign-policy line, emphasising stable relations between governments leading towards general disarmament, which was, as one historian called it, a "curious mismatch" with the revolutionary militancy then being voiced by the Comintern.

On 6 February 1933, Litvinov made the most-significant speech of his career, in which he tried to define aggression. He stated that the internal situation of a country, alleged maladministration, possible danger to foreign residents, and civil unrest in a neighbouring country were not justifications for war. In 1946, the British Government would accuse the Soviet Union of not complying with Litvinov's definition. Finland made similar criticisms against the Soviet Union in 1939.

Many delegates, such as British delegate Lord Cushendun, who said the failure of the Disarmament Conference would be gratifying to the Soviet delegation, derided Litvinov but due to the soundness of Litvinov's argument and eloquence, his standing grew. In 1933, the Greek Chairman of the Political Commission of the League of Nations stated:

It was with special pleasure he paid this tribute to the Soviet delegation since it demonstrated beyond doubt that when men rose above the contingencies of day-to-day politics and allowed themselves to be guided by the more general ideas which should lead the civilised world, it was found that there was a community of ideals which was capable with a little goodwill of bringing to fruition the noblest and most difficult enterprises.

In 1933, Litvinov was instrumental in winning a long-sought formal diplomatic recognition of the Soviet government by the United States. US President Franklin Roosevelt sent comedian Harpo Marx to the Soviet Union as a goodwill ambassador. Litvinov and Marx became friends and performed a routine on stage together. Litvinov also facilitated the acceptance of the Soviet Union into the League of Nations, where he represented his country from 1934 to 1938.

In 1935, Litvinov negotiated the Franco-Soviet Treaty of Mutual Assistance and another treaty with Czechoslovakia with the aim of containing Nazi Germany's aggression. Writing in A History of the League of Nations (1952), F. P. Walters expressed "astonished admiration", praising Litvinov's farsighted analysis:

No future historian will lightly disagree with any views expressed by Litvinov on international questions ... Nothing in the annals of the League can compare with them in frankness, in debating power, in the acute diagnosis of each situation. No contemporary statesman could point to such a record of criticisms justified and prophecies fulfilled.

Litvinov has been considered to have concentrated on taking strong measures against Italy, Japan and Germany, and being little interested in other matters. He praised the achievements of the Soviet Union but he may not have agreed with collective farming. At the time of the Moscow Trials, Litvinov was appointed to a committee that decided the fate of Bukharin and Rykov, voting for them to be expelled and tried but not executed, they were eventually handed to the NKVD. During the Great Purge, the Foreign Commissariat lacked ambassadors in nine capitals; Litvinov reported this to Stalin, noting the damage without criticising the cause. Indeed, Litvinov publicly endorsed the purges and the campaign against the Trotskyites, although this may have been out of self-preservation.

== Negotiations regarding Germany and dismissal ==
After the 1938 Munich Agreement, German state media derided Litvinov for his Jewish ancestry, referring to him as "Finkelstein-Litvinov". On 15 April 1939, Litvinov sent a comprehensive proposal to Stalin for a tripartite agreement with Britain and France. The following day, Litvinov saw Stalin to discuss his draft, which Stalin approved. According to Soviet records, Litvinov submitted detailed arguments in favour of the proposed pact, which Stalin accepted. Litvinov stated they ought not to wait for the other side to propose what the Soviets wanted. Litvinov summarised his proposals, which were for mutual assistance in case of aggression against the Soviet Union, Britain or France; and support for all states bordering the Soviet Union, including Finland and the Baltic States. It also provided for rapid agreement on the form such assistance would take. There would be an agreement not to conclude a separate peace.

By 16 April, Stalin still had faith in Litvinov and had no immediate plans to remove him. No concrete proposals for a Nazi-Soviet pact had been made by either country. Litvinov said: "We can expect urgent and complex negotiations with the French and especially the British. We need to monitor public opinion and try to influence it." The new proposals had Stalin's support; Litvinov summoned the British Ambassador, William Seeds, while he was at the theatre with his wife. Litvinov could have had the proposals conveyed to the Embassy with a request for Seeds to visit Litvinov urgently in the morning.

Litvinov had a poor opinion of Neville Chamberlain, and was not surprised Russia's proposal for an alliance was not welcomed, but he may have been surprised by the attitude of the British Foreign Office. Alexander Cadogan, in his diary, described Litvinov's proposals as "mischievous". A Foreign Office report to the Foreign Affairs Cabinet Committee termed them 'inconvenient'. On 7 June 1939, Winston Churchill stated he "much preferred the Russian proposals. They are simple. They are logical and conform to the main groupings of common interest." Churchill also stated the Soviet claim the Baltic States should be included in the triple guarantee was well founded. Three years later, Britain would agree a similar pact of assistance with the Soviet Union. Litvinov's proposals were also conveyed to the French Ambassador Émile Naggiar.

As soon as the proposals reached the French Government, the first reaction of Georges Bonnet, the Foreign Minister, was different from that of the British Government and Foreign Office. Bonnet saw the Soviet Ambassador Jakob Suritz, who cabled that "the first impression of the French is very favourable". Britain persuaded the French Government to take no action until a common policy had been formulated. In talks between the French and the British governments, both failed to either accept or reject the proposals until after Litvinov's dismissal on 4 May. Molotov proceeded with negotiations for a pact and a military mission left for Moscow.

The Foreign Office confirmed to the US chargé d'affaires on 8 August 1939 "the military mission, which had now left for Moscow, had been told to make every effort to prolong discussions until 1 October 1939". Lord Halifax, the British Foreign Secretary, disclosed to the Foreign Affairs Committee on 10 July 1939: "Although the French were in favour of the military conversations commencing, the French Government thought that the military conversations would be spun out over a long time and as long as they were taking place we should be preventing Soviet Russia from entering the German camp."

=== Dismissal ===
On 3 May 1939, Stalin replaced Litvinov, who was closely identified with the anti-German position, with Vyacheslav Molotov. At a prearranged meeting, Stalin said: "The Soviet Government intended to improve its relations with Hitler and if possible sign a pact with Nazi Germany. As a Jew and an avowed opponent of such a policy, Litvinov stood in the way." Litvinov argued and banged on the table. Stalin then demanded Litvinov to sign a letter of resignation. On the night of Litvinov's dismissal, NKVD troops surrounded the offices of the Commissariat of Foreign Affairs. The telephone at Litvinov's dacha was disconnected and the following morning, Molotov, Georgy Malenkov, and Lavrenty Beria arrived at the commissariat to inform Litvinov of his dismissal. Many of Litvinov's aides were arrested and beaten, possibly to extract compromising information.

Hitler took Litvinov's removal more seriously than Chamberlain. The German ambassador to the Soviet Union, Schulenburg, was in Iran. Hilger, the First Secretary, was summoned to see Hitler, who asked why Stalin might have dismissed Litvinov. Hilger said: "According to my firm belief he [Stalin] had done so because Litvinov had pressed for an understanding with France and Britain while Stalin thought the Western powers were aiming to have the Soviet Union pull the chestnuts out of the fire in the event of war".

Litvinov was not in disgrace; he continued to attend official functions and carry out his duties as a member of the Supreme Soviet and the Central Committee.

Litvinov also attended the Supreme Soviet when the budget was presented and on the occasion of Molotov's speech in support of the Nazi–Soviet Pact. There was no praise or recognition of Litvinov's work after he had held the position of Foreign Minister for nine years. Two months later, when Litvinov applied for a passport to go to Vichy, France, to take the waters, it was refused, presumably on the grounds he might defect or abscond.

According to Louis Fischer, "Litvinov never by hint or word approved of Stalin's pact with Hitler". Ivy Litvinov stated: "the Nazi-Soviet Pact had not inspired her husband with much confidence". Litvinov would not have been surprised if Germany had broken any agreement and would have ensured the USSR would have been well prepared for a German invasion of its territory.

=== Aftermath of dismissal ===
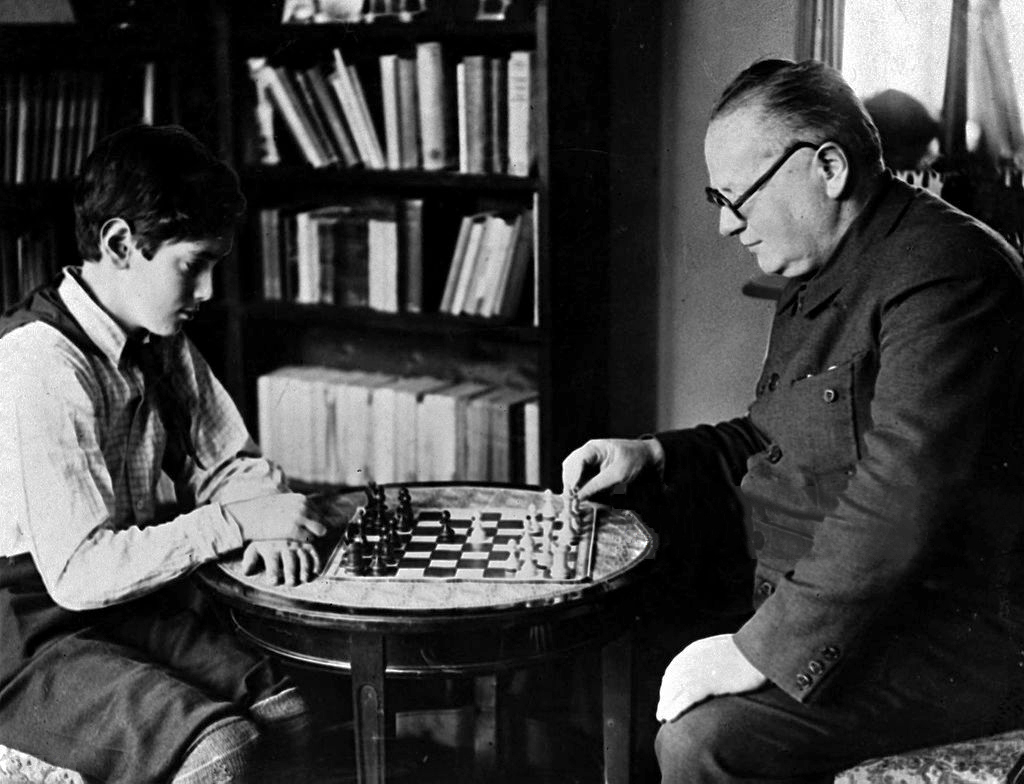
Litvinov playing chess with his son Misha in 1936

According to Holroyd-Doveton, Litvinov, if he had been Foreign Commissar, would have approved the Pact. Sheinis states when foreign correspondents first asked Litvinov about the Pact, he evaded the question, but then said: "I think this calls for a closer look, because among other things enemies of the Soviet Union ascribe to me what I never said". Litvinov is reported to have told Ehrenburg: "The Pact was absolutely necessary". He told foreign journalists:

The imperialists in these two countries had done everything they could to goad Hitler's Germany against the Soviet Union by secret deals and provocative moves. In the circumstances the Soviet Union could either accept German proposals for a non-aggression treaty and thus secure a period of peace in which to redouble preparations to repulse the aggressor; or turn down Germany's proposals and let the warmongers in the Western camp push the Soviet Union into an armed conflict with Germany in unfavourable circumstances and in a setting of complete isolation. In this situation the Soviet Government was compelled to make the difficult choice and conclude a non-aggression treaty with Germany. I, too, would probably have concluded a pact with Germany although a bit differently.

Litvinov's replacement by Molotov significantly increased Stalin's freedom to manoeuver in foreign policy. The dismissal of Litvinov, whose Jewish background was viewed disfavorably by Nazi Germany, removed an obstacle to negotiations with Germany. Stalin immediately directed Molotov to "purge the ministry of Jews". Recalling Stalin's order, Molotov commented: "Thank God for these words! Jews formed an absolute majority in the leadership and among the ambassadors. It wasn't good."

Given Litvinov's prior attempts to create an anti-fascist coalition, association with the doctrine of collective security with France and Britain, and pro-Western orientation by Kremlin standards, his dismissal indicated the existence of a Soviet option of rapprochement with Germany. Molotov's appointment was a signal to Germany the USSR would negotiate. The dismissal also signaled to France and Britain the existence of a potential negotiation option with Germany. One British official wrote Litvinov's disappearance meant the loss of an admirable technician or shock-absorber, while Molotov's modus operandi was "more truly Bolshevik than diplomatic or cosmopolitan".

With regard to the signing of the Molotov–Ribbentrop Pact with secret protocols partitioning Eastern Europe between Germany and the USSR three months later, Hitler told military commanders; "Litvinov's replacement was decisive, because Litvinov was a Jewish". A German official told the Soviet Ambassador Hitler was pleased Litvinov's replacement Molotov was not Jewish. Hitler also wrote to Benito Mussolini that Litvinov's dismissal demonstrated the Kremlin's readiness to alter relations with Berlin, which led to "the most extensive nonaggression pact in existence". When Litvinov was asked about the reasons for his dismissal, he replied; "Do you really think that I was the right person to sign a treaty with Hitler?"

American historian Jeffrey Herf views Litvinov's dismissal and the Molotov–Ribbentrop Pact as conclusive proof the Nazi belief in a Jewish conspiracy that supposedly controlled the governments of the Soviet Union and other allied powers was completely false.

=== Wartime career ===
Following the Nazi–Soviet Pact, although given little official Soviet recognition, Stalin continued to respect Litvinov. The British Embassy records confirm Litvinov was conspicuous at the 1939 anniversary of the Revolution by Lenin's Mausoleum. He was standing on the edge of a group that included Stalin, Molotov, Kaganovich, Mikoyan, Andreyev, Beria, and Dimitrov. Litvinov was in full view of the diplomatic stand of foreign journalists, some of whom had no hesitation in exchanging salutations with Litvinov. The New York Times said about thirty members of the German Trade delegation, the German Military Attaché, and members of a Finnish delegation watched the parade. The emergence of Litvinov wearing his usual flat cap was apparently a source of interest to the German delegation near the tomb; it was Litvinov's first public appearance for several months in the company as Stalin's entourage. Litvinov was also in a conspicuous place at the 1940 celebration of the Russian Revolution. According to Holroyd-Doveton, no meaningful position was allotted by Stalin to Litvinov.

In the 21-month period between the declaration of war by France and Britain, and the invasion of the Soviet Union by Germany, Ivy Litvinov describes this period of her life. She said the family spent their time with their daughter-in-law in their dacha 27 kilometres (17 miles) from Moscow and outside school holidays in the family apartment in Moscow, when they spent long weekends in the country. For two years, the family played bridge, read music, and went on long walks in the countryside with their two dogs.

On 21 February 1941, Litvinov was dismissed from the Central Committee of the Communist Party on the pretext of his inability to discharge his obligations as a member of the committee. According to Pope, he was dismissed because Stalin wanted to give no offence to the Germans. Litvinov said: "My more than 40 years in the Party oblige me to say what I think about what has happened. I do not understand why I am being dealt with in such a peremptory style."

Stalin rejected everything Litvinov had said. When Stalin stopped speaking, Litvinov asked: "Does that mean you consider me an enemy of the people?" Stalin answered: "We do not consider you an enemy of the people, but an honest revolutionary".

Litvinov had followed with anxiety the steady advance of Hitler's armies across Europe and wondered how long Britain could hold out unsupported. Even to Litvinov, the German invasion of the Soviet Union was a surprise; he did not believe Hitler would risk embarking on a second front at this stage of the war.

=== German invasion of the USSR ===
The Soviet leaders, as well as Litvinov, were concerned Britain might come to an agreement with Germany. Litvinov was worried Rudolf Hess's flight meant Britain was about to make peace with Germany. Litvinov stated all believed the British fleet was steaming up the North Sea for a joint attack with Germany on Leningrad and Kronstadt. The same day the German invasion of the USSR began, Churchill announced Britain's intention to give full aid to the Soviet Union. When Litvinov heard of Churchill's broadcast, he was much relieved. Nevertheless, Litvinov was suspicious of the British aristocracy.

== Ambassador to the United States and later ==
Early in November 1941, Litvinov was summoned to see Stalin and told his services were required as ambassador to the United States. In the US, the appointment was met with enthusiasm. The New York Times stated: "Stalin has decided to place his ablest and most forceful diplomat and one who enjoys greater prestige in this country. He is known as a man of exceptional ability, adroit as well as forceful. It is believed that Stalin, in designating him for the ambassadorship, felt Litvinov could exercise real influence in Washington." President Roosevelt stated Litvinov's appointment was "most fortunate that the Soviet Government have deemed it advisable to send as ambassador a statesman who has already held high office in his own country".

When Litvinov arrived in the US, growing Soviet resistance to the German army, which was racing to take Moscow before the onset of the Russian winter, was winning the Soviet Union supporters. According to The Washington Post:

Both Mrs Cordell Hull, the Secretary of State's wife, and the Vice-President's wife, Mrs Wallace, had travelled to the Soviet Embassy for celebrations to mark the 24th anniversary of the Soviet Revolution in 1941, where they were greeted by Mr and Mrs Gromyko and Mrs Umansky. The Under Secretary of State, Sumner Welles, Jessie Jones, the Commercial Secretary, and Francis Biddle, the Attorney General, were also present. Most foreign countries except Spain and Finland were represented.

Like Churchill, Litvinov had had doubts about the Munich Agreement. Following the Nazi invasion of the Soviet Union, Litvinov said in a radio broadcast to Britain and the United States: "We always realized the danger which a Hitler victory in the West could constitute for us". After the United States entered the war, he encouraged President Franklin D. Roosevelt to focus on the Mediterranean and Middle East theatre to prevent Axis forces in North Africa from advancing towards the Caucasus.

Litvinov immediately gained popularity and was instrumental in lobbying for billions of dollars' worth of Lend-Lease military and humanitarian assistance from the United States to the Soviet Union. In early December 1941, the Soviet Union's war-relief organisation called a large meeting in Madison Square, New York City, where the auditorium was filled to capacity. Litvinov, speaking in English, told of the suffering in the Soviet Union. A woman in the front row ran up to the stage and donated her diamond necklace; whilst another gave a cheque for $15,000. At the end, Litvinov said; "What we need is a second front".

The highlight of Litvinov's eighteen months as ambassador was the 25th celebration of the Russian Revolution on 7 November 1942. 1,200 guests, representing all of the United Nations, entered the reception hall to shake hands with Litvinov. Only the US president and his staff, at work on the African campaign, were missing. The Russians were happy they had more serious affairs with which to attend. Vice President Henry Wallace, Secretary of the Treasury Morgenthau, Under Secretary of State Sumner Welles and Mrs Woodrow Wilson, Edward Stettinius—the Lend-Lease administrator—and Tom Connolly, chairman of the Senate Foreign Relations Committee, were among the guests. Russian vodka and a sturgeon from the Volga were supplied to the guests.

The following day, Litvinov and his wife travelled to New York to attend celebrations. The New York Times on 8 November said Madison Square was overflowing with a wildly cheering crowd of 20,000 for the annual tribute to the Soviet Union in Litvinov's presence. The event was attended by Wallace, General Lesley McNair, commanding general of Army Ground Forces, capitalist Thomas Lamont, and Catholic professor Francis McMahon, who said: "not speaking up for Russia would be disloyal to his religion and country".

Roosevelt became annoyed with Litvinov's second-front zeal; he told Averell Harriman: "The US might ask for Litvinov's recall". Harriman told Litvinov Roosevelt was upset but did not repeat what the President had said. Harriman said: "If Litvinov continued that way, he would get into serious difficulties with the President. Litvinov, who had been ebullient, collapsed so completely." Litvinov's ambassadorship was now experiencing difficulties. Litvinov said the Soviet Government had forbidden him from appearing in public or making any public speeches.

After returning to Soviet Union, Litvinov became deputy minister for foreign affairs. He was dismissed from his post after an interview given to Richard C. Hottelet on 18 June 1946 in which he said a war between the West and the Soviet Union was inevitable.

== Death and legacy ==
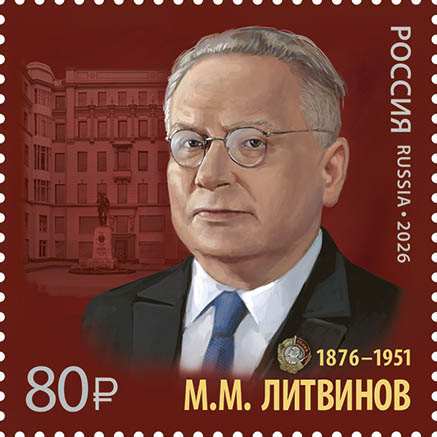
Litvinov on a 2026 stamp of Russia

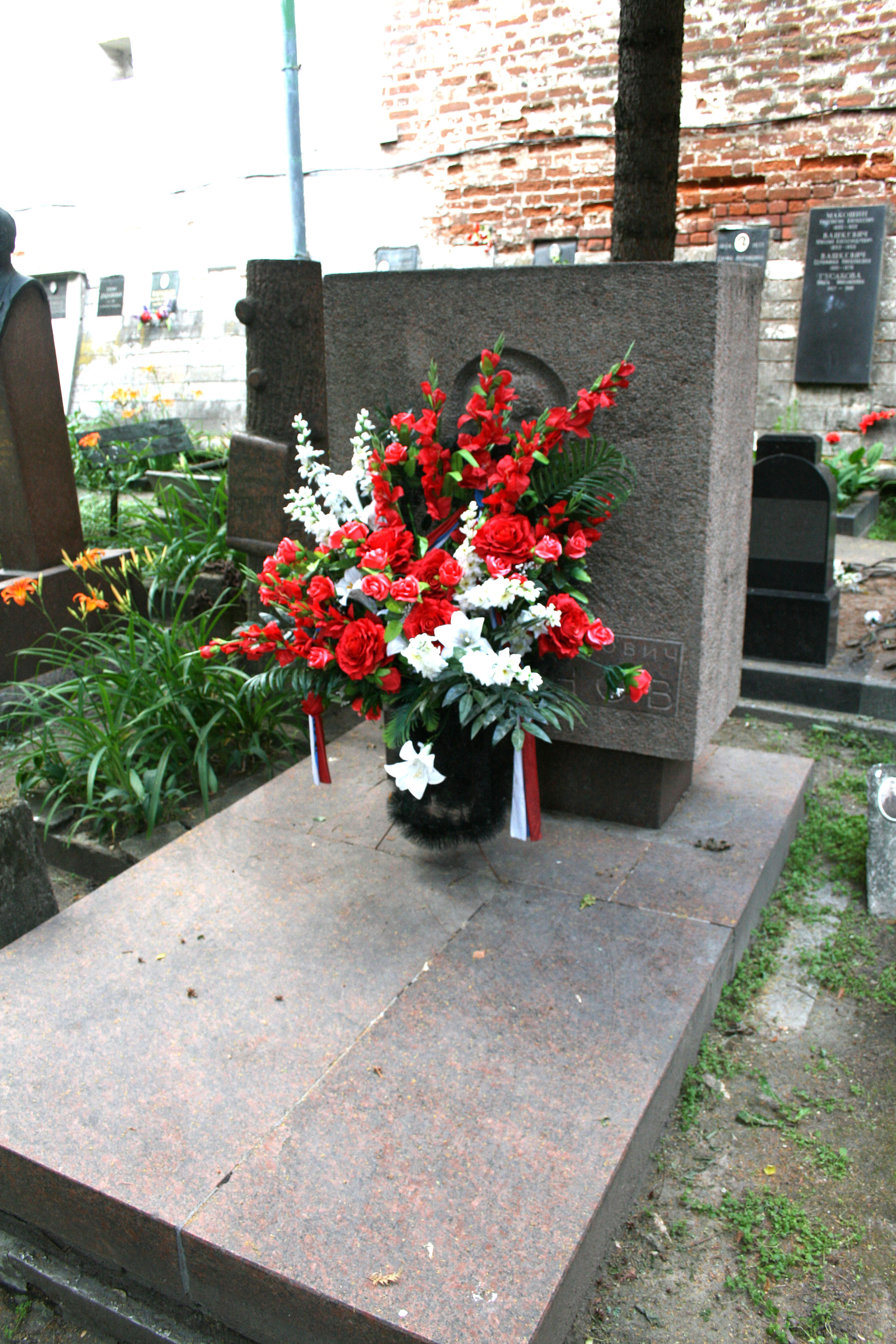
Grave of Litvinov at the Novodevichy Cemetery in Moscow

Litvinov died on 31 December 1951. After his death, rumours he was murdered on Stalin's instructions to the Ministry of Internal Affairs circulated. According to Anastas Mikoyan, a lorry deliberately collided with Litvinov's car as it rounded a bend near the Litvinov dacha on 31 December 1951, and he later died of his injuries. British television journalist Tim Tzouliadis stated: "The assassination of Litvinov marked an intensification of Stalin's anti-Semitic campaign". According to Litvinov's wife and daughter, however, Stalin was still on good terms with Litvinov at the time of his death. They said he had serious heart problems and was given the best treatment available during the final weeks of his life, and that he died from a heart attack on 31 December 1951.

After Litvinov's death, his widow Ivy remained in the Soviet Union until she returned to live in Britain in 1972.

In his reminiscences dictated to a supporter later in life, Vyacheslav Molotov—Litvinov's replacement as chief of foreign affairs and right-hand man of Joseph Stalin—said Litvinov was "intelligent" and "first rate" but said Stalin and he "didn't trust him," having consequently "left him out of negotiations" with the United States during the war. Molotov called Litvinov "not a bad diplomat—a good one" but also called him "quite an opportunist" who "greatly sympathized with [Leon] Trotsky, [Grigory] Zinoviev, and [Lev] Kamenev". According to Molotov, "Litvinov remained among the living [in the Great Purge] only by chance".

Litvinov's grandson Pavel Litvinov, a physicist, writer and Soviet-era dissident, lives in the United States.

== See also ==
- Outline of the Russian Revolution and Civil War
- Bibliography of the Russian Revolution and Civil War
- Bibliography of Stalinism and the Soviet Union
- Index of Old Bolsheviks
- Index of articles related to the Russian Revolution and Civil War
- Foreign relations of the Soviet Union
- Soviet–German relations before 1941

== Sources ==
- Holroyd-Doveton, John (2013). Maxim Litvinov: A Biography. Woodland Publications. ISBN 978-0957296107.
- Nekrich, Alexander; Ulam, Adam; Freeze, Gregory L., eds. (1997). Pariahs, Partners, Predators: German-Soviet Relations, 1922–1941. New York: Columbia University Press. ISBN 0231106769.
- Rappaport, Helen (2010). Conspirator: Lenin in Exile, The Making of a Revolutionary. Windmill Books. ISBN 978-0465013951.
- Resis, Albert (2000). "The Fall of Litvinov: Harbinger of the German-Soviet Non-Aggression Pact". Europe-Asia Studies. 52 (1): 33–56. doi:10.1080/09668130098253. JSTOR 153750. S2CID 153557275.

== Works ==
- The Bolshevik Revolution: Its Rise and Meaning. London: British Socialist Party, n.d. (1919).

== See also ==
- Bibliography of the Russian Revolution and Civil War
- Outline of the Russian Revolution and Civil War
- Index of articles related to the Russian Revolution and Civil War

Political offices
Preceded by Georgy Chicherin	People's Commissar for Foreign Affairs; 1930–1939	Succeeded by Vyacheslav Molotov
