= Moss Dagblad =

Local newspaper in Moss, Norway

- Type: Three days a week
- Format: Tabloid (1980–present)
- Owner: Amedia
- Editor: Morten Øby
- Founded: 1912
- Political alignment: Labour Party; Non-partisan
- Headquarters: Moss, Norway
- Circulation: 5,648
- Website: www.moss-dagblad.no

Moss Dagblad is a local newspaper in Moss, Norway that was reestablished in 2014 as a zoned publication of the daily Dagsavisen.

At one time it was second largest in the city behind Moss Avis, it was published three days a week where the chief editor was Morten Øby.

The paper was established in 1912 as Moss Socialdemokrat, being affiliated with the Labour Party. It changed its name to Folkets Blad in 1923. In 1927 it absorbed the Social Democratic Moss Arbeiderblad, and continued under the name Moss og Omegn Arbeiderblad. In 1957 it absorbed the Ski-based Labour newspaper Follo, and from 1960 it continued under the name Moss Dagblad. It later became an independent paper.

It changed to tabloid format in 1980 and launched a Sunday newspaper in 1998, but the Sunday edition lasted only for one year. In 2001 the number of issues per week was cut from six to three.

In addition to Moss, the newspaper covered Våler and Vestby. In 1983 it had a circulation of only 2,917, which increased to 6,937 in 2004. In 2008 it had a circulation of 5,648, of whom 5,551 were subscribers. Moss Avis was published by Moss Dagblad AS, which was owned 100% by A-pressen.
