= Litvinov Protocol =

1929 international peace treaty

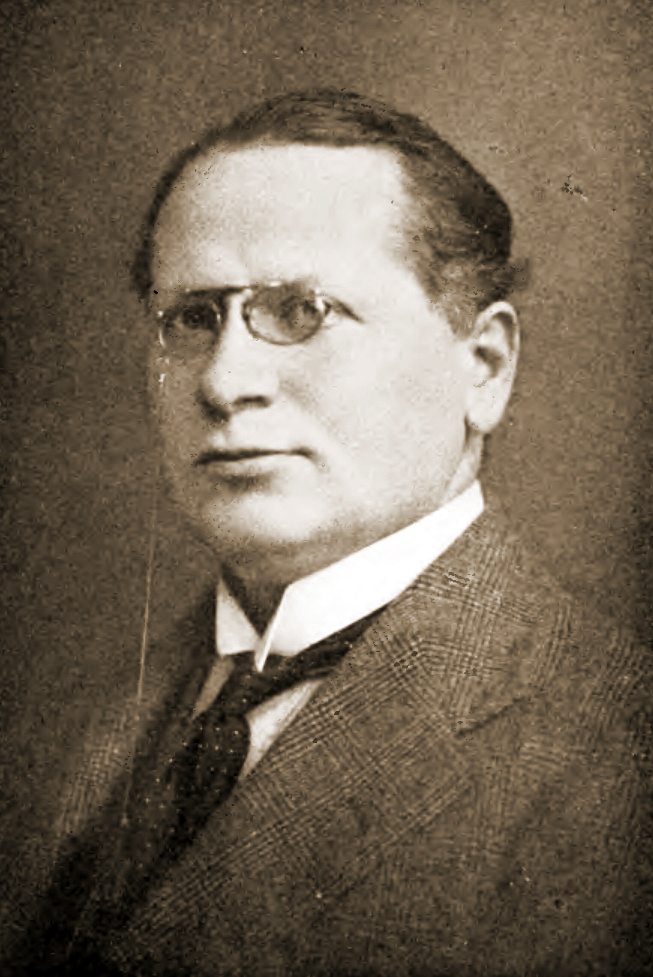
Soviet diplomat Maxim Litvinov (1876–1951), namesake of the Litvinov Protocol.

The Litvinov Protocol is the common name of an international peace treaty concluded in Moscow on February 9, 1929. Named after the chief Soviet diplomat moving the negotiations forward, Maxim Litvinov, the treaty provided for immediate implementation of the Kellogg-Briand Pact by its signatories, thereby formally renouncing war as a part of national foreign policy.

The formal name of the Litvinov Protocol as registered with the League of Nations was the "Protocol for the Immediate Entry into Force of the Treaty of Paris of August 27, 1928, Regarding Renunciation of War as an Instrument of National Policy." The treaty is also sometimes known as the "Moscow Protocol."

Initial signatories of the Litvinov Protocol included the Union of Soviet Socialist Republics (Soviet Union), Poland, Latvia, Estonia, and Romania. Four other countries later formally adhered to the protocol: Lithuania, Finland, Turkey, and Persia.

== Background ==
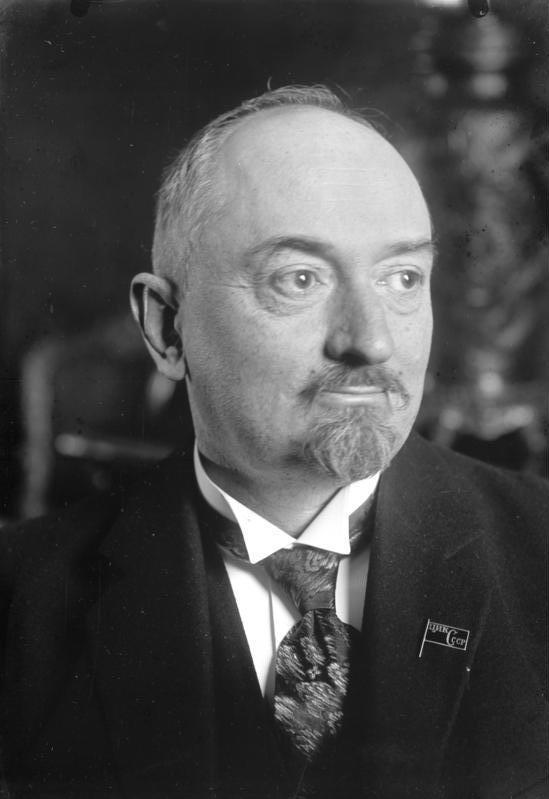
Soviet People's Commissar of Foreign Affairs Georgy Chicherin (1872–1936) was a vocal critic of the Kellogg–Briand Pact and sought to hold the Soviet Union aloof from the treaty, which he perceived as a toothless propaganda document that masked an aggressive hidden agenda.

Near the end of 1927 correspondence between the foreign diplomatic corps of France and the United States began motion towards an international treaty in which signatories would renounce the use of war as an instrument of political policy. Negotiations proceeded apace during the first half of 1928 with the foreign departments of 15 governments ultimately taking part in the process. Final language was fairly rapidly agreed upon and on August 27, 1928, there took place a formal signing of what became known as the Kellogg–Briand Pact (named after American Secretary of State Frank B. Kellogg and French Foreign Minister Aristide Briand) in Paris.

The communist government of the Soviet Union was divided over the 1928 Kellogg–Briand Pact during the negotiation process, kept at arm's length by the capitalist powers behind the treaty and viewing the earnestness and intentions of these great powers with a large measure of cynicism. Ever fearful of foreign invasion, the Soviet government sought as its goal total military disarmament, arguing that continued existence of armaments on a massive scale were fundamentally incompatible with a formalistic call for a ban on war. An article in the Soviet government newspaper Izvestiya singled out Secretary of State Kellogg in particular, noting his continued public support of the Monroe Doctrine and its prescription for military action by the United States against "any power in the world" which infringed upon it.

Soviet People's Commissar of Foreign Affairs Georgy Chicherin was also sharply critical of the decision to keep the USSR from taking an active part in treaty negotiations as well as formal reservations to the treaty expressed by the governments of Great Britain and France.

While it deeply suspected the political intentions behind the Kellogg–Briand Pact, at the same time the Soviet government sought to both score political points in the court of public opinion and to establish at least some modicum of diplomatic security by endorsing the proposed treaty's ban on the use of war as an instrument of policy. By the summer of 1928 it had become clear to foreign policy observers that the Soviet Union was actively seeking a place at the negotiating table that led to creation and signature of the Paris Treaty, with Chicherin, an opponent of making the USSR a party to the multilateral treaty, having lost the policy debate to Deputy People's Commissar of Foreign Affairs and veteran Soviet diplomat Maxim Litvinov, a treaty supporter.

Although the USSR was excluded from the honor of being a founding signatory of the Kellogg–Briand Pact on August 27, on the same day of the treaty's signing an official invitation to accede to the pact was presented to the governments of all other countries of the world and the Soviet government was quick to add its name to the list of signatories. On August 29 the governing Presidium of the Central Executive Committee of Soviets (TsIK), the nominal head of government, passed a formal resolution to accept the treaty — a result which Litvinov related to peace commission functionaries the following day. An act of formal accession to the Paris treaty was ratified on September 8, 1928.

In an official Izvestiya editorial dated September 7, 1928, the Soviet government deemed its acceptance of the Paris pact had been made "in order to point out the insufficiency of the proposed obligations, and to demand the broadening of these obligations so as truly to safeguard peace" — something which could be achieved only through "positive and fruitful work on disarmament." Such desires were rapidly frustrated as the ratification process by diverse signatories bogged down. Four months after the treaty was signed, not one of the signatories had formally ratified it.

== Conception ==
Once it had decided to add itself to the signatories of the Paris antiwar accord, the government of the Soviet Union, whether for propaganda or practical purposes, became the Kellogg–Briand Pact's leading supporter, attempting to bring it into force with neighboring countries. On December 29, 1928, Litvinov proposed an additional protocol to the Paris treaty bringing it into immediate effect in the USSR's bilateral relations with historic enemy Poland and newly independent former part of the Russian Empire Lithuania.

Poland was first to respond to this Soviet initiative, putting forward a counterproposal to include its military ally, Romania, as part of the supplemental protocol, as well as the other Baltic states. The Soviet government agreed to this Polish proposition to expand the circle of regional nations accelerating adoption of the Paris Treaty and the circle of communications was expended to include as well as the USSR, Poland, and Lithuania also Romania, Latvia, Estonia, Finland, Persia, and Turkey.

The document accelerating acceptance of the Kellogg–Briand principles became commonly known as the "Litvinov Protocol" or the "Moscow Protocol." The formal name of the document, as registered with the League of Nations, was the "Protocol for the Immediate Entry into Force of the Treaty of Paris of August 27, 1928, Regarding Renunciation of War as an Instrument of National Policy."

== Signing ==
The treaty was ratified by the government of Latvia on March 5, 1929, by Estonia on March 16, 1929, and the governments of Poland and Romania on March 30, 1929. It was registered in League of Nations Treaty Series on June 3, 1929. According to article 3, it became operative on March 16, 1929.

== Effect and legacy ==
The Litvinov pact was an enrichment of the Kellogg-Briand pact to ensure that the USSR had sufficient time to recuperate and rebuild the Soviet state in the 1920s. During the 1930s, the pact began to deteriorate, as disputes by member states increased in frequency and severity. The Polish–Czechoslovak border conflicts severely damaged the pact in 1938, with the aid of Nazi Germany, Poland annexed portions of Czechoslovakia. Finally, the USSR fatally undermined the pact when it invaded Poland in 1939.
