= Fremad =

Norwegian-language weekly newspaper

Fremad ('Forward') was a Norwegian-language weekly newspaper published from Sioux Falls, South Dakota, United States, between 1894 and 1935. During its first two years of publishing, the socialist Olav Kringen edited the paper.
