= Boris Stomonyakov =

Soviet diplomat (1882–1940)

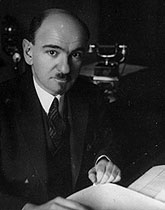
Boris Stomonyakov

Boris Spiridonovich Stomonyakov (Russian: Борис Спиридонович Стомоняков; 15 June 1882 – 16 October 1940) was a Russian Bolshevik of ethnic Bulgarian descent and anti-Tsarist revolutionary who later became a trade representative and diplomat for the Union of Soviet Socialist Republics during the decades of the 1920s and 1930s.

Regarded as a close assistant of Soviet People's Commissar of Foreign Affairs Maxim Litvinov, Stomonyakov was one of the top political figures in the Soviet foreign affairs bureaucracy, heading up the Soviet foreign ministry's diplomatic relations with Poland, Lithuania, Latvia, and Estonia from the middle 1920s. He was promoted to Deputy People's Commissar of Foreign Affairs in 1934.

Stomonyakov fell under suspicion during the latter days of the Great Purge of 1937-1938 and was arrested by the Soviet secret police in December 1938. After an extensive period of incarceration and interrogation, Stomonyakov was found guilty of being a member of a "counterrevolutionary Trotskyite organization" and spying for Germany and Poland and was sentenced to death. He was executed on October 16, 1940.

Stomonyakov was posthumously rehabilitated by the Soviet government for a wrongful conviction and execution in 1988.

== Biography ==
=== Early years ===
Boris Spiridonovich Stomonyakov was born 15 June 1882 O.S. in Odessa, Ukraine, then part of the Russian Empire. He joined the Russian Social Democratic Labour Party (RSDLP) in 1902, suffering arrest and deportation from the country two years later.

Stomonyakov continued his revolutionary activities on behalf of the Bolshevik wing of the RSDLP in exile until 1910, when he abruptly dropped out of the revolutionary movement.

He went to Bulgaria in 1915 and was inducted into the Bulgarian Army, fighting against Russia during World War I until 1917, when he was transferred to work in the Bulgarian embassy in the Netherlands.

After termination of hostilities in the World War, Stomonyakov returned to Germany, where he began to work for the new Bolshevik government of Soviet Russia. Stomonyakov was named the official trade representative of the Soviet government in Berlin in 1921, a position which he would retain until 1924.

=== Diplomatic career ===
In 1924 Stomonyakov relocated to the Soviet Union, taking up a post in the legal department of the People's Commissariat of Foreign Affairs (Narkomindel). His work attracted the notice of Deputy People's Commissar of Foreign Affairs Maxim Litvinov, and Stomonyakov was soon placed in charge of international relations between the USSR and Poland and the Baltic states of Lithuania, Latvia, and Estonia.

Stomonyakov was made a member of the governing Collegium of Narkomindel in 1926.

Stomonyakov was named Deputy People's Commissar for Foreign Affairs in 1934.

=== Arrest, execution, and legacy ===
Stomonyakov was arrested on 17 December 1938. He was found guilty by the Military Collegium of the Supreme Court of the USSR of participating in a counterrevolutionary Trotskyite organization which spied on behalf of Germany and Poland and sentenced to death.

Stomonyakov was executed on 16 October 1940. He was posthumously rehabilitated in 1988, during the period of perestroika and critical reexamination of the abuses and crimes of the Soviet past.
