= Kellogg–Briand Pact =

1928 international agreement

General Treaty for Renunciation of War as an Instrument of National Policy
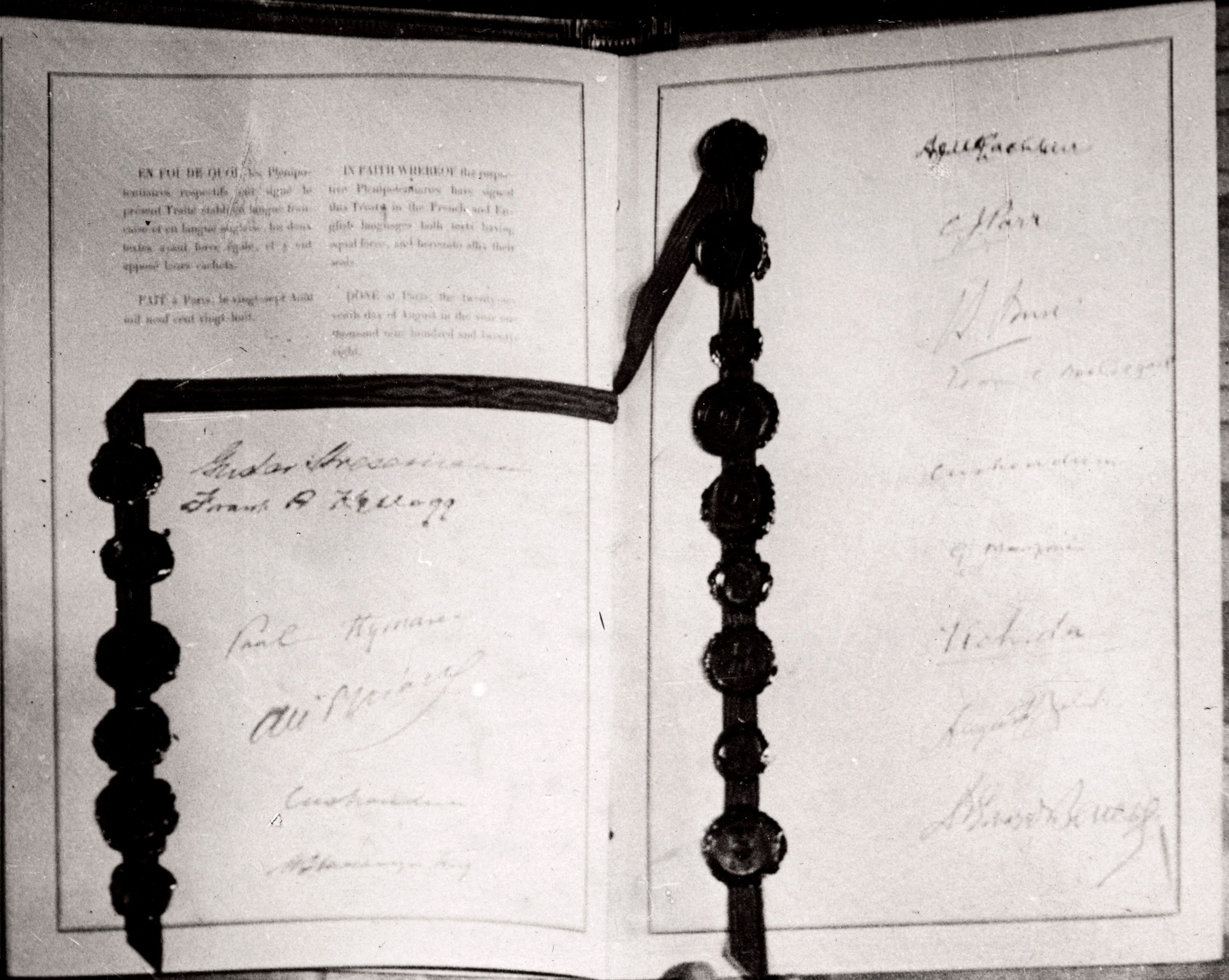
- Kellogg–Briand Pact with signatures
- Signed: 27 August 1928
- Location: Quai d'Orsay, Paris, France
- Effective: 24 July 1929
- Negotiators: Frank B. Kellogg, Secretary of State; Aristide Briand, Minister of Foreign Affairs
- Parties: Australia; Belgium; Canada; Czechoslovakia; France; Germany; India; Ireland; Italy; Japan; New Zealand; Poland; South Africa; United Kingdom; United States; 31 signatories by effective date: Afghanistan; Albania; Austria; Bulgaria; China; Cuba; Denmark; Dominican Republic; Egypt; Estonia; Ethiopian Empire; Finland; Guatemala; Hungary; Iceland; Latvia; Liberia; Lithuania; Netherlands; Nicaragua; Norway; Panama; Peru; Portugal; Romania; Kingdom of Serbs, Croats and Slovenes; Soviet Union; (Thailand) Siam; Spain; Sweden; Turkey; 25 countries once in force: Antigua and Barbuda (1988); Barbados (1971); Bosnia and Herzegovina (1994); Brazil; Chile; Costa Rica; Croatia (1994); Czech Republic (1993); Free City of Danzig; Dominica (1988); Dominican Republic; Ecuador; Fiji (1973); Greece; Haiti; Hejaz; Honduras; Iraq; Luxembourg; Mexico; Paraguay; Persia; Slovenia (1994); Switzerland; Venezuela

Full text
- Kellogg–Briand Treaty at Wikisource

The Kellogg–Briand Pact or Pact of Paris (officially the General Treaty for Renunciation of War as an Instrument of National Policy) is a 1928 international agreement on peace in which signatory states promised not to use war to resolve "disputes or conflicts of whatever nature or of whatever origin they may be, which may arise among them". The pact was signed by Germany, France, and the United States on 27 August 1928, and by most other states soon after. Sponsored by France and the US, the Pact is named after its authors, United States Secretary of State Frank B. Kellogg and French foreign minister Aristide Briand. The pact was concluded outside the League of Nations and remains in effect.

A common criticism is that the Kellogg–Briand Pact did not live up to all of its aims but has arguably had some success. It was unable to prevent the Second World War but was the basis for trials and execution of German wartime leaders in 1946. Furthermore, declared wars became very rare after 1945. It has been ridiculed for its moralism, legalism, and lack of influence on foreign policy. The pact had no mechanism for enforcement, and many historians and political scientists see it as mostly irrelevant and ineffective. Nevertheless, the pact served as the legal basis for the concept of a crime against peace, for which the Nuremberg Tribunal and Tokyo Tribunal tried and executed the top leaders condemned for starting World War II.

Similar provisions to those in the Kellogg–Briand Pact were later incorporated into the Charter of the United Nations and other treaties, which gave rise to a more activist American foreign policy which began with the signing of the pact.

== Text ==
The main text is very short:

Article I

The High Contracting Parties solemnly declare in the names of their respective peoples that they condemn recourse to war for the solution of international controversies and renounce it as an instrument of national policy in their relations with one another.

Article II

The High Contracting Parties agree that the settlement or solution of all disputes or conflicts of whatever nature or of whatever origin they may be, which may arise among them, shall never be sought except by pacific means.

== Parties ==
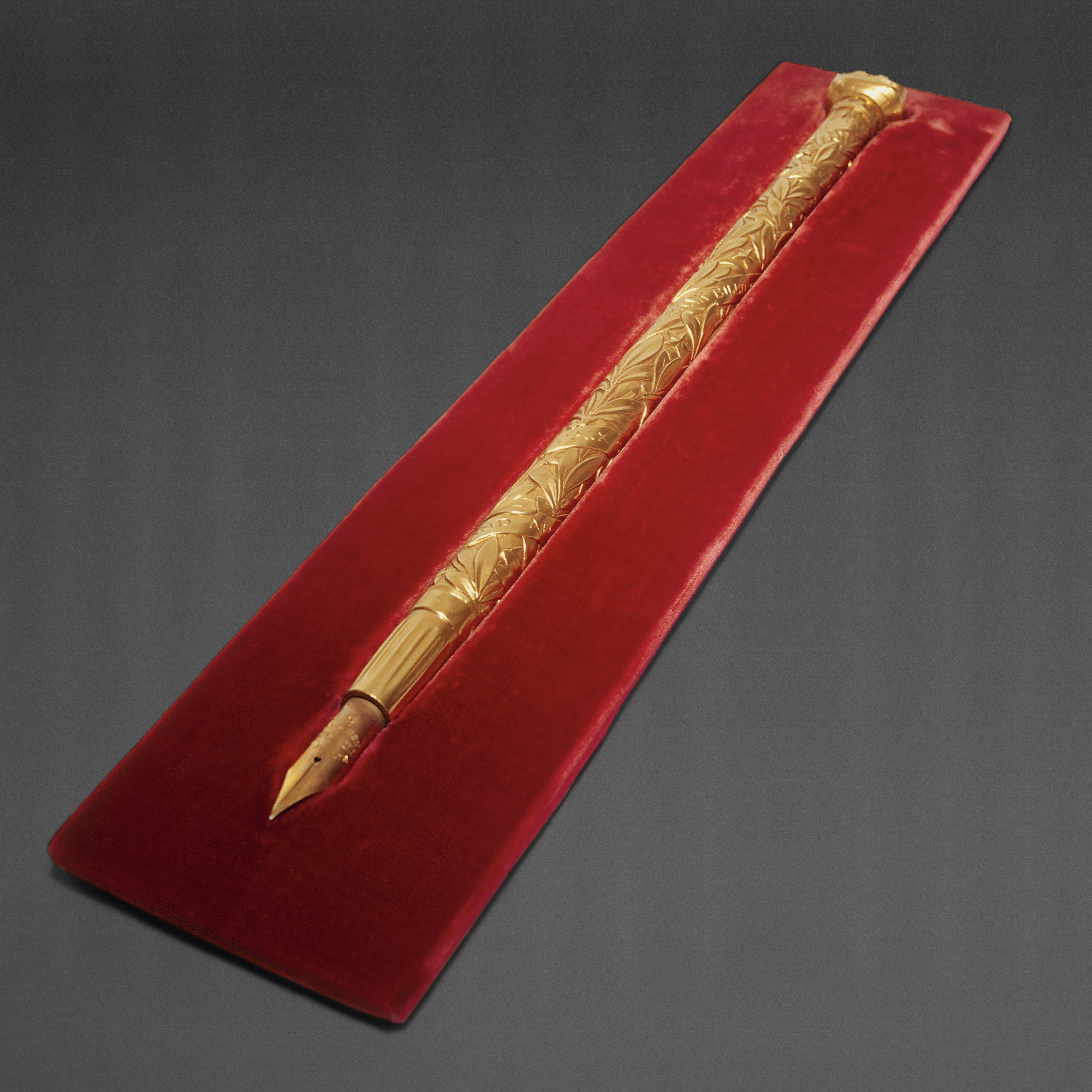
Gold fountain pen used by Secretary Kellogg and his 14 foreign counterparts to sign the Kellog-Briand Pact in France in August 1928

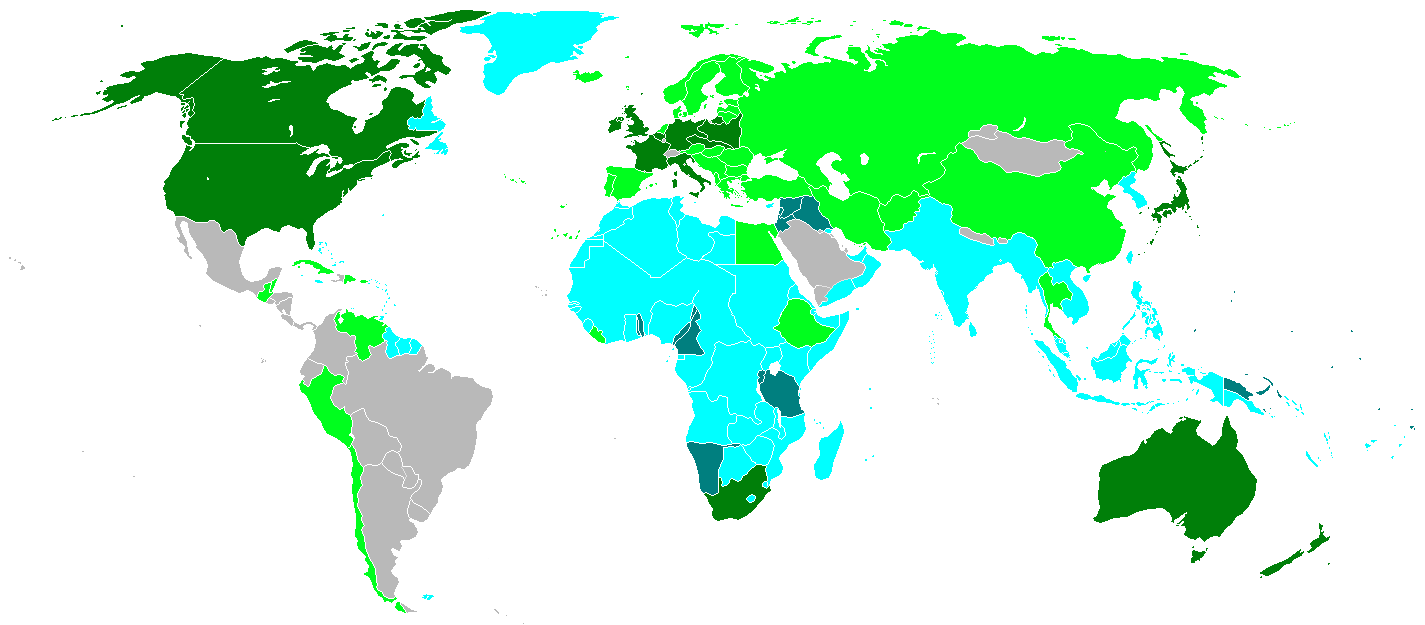
Original signatories Subsequent adherents Territories of parties League of Nations mandates administered by parties

The plan was devised by American lawyers Salmon Levinson and James T. Shotwell, and promoted by Senator William E. Borah.

Borah and U.S. diplomat William Richards Castle Jr., Assistant Secretary of State, played key roles after Kellogg and Briand agreed on a two party treaty between the U.S. and France. It was originally intended as a bilateral treaty, but Castle worked to expand it to a multinational agreement that included practically the entire world. Castle managed to overcome French objections through his discussions with the French ambassador, replacing the narrow Franco-American agreement with a treaty that attracted almost all major and minor nations.

The pact was first signed on 27 August 1928 in Paris at the French Foreign Ministry by the representatives from Australia, Belgium, Canada, Czechoslovakia, France, Germany, the United Kingdom, India, the Irish Free State, Italy, Japan, New Zealand, Poland, South Africa, and the United States. It took effect on 24 July 1929.

By that date, the following nations had deposited instruments of ratification of the pact:

- Afghanistan
- Albania
- Austria
- Bulgaria
- China
- Cuba
- Denmark
- Egypt
- Estonia
- Ethiopia
- Finland
- Guatemala
- Hungary
- Iceland
- Latvia
- Liberia
- Lithuania
- Netherlands
- Nicaragua
- Norway
- Panama
- Peru
- Portugal
- Romania
- Kingdom of the Serbs, Croats, and Slovenes (later Kingdom of Yugoslavia)
- Siam
- Soviet Union
- Spain
- Sweden
- Turkey

12 additional parties joined after that date: Persia, Greece, Honduras, Chile, Luxembourg, Danzig, Costa Rica, Mexico, Venezuela, Paraguay, Switzerland and the Dominican Republic for a total of 57 state parties by 1929. Six states joined between 1930 and 1934: Haiti, Colombia, Saudi Arabia, Ecuador, Iraq and Brazil. After the Second World War, Barbados declared its accession to the treaty in 1971, followed by Fiji (1973), Antigua and Barbuda, Dominica (both 1988), the Czech Republic and Slovakia (after Czechoslovakia dissolved in 1993), and, as a result of the dissolution of Yugoslavia, Slovenia (1992), Bosnia and Herzegovina and Croatia (both in 1994). The Free City of Danzig, which had joined the Pact in 1929, ceased to exist in 1939 and became a regular part of Poland after World War II.

In the United States, the Senate approved the treaty 85–1, with only Wisconsin Republican John J. Blaine voting against over concerns with British imperialism. While the U.S. Senate did not add any reservations to the treaty, it did pass a measure which interpreted the treaty as not infringing upon the United States' right of self-defense and not obliging the nation to enforce it by taking action against those who violated it.

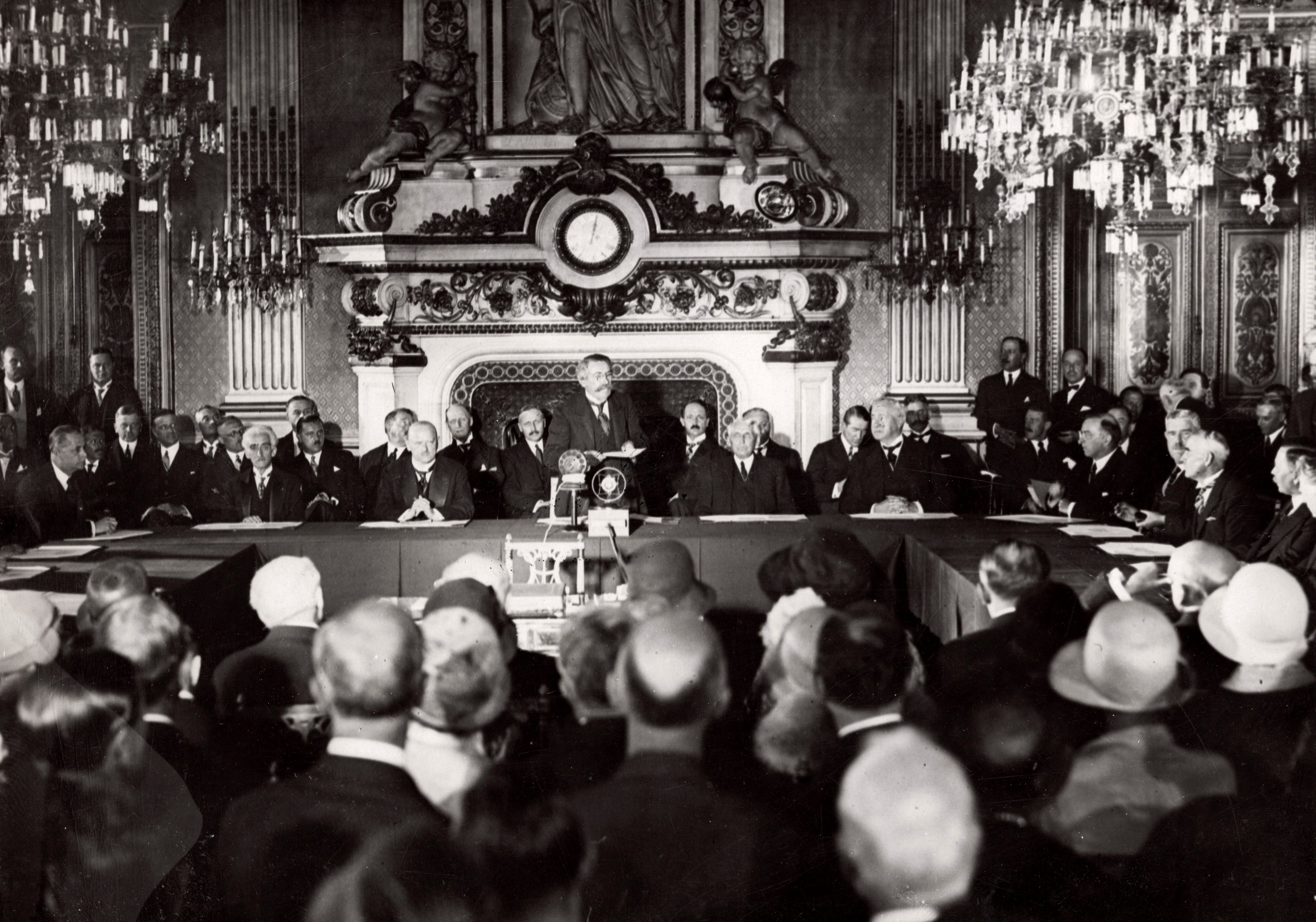
French Foreign Minister Aristide Briand speaking

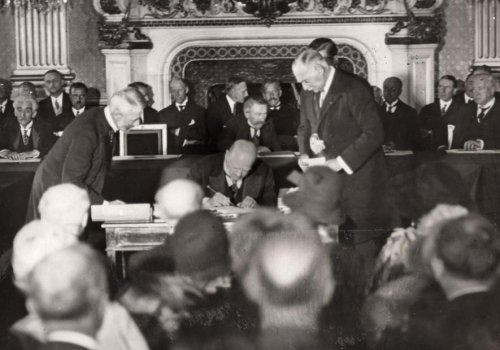
German Foreign Minister Gustav Stresemann signing

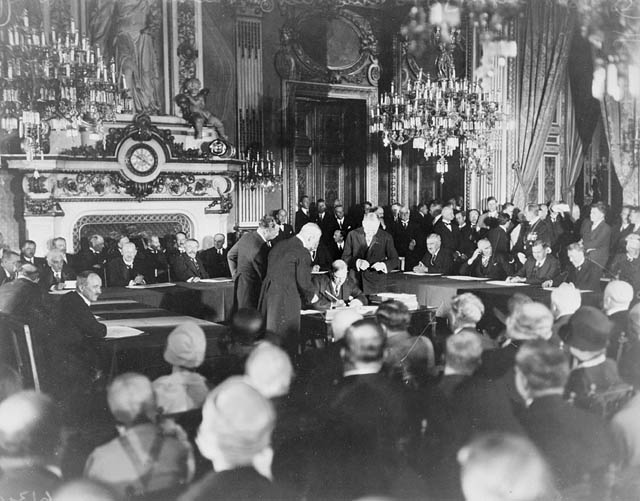
Canadian Secretary of State for External Affairs William Mackenzie King signing

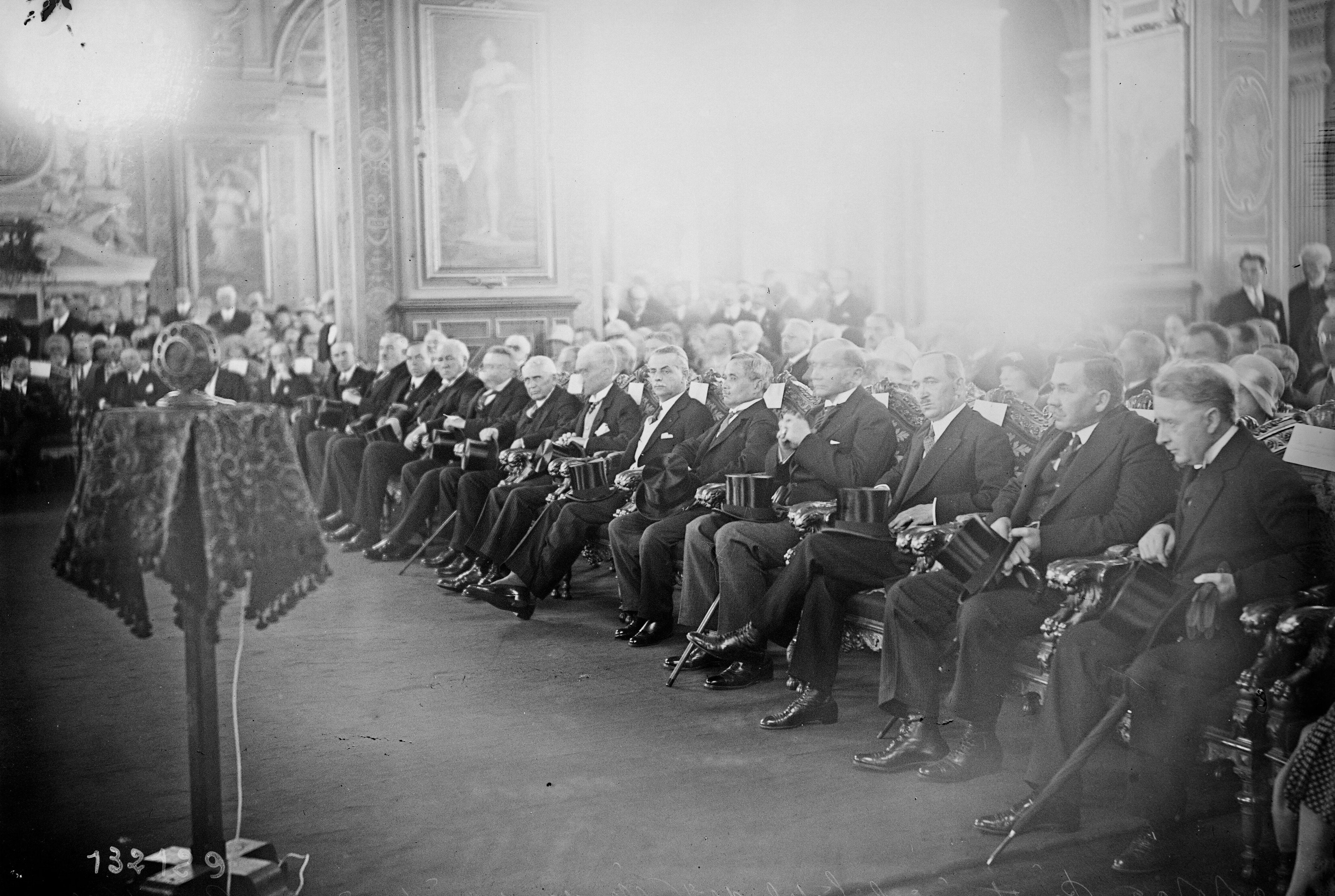
Signatories attend a reception at Paris City Hall

== Effect and legacy ==
The 1928 Kellogg–Briand Pact was concluded outside the League of Nations and remains in effect. One month following its conclusion, a similar agreement, the General Act for the Pacific Settlement of International Disputes, was concluded in Geneva, which obliged its signatory parties to establish conciliation commissions in any case of dispute. With the signing of the Litvinov Protocol in Moscow on February 9, 1929, the Soviet Union and its western neighbors, including Romania, agreed to put the Kellogg–Briand Pact in effect without waiting for other western signatories to ratify. The Bessarabian question had made agreement between Romania and the Soviet Union challenging and dispute between the nations over Bessarabia continued. The pact's central provisions renouncing the use of war, and promoting peaceful settlement of disputes and the use of collective force to prevent aggression, were incorporated into the United Nations Charter and other treaties. Although civil wars continued, wars between established states have been rare since 1945, with a few major exceptions such as the Indo-Pakistani War of 1971 and various conflicts in the Middle East.

As a practical matter, the Kellogg–Briand Pact did not live up to its primary aims, but has arguably had some success. It did not end war or stop the rise of militarism, and was unable to keep the international peace in succeeding years. Its legacy remains as a statement of the idealism expressed by advocates for peace in the interwar period. However, it also helped to erase the legal distinction between war and peace, because the signatories, having renounced the use of war, began to wage wars without declaring them, as in the Japanese invasion of Manchuria in 1931, the Italian invasion of Abyssinia in 1935, the Soviet invasion of Finland in 1939, and the German and Soviet invasions of Poland.

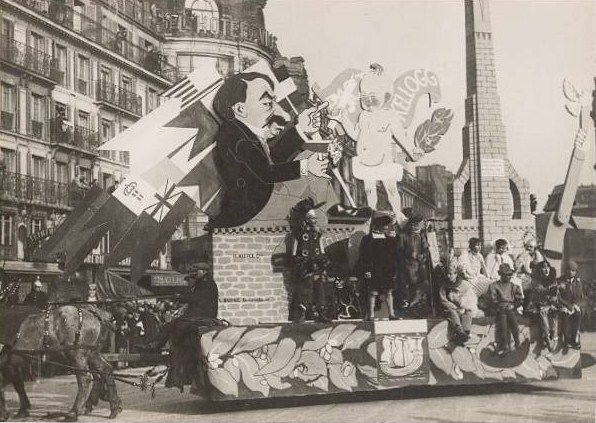
Mockery of the Pact during the Paris Carnival in 1929

The popular perception of the Kellogg–Briand Pact was best summarized by Eric Sevareid who, in a nationally televised series on American diplomacy between the two world wars, referred to the pact as a "worthless piece of paper". In his history of Europe from 1914 to 1948, historian Ian Kershaw referred to the Pact as "vacuous" and said that it was "a dead letter from the moment it was signed."

While the Pact has been ridiculed for its moralism and legalism and lack of influence on foreign policy, it did lead to a more activist American foreign policy. Legal scholars Scott J. Shapiro and Oona A. Hathaway have argued that the Pact inaugurated "a new era of human history" characterized by the decline of inter-state war as a structuring dynamic of the international system. According to Shapiro and Hathaway one reason for the historical insignificance of the pact was the absence of an enforcement mechanism to compel compliance from signatories, since the pact only calls for violators to "be denied of the benefits furnished by [the] treaty". They also said that the Pact appealed to the West because it promised to secure and protect previous conquests, thus securing their place at the head of the international legal order indefinitely. They wrote in 2017:

As its effects reverberated across the globe, it reshaped the world map, catalyzed the human rights revolution, enabled the use of economic sanctions as a tool of law enforcement, and ignited the explosion in the number of international organizations that regulate so many aspects of our daily lives.

Hathaway and Shapiro show that between 1816 and 1928 there was on average one military conquest every ten months. After 1945, in very sharp contrast, the number of such conflicts declined to one in every four years.

The pact, in addition to binding the particular nations that signed it, has also served as one of the legal bases establishing the international norms that the threat or use of military force in contravention of international law, as well as the territorial acquisitions resulting from it, are unlawful. The interdiction of aggressive war was confirmed and broadened by the United Nations Charter, which provides in article 2, paragraph 4, that "All Members shall refrain in their international relations from the threat or use of force against the territorial integrity or political independence of any state, or in any other manner inconsistent with the Purposes of the United Nations." One legal consequence is that it is unlawful to annex territory by force, although other forms of annexation have not been prevented. More broadly, there is now a strong presumption against the legality of using, or threatening, military force against another country. Nations that have resorted to the use of force since the Charter came into effect have typically invoked self-defense or the right of collective defense.

Notably, the pact also served as the legal basis for the concept of a crime against peace. It was for committing this crime that the Nuremberg Tribunal and Tokyo Tribunal tried and executed the top leaders responsible for starting World War II.

Political scientists Julie Bunck and Michael Fowler in 2018 argued that the Pact was:

an important early venture in multilateralism. ... [I]nternational law evolved to circumscribe the use of armed force with legal restrictions. The forcible acquisition of territory by conquest became illegitimate and individual criminal liability might attach to those who pursued it. In criminalizing war, the Kellogg–Briand played a role in the development of a new norm of behavior in international relations, a norm that continues to play a role in our current international order.

== See also ==
- Geneva Protocol (1924)
- Anti-Comintern Pact
- Four-Power Pact
- Pact of Steel
- Tripartite Pact
- Washington Naval Treaty
