= Pereverzev =

Pereverzev (Russian: Переверзев) is a Russian masculine surname, its feminine counterpart is Pereverzeva. It may refer to

- Eduard Pereverzev (born 1953), Soviet hurdler
- Ivan Pereverzev (1914–1978), Soviet actor
- Natalia Pereverzeva (born 1988), Russian model
- Nikolai Pereverzev (born 1986), Russian futsal player
- Valerian Fedorovich Pereverzev (1882–1968), Soviet literary scholar
- Viktor Pereverzev (born 1958), Azerbaijani former rower
