= Wickman =

Wickman is a surname. Notable people with the surname include:

- Bob Wickman (born 1969), American professional baseball player
- Ivar Wickman (1872–1914), Swedish physician who discovered the epidemic and contagious nature of polio
- Lance B. Wickman (born 1940), American Mormon; general authority and general counsel of the LDS church
- Linnéa Wickman (born 1992), Swedish politician
- Percy Wickman (1941–2004), Canadian politician from Alberta; MLA for Edmonton Rutherford
- Putte Wickman (1924–2006), Swedish clarinetist
