= Eivind Saxlund =

Norwegian lawyer and writer

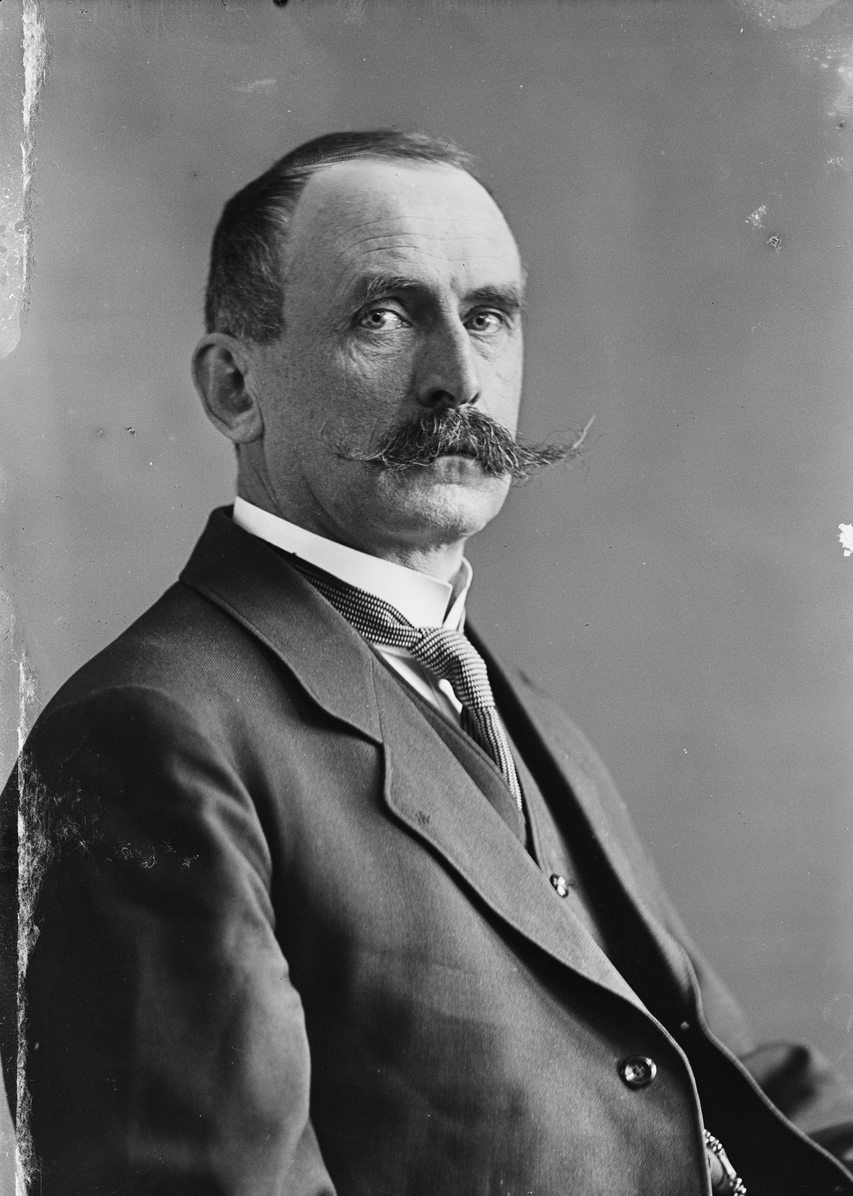
- Saxlund in 1911
- Born: 1858
- Died: 18 December 1936 (aged 77–78)
- Occupations: lawyer, writer
- Known for: contributions to antisemitic literature
- Notable work: 'Jøder og Gojim ("Jews and Goyim"), Nationalt Tidsskrift magazine, 'Wurzellose Rasse. ("Rootless Race")
- Spouse: Anna Magdalene Sundt
- Children: Alf Eivind Saxlund

Eivind Saxlund (1858 – 10 December 1936) was a Norwegian lawyer and writer. He was a barrister by occupation, and worked cases brought before the Supreme Court of Norway. However, he is better known for his contributions to anti-Semitic literature. He published the pamphlet Theodor Fritsch Jøder og Gojim ("Jews and Goyim") in 1910, translated it and wrote a preface, this work was featured in Det 20de Århundre, with new editions published in 1911, 1922 and 1923. He also contributed to Mikal Sylten's antisemitic magazine Nationalt Tidsskrift, both financially and with articles.

Together with Anna Magdalene Sundt (1863–1950), Eivind Saxlund had a son, Alf Eivind Saxlund, who also became a barrister.

Saxlund died in late 1936, before Norway became occupied by Nazi German (1940–1945).

== Author ==
- Wurzellose Rasse. (in German; i. e. "Rootless Race" sc. the Jews) in the anthology Die Weltfront. Eine Sammlung von Aufsätzen antisemitischer Führer aller Völker. (i. e. "The worldwide front. A collection of essays written by antisemitic leaders from all the people of the world.") Ed. Hans Krebs. Weltfrontverlag, Aussig 1926, p. 43-47 online
