= Garske =

Garske is a surname. Notable people with the surname include:

- Charlotte Garske (1906–1943), German political activist
- Erich Garske (1907–1943), German political activist

== See also ==
- Garske, North Dakota, is an unincorporated community in Ramsey County, in the U.S. state of North Dakota
