= Karl Moor =

Swiss communist

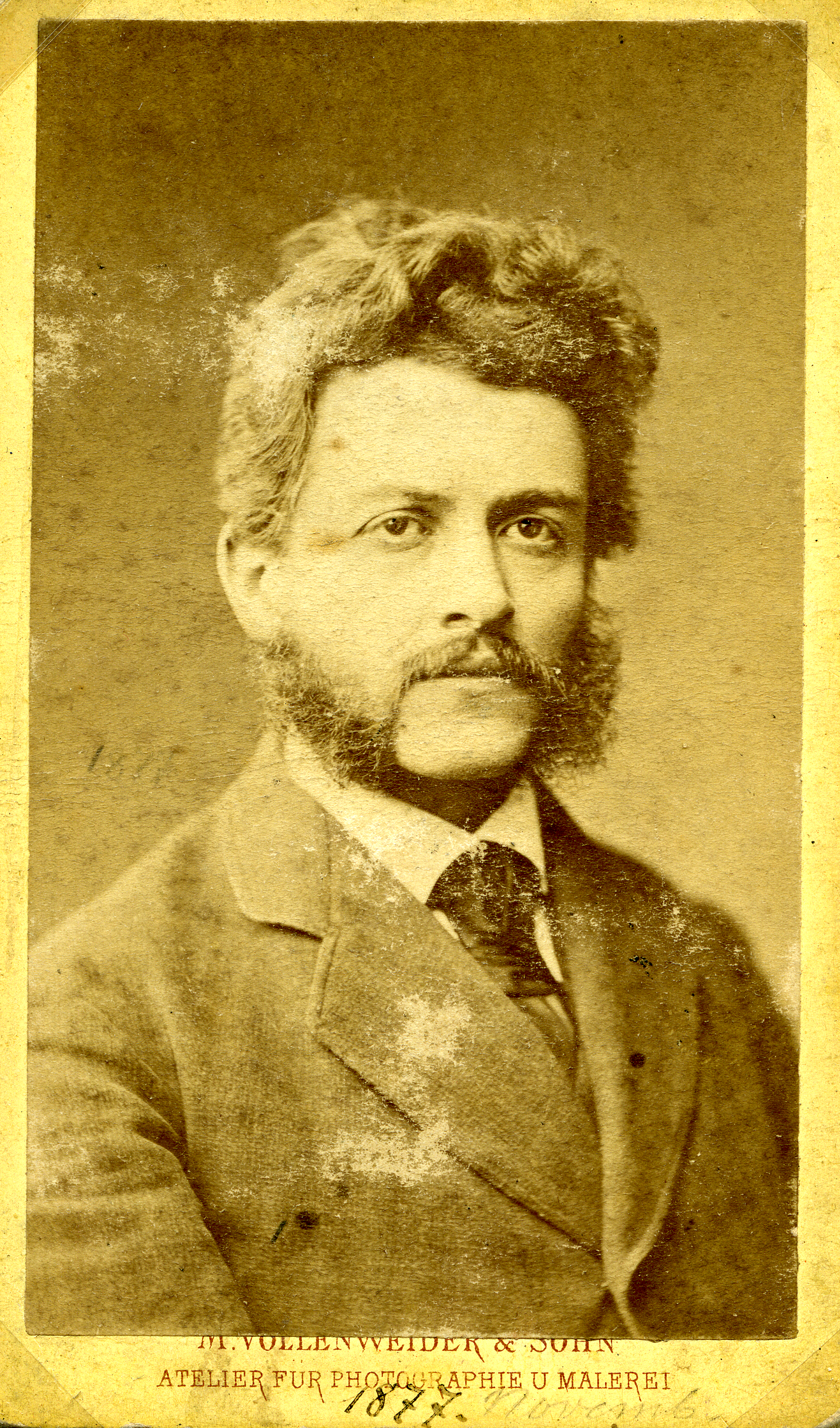
Karl Moor (1877)

Karl Vital Moor (11 December 1852 – 14 June 1932) was a Swiss communist, and a channel for German financing of the 19th-century European Bolshevik movement.

Born in Fribourg, he was the illegitimate son of Swiss citizen Mary Moor of Vordemwald and the Swiss aristocrat Ernest de Stoeklin of Fribourg. Moor studied at universities in both Switzerland and Germany. In the 1870's, his passion for the ideas of socialism led him to take part in the banned Social Democratic Party of Germany. In the spring of 1881, he was expelled from Bavaria and then moved to Basel. There, he became one of the more prominent functionaries of Swiss social democracy. In 1889, he lived in Bern, where he edited the social-democratic newspaper Berner Tagwacht. During this period, he provided assistance to political exiles from Russia, as well as the leaders of the Peoples' First Polish Socialist Party, "Proletariat," and the Bolsheviks-Lenintsev.

On May 4, 1917, Moor received a report from the German Ministry of Foreign Affairs detailing his interactions with various representatives of pacifist groups within Russia, including socialists. These representatives expressed a strong desire for a systematic, intensive, and effective campaign advocating for peace, to be led by a well-known neutral figure. They indicated a willingness to accept financial support for such efforts. Moor communicated Germany's readiness to provide substantial funding for these noble, humane, and international goals.

He further suggested the following principles: The sponsor would guarantee that money would come from an unsuspected source, and that the sponsor or the mediator would be provided with entry into Russia with the money, and to implement an immediate allocation of funds in the form of cash, and the most appropriate form of cash would be the Swiss franc

As a result, in July 1917 Moor was in Russia and supplied the Bolsheviks a loan in the amount of 32,837 dollars, allegedly from the inheritance.

In 1922, Moor with great difficulty made a partial return loan.

On 14 June 1932, Moor died in Berlin.

It was clarified that he was a German spy after World War I. His code name was "Bayer".

== Sources ==
- Haas L. Carl Vital Moor. 1852–1932. Ein Leben für Marx und Lenin. Zürish, 1970.
- Schurer H. Karl Moor – German Agent and Friend of Lenin // The Journal of Contemporary History. 1970. Vol. 5. 2.
- Dmitri Volkogonov. Lenin: A New Biography, Free Press, 1994 ISBN 978-0-02-933435-5
