= Alf Eivind Saxlund =

Norwegian military officer and barrister

Alf Eivind Saxlund (25 April 1890 – 17 January 1973) was a Norwegian military officer and barrister.

He was born in Kristiania as a son of barrister Eivind Saxlund (1858–1936) and Anna Magdalene Sundt (1863–1950). He finished secondary education in 1908 and graduated from officer school in 1910. He entered law studies and graduated from the Royal Frederick University with the cand.jur. degree in 1914, and after being a deputy judge in Orkdal District Court from 1914 to 1916 he studied at the University of Wisconsin from 1916 to 1917. Back in Norway he was a junior solicitor from 1917 to 1922 before starting his own law firm in 1923. He was based out of Oslo. Since 1921 he was a barrister with the access to work with Supreme Court cases. Also in 1921, he married Aalov Ingeborg Dorff.

He continued a military career on the side, and reached the rank of captain in 1930. From 1932 to 1945 he chaired the nationwide Conscript Officers' Association. He was also chairman of the company Oslo Staniol & Metalkapselfabrik. He died in January 1973.
