= Olav Kringen =

Norwegian newspaper editor

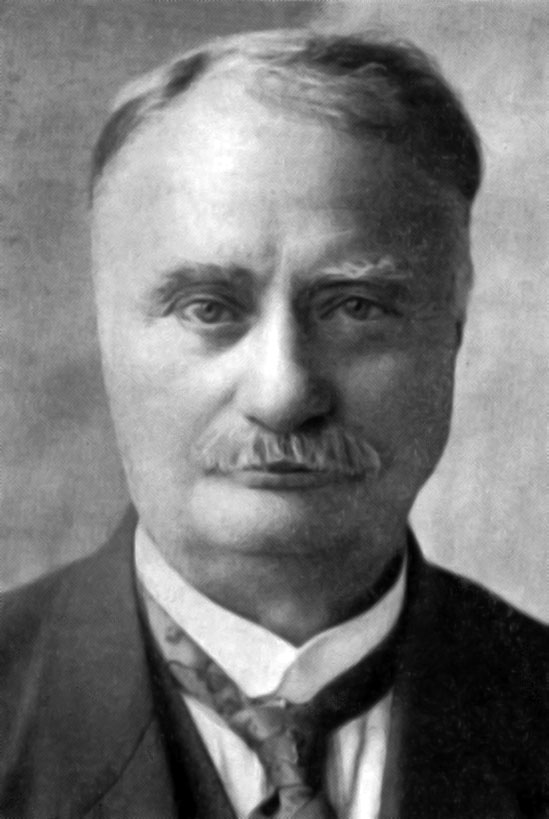

Olav Kringen (24 July 1867 – 6 October 1951) was a Norwegian newspaper editor.

He was born at a croft in Sel Municipality, Norway. He was a manual laborer in Norway before emigrating to the United States in 1887. There, he studied and took a teacher education. He worked as a teacher in Minnesota and Dakota. For the next two years he worked in the press, editing the magazine Nye Nordmanden and Fremad. He was also a correspondent for the newspaper Labour Leader, having been influenced by Keir Hardie and socialism in general.

Upon his return to Norway in 1897, he became affiliated with the Labour Party, and was hired in their newspaper Social-Demokraten. He was involved in the Second International from 1900 to 1906, being a delegate at the International Socialist Congress, Paris 1900 and the International Socialist Congress, Amsterdam 1904. He is well known for translating "The Internationale" and the Communist Manifesto into Norwegian.

He continued writing for Labour Leader, in addition to Sozialistische Monathefte, Avanti and Decorah-Posten. From 1901 to 1903 he edited Det 20de Aarhundre, a Labour partisan periodical. He then edited Social-Demokraten from 1903 to 1906. He was also a member of Kristiania city council from 1904 to 1907. Because of disagreements in the party, in 1906 he reverted to being a journalist in Social-Demokraten. He briefly edited Smaalenenes Socialdemokrat before establishing the newspaper Demokraten in Hamar in 1909. In Demokraten kringen had a certain personal drive, as he stood on the ballot in the 1909 Norwegian parliamentary election in the constituency Søndre Hedemarken. When he failed at being elected, he is said to have lost interest to a certain degree. He backed out in early 1912.

In 1921 the Labour Party was split in two, as a social democratic wing did not favor the party's recent adoption of the Conditions of Admission to the Communist International. Kringen joined the newly formed party, the Social Democratic Labour Party. He briefly edited the newspaper Trøndelag Social-Demokrat. He soon backed out of partisan politics. He died in October 1951 in Oslo.

Media offices
Preceded by Anders Buen	Chief editor of Social-Demokraten; 1903–1906	Succeeded by Carl Jeppesen
