= Det 20de Århundre =

Norwegian political magazine

- Editor: Arvid G. Hansen (1920–1923); Håkon Meyer (1929–1934); Arne Ording and Finn Moe (from 1936)
- Categories: Political magazine
- Publisher: Norwegian Labour Party
- Founded: 1900s
- Country: Norway
- Based in: Oslo
- Language: Norwegian

Det 20de Århundre ("The Twentieth Century") was a periodical published by the Norwegian Labour Party. It was based in Oslo.

== History and profile ==
Its purpose was to print background articles on ideology and issues. For news, the party had a full network of newspapers, with Arbeiderbladet (earlier names: Vort Arbeide and Social-Demokraten) as the leading organ.

Editor from 1920 to 1923 was Arvid G. Hansen. From 1929 its editor was Håkon Meyer, but he was fired in 1934 for deviating political views. From 1936 it was edited by Arne Ording and Finn Moe.

In 1911 it published a text which was written by internationally known antisemite Theodor Fritsch, and translated by the Norwegian antisemitic writer Eivind Saxlund. Saxlund had also written a preface. The text was both antisemitic and racist in general. The periodical printed a rebuttal in the next issue, but in 1912 Saxlund had an article of his own in print. In it, he lamented a recent "coolie shipment" of 25 Galician labour immigrants; this he perceived as a threat because of possible "miscegenation".
