= Social Democratic Labour Party of Norway =

- Founded: 1921
- Dissolved: 1927
- Split from: Labour Party
- Merged into: Labour Party
- Ideology: Social-democracy; Anti-communism
- Political position: Centre-left
- International affiliation: Labour and Socialist International

The Social Democratic Labour Party of Norway (in Norwegian Norges Socialdemokratiske Arbeiderparti) was a Norwegian political party in the 1920s. Following the Labour Party's entry into the Comintern in 1919 its right wing left the party to form the Social Democratic Labour Party in 1921. At the party convention in 1923, however, the Labour Party withdrew from Comintern, and the Communist Party of Norway was formed by the minority, who continued its affiliation with Comintern and the Soviet Union until 1991. The Social Democratic Labour Party was absorbed into the reorganised Labour Party in 1927.

The youth wing of the party was the Socialist Youth League of Norway.

The party sympathized with the International Working Union of Socialist Parties from 1921 to 1923 and was a member of the Labour and Socialist International between 1923 and 1927.

== Party Congresses ==
1. landsmøte 1921
2. landsmøte May 1922
3. landsmøte våpren 1924

== Election results ==
Storting
Election	Votes		Seats		Role
Election	#	%	#	±	Role
1921	83,629	9.2	8 / 150	New	in opposition
1924	85,743	8.8	8 / 150	0	in opposition
