= Maria Blum =

German politician and journalist

Member of the Reichstag for the 12th district
- In office November 1932 – February/March 1933

Personal details
- Born: 27 October 1890 Schwabmünchen, Augsburg, Germany
- Died: 11 May 1965 (aged 74) East Berlin, East Germany
- Party: Social Democratic Party of Germany; Independent Social Democratic Party of Germany; Communist Party of Germany; Socialist Unity Party of Germany

Maria Blum (born Maria Holl: 27 October 1890 - 11 May 1965) was a German politician (KPD). Between November 1932 and February/March 1933 she sat as a member of the national parliament (Reichstag), representing Electoral District 12 (Thüringia).

== Life ==
Maria Holl was born at Schwabmünchen, a small town in the hills south of Augsburg. Slightly unusually for the time, according to her later entry in the official handbook of Reichgstag members, the family were not members of the church. They worked from home, making brooms and brushes. She attended school locally and then took a series of jobs locally, including work as an embroidery trainer and as a maid-servant on a farm. Next she moved to Munich where she took a job as a sales assistant. It was in Berlin that she got to know Jakob Blum, an active member of the Social Democratic Party (SPD) whom she subsequently married.

They moved to Berlin in 1912. The First World War broke out in July 1914. From the outset Maria Blum was an anti-war activist. She was conscripted to work at a munitions factory in Berlin's Spandau quarter. In August 1917 the couple relocated to Bad Kreuznach which was Jakob Blum's home town. Maria Blum had herself been a member of the SPD since before the war. She was one of many party members deeply critical of the decision by the party leadership to implement what amounted to a parliamentary truce over funding for the war. In 1917 the party finally split over the issue of support for the war. Maria Blum moved across to the newly launched break-away Independent Social Democratic Party (USPD). During the series of revolutions that erupted during 1918/1919 she was one of the senior USPD officers. She became involved in smuggling across to Luxembourg revolutionary activists who had found themselves sought by the police, and in August 1920 she herself moved to Luxembourg.

During the final months of 1920 she was involved in setting up the Communist Party of Luxembourg, which led to the loss of her residence permit in 1921. She returned to Germany, where, following a political reconfiguration on the political left, the USPD had been subsumed into the recently launched Communist Party of Germany (KPD), which she joined. Settling in Cologne she became a member of the KPD Central Rhine Women's Section.

During 1923 she was sent to study at the Party Academy in Jena. From 1925, still at this stage based in Cologne, she was employed as an editor in the party's large press section. In 1926 she became a member of the party's Trotskyite Leftwing Opposition movement, although she would remain a member of the mainstream Communist Party through the fragmentation of the later 1920s. Between 1927 and 1929 she worked on the Arbeiterzeitung ('Workers' Newspaper') in Aachen. From 1928 that was combined with an editorial position on the Thüringer Volkszeitung ('Thüringian People's Newspaper') published at this stage in Jena, though shortly afterwards the operation moved to nearby Erfurt. In 1928 the criminal court in Leipzig sentenced her to an eighteen month jail term. The charge was the familiar one for political activists in Germany of 'preparing to commit high treason', although sources are silent as to the details of what it was she was deemed by the court to have done.

In the general election of September 1930 there was a turnout of 82%, indicating that many voters who had stayed away from previous elections now came out to register a vote. The mainstream parties lost vote share, whilst the National Socialist German Workers Party ('Nazi Party') and, to a lesser extent, the Communist Party made gains in terms both of vote share and of the number of seats in the resulting Reichstag. Maria Blum was elected to the Reichstag as a Communist Party member, representing Electoral District 12 (Thüringia). Sources are not wholly consistent on the dates of Maria Blum's imprisonment: one source refers to her having been imprisoned on 8 July 1930, incarcerated at Preungesheim on the edge of Frankfurt. She was, however, let out in order to attend parliamentary sittings in Berlin. Around this time, desperate to try and defuse the political temperature, the government implemented a major amnesty for political prisoners, during the course of which, late in 1930 or early in 1931, Maria Blum was released. She moved to Berlin, where she joined the National Women's Department of the Party Central Committee.

Political and economic conditions continued to deteriorate, and 1932 was a year of two general elections. The principal gainers in the general election of July 1932 were again Nazi Party candidates, who saw the Nazi vote share reaching its all-time high point (for a democratically structured general election) at 37%. The Communist vote share increased marginally, to 13% but Maria Blum was not elected. Later that year the November general election saw further small gains for the Communists, while the Nazi vote share fell back to 33%. Maria Blum returned to the Reichstag, now representing the Merseburg electoral district.

The result of the November 1932 election left the Nazis and the Communists together holding 296 Reichstag seats, which was more than 50% of the seat total of 584. The more moderate parties, even if they had been able to form a coalition between themselves, could not have commanded a parliamentary majority without co-operation from one or other of the extreme parties. Despite the parliamentary stalemate, following deft political machinations the Nazis, with the conditional agreement of President Hindenburg, took power in January 1933 and lost no time in transforming Germany into a one-party dictatorship. Following the Reichstag fire at the end of February 1933, which was blamed on "communists" with implausible haste, the authorities were particularly ferocious in attacking communist activists. Maria Blum continued her (now illegal) political work till June 1933 at which point she was arrested. She suffered serious abuse, but by the end of that year she had been released: she emigrated to Moscow.

In Moscow, between 1934 and 1936, using the party name "Maria Herbst", she studied at the so-called 'West University'. In 1937 she started teaching at evening classes for exiled German workers, and from 1938 she was working in an "Emigrant Home". In June 1941 the Berlin government turned its back on the non-aggression pact with Moscow and launched a massive land invasion of the Soviet Union. Several thousand German political refugees who had been living in Moscow were unceremoniously sent into internal exile. Maria Blum was exiled to Tomsk in Western Siberia. She was able to return to Germany only in August 1947.

A large part of central Germany was administered, after May 1945, as the Soviet occupation zone. It would be relaunched in October 1949 as the German Democratic Republic. It was here, still using her Soviet party name, Maria Herbst, that she settled. She lost no time in joining the recently launched Socialist Unity Party (SED), by now well on its way to becoming the ruling party in East Germany. She spent several months as a patient in a sanatorium and then, in January 1948, took a job with the newly converted party academy near Schwerin at Castle Wiligrad. Between 1954 and 1958 she was employed at the party's Marxism-Leninism Institute in Berlin, where she was entrusted with care of the important literary estate of Ernst Thälmann.

Maria Blum (Herbst) died on 11 May 1965 in East Berlin.
