= Social Democratic Working Group =

Faction of the Social Democratic Party of Germany

The Social Democratic Working Group (German: Sozialdemokratische Arbeitsgemeinschaft; SAG), also known as the Haase-Ledebour Group, was a factional split of 18 members of the Social Democratic Party of Germany (SPD) in the Reichstag of the German Empire, which was formed during the First World War under the chairmanship of Hugo Haase.

== History ==
Under the leadership of Hugo Haase, a group of SPD deputies voted against war credits in the Reichstag on 21 December 1915, breaking with the rest of the SPD parliamentary group for the first time, which otherwise voted strongly in favor of the war. On 24 March 1916, Haase delivered an anti-war speech in the Reichstag, in which he also denounced the conditions of malnutrition and hunger among parts of the population, conditions he attributed to the government. Haase's speech was shouted down so violently (the SPD's central organ at the time, Vorwärts, described them as "...scenes of turmoil such as have probably never been seen before in the Reichstag, as passionate as they were shameful and deplorable...") that at times not a word could be understood. In another vote held during the same session, there were again dissenting votes, this time against the emergency budget presented by the government, which the rest of the SPD approved. On the grounds of breach of discipline and disloyalty, the 18 rogue deputies were expelled from the SPD parliamentary group in a subsequent meeting.

In April 1917, the Independent Social Democratic Party of Germany (USPD) emerged from the SAG.

The two other opponents of the war among the SPD Reichstag deputies, Karl Liebknecht and Otto Rühle, who had already voted against war credits on 20 March 1915, and left the SPD parliamentary group in January 1916 (by exclusion or resignation), did not belong to the SAG.

== Members ==
- Eduard Bernstein
- Wilhelm Bock
- Oskar Cohn
- Otto Büchner
- Wilhelm Dittmann (board member)
- Friedrich Geyer
- Hugo Haase (board member)
- Alfred Henke
- Joseph Herzfeld
- Georg Horn
- Fritz Kunert
- Georg Ledebour (board member)
- Theodor Schwartz
- Arthur Stadthagen
- Karl Wilhelm Stolle
- Ewald Vogtherr
- Emanuel Wurm
- Fritz Zubeil

== See also ==
- Burgfriedenspolitik

== Sources ==
- Dieter Engelmann, Horst Naumann: Hugo Haase. Lebensweg und politisches Vermächtnis eines streitbaren Sozialisten. Edition Neue Wege, Berlin 1999, ISBN 3-88348-216-1.
- Eugen Prager: Geschichte der USPD. Berlin 1921, OCLC 162611173.
- Robert F. Wheeler: USPD und Internationale. Sozialistischer Internationalismus in der Zeit der Revolution. Ullstein, Frankfurt am Main 1975, ISBN 3-550-07317-8.
