= Karl Liebknecht =

German socialist politician (1871–1919)

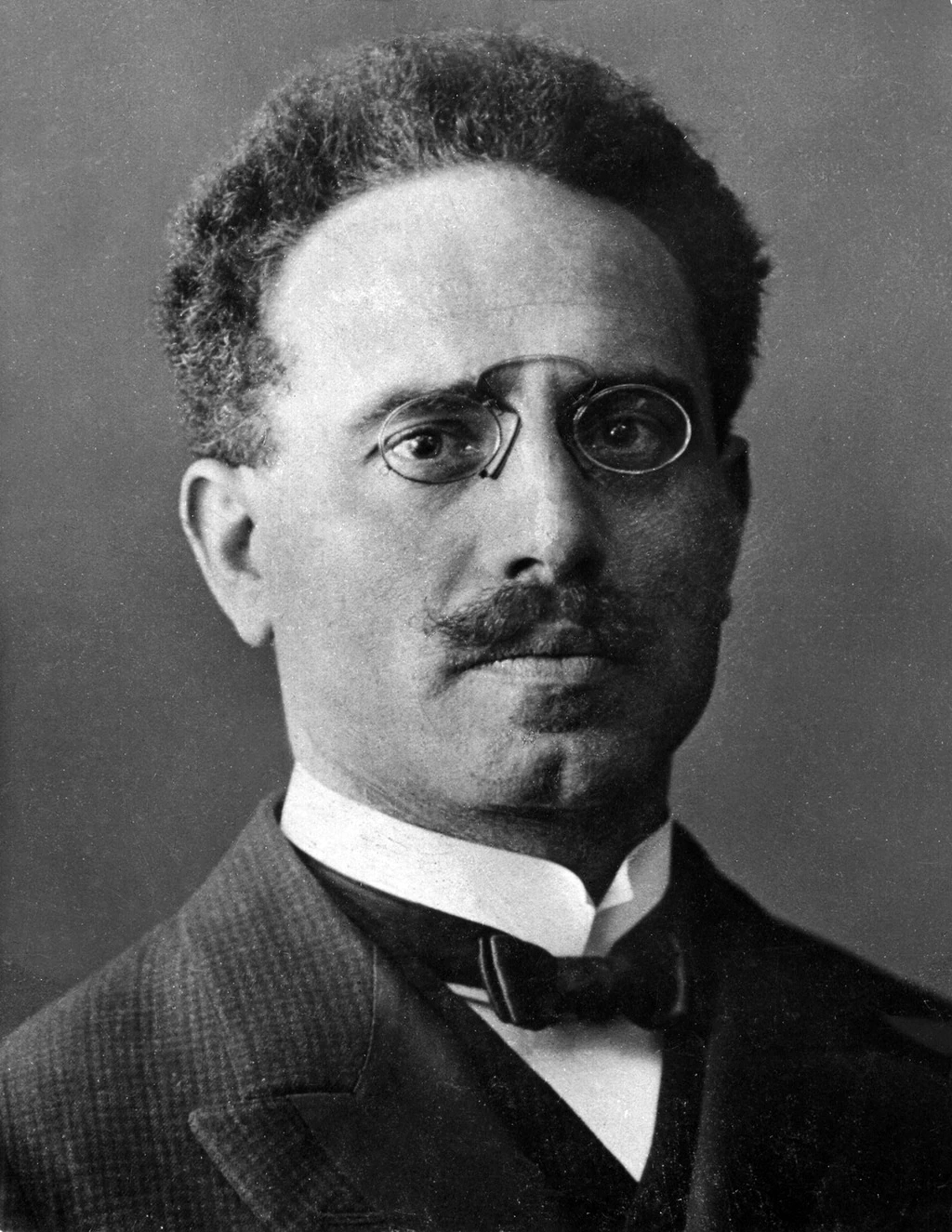
- Liebknecht in the 1910s

Member of the Reichstag for Potsdam 7
- In office 7 February 1912 – 26 October 1918
- Preceded by: August Pauli
- Succeeded by: Constituency abolished

Personal details
- Born: Karl Paul August Friedrich Liebknecht; 13 August 1871 Leipzig, Kingdom of Saxony, German Empire
- Died: 15 January 1919 (aged 47) Berlin, German Republic
- Cause of death: Extrajudicial execution
- Party: SPD (1900–1916); USPD (1917–1919); KPD (1919)
- Other political affiliations: Spartacus League (1914–1918)
- Spouses: Julia Paradies (m. 1900; died 1911); Sophie Ryss Liebknecht (m. 1912)
- Children: 3
- Parents: Wilhelm Liebknecht; Natalie Reh Liebknecht
- Relatives: Theodor Liebknecht (brother)
- Education: University of Berlin
- Occupation: Lawyer; Politician; Revolutionary

Military service
- Allegiance: German Empire
- Branch/service: Imperial German Army; Prussian Army
- Years of service: 1893–1894; 1915–1916
- Battles/wars: World War I; Western Front; Eastern Front
- Central institution membership: 1919: Full member, KPD Zentrale

Karl Paul August Friedrich Liebknecht (/ˈliːpknɛxt/; German: [ˈliːpknɛçt]; 13 August 1871 – 15 January 1919) was a German socialist politician and revolutionary. A leader of the far-left wing of the Social Democratic Party of Germany (SPD), Liebknecht was a co-founder of both the Spartacus League and Communist Party of Germany (KPD) along with Rosa Luxemburg.

Liebknecht was born in Leipzig as the son of SPD co-founder Wilhelm Liebknecht, and studied law and political economy. In 1907, he was imprisoned a year for writing an anti-militarism pamphlet, and in 1912 was elected to the Reichstag.

After the start of World War I, he vehemently opposed the SPD's support for the German war effort, co-founding the Spartacus League and beginning to call for revolution. Liebknecht was expelled from the party for his views in 1916, and again imprisoned for leading an anti-war demonstration. In 1917, the Spartacus League joined the Independent Social Democratic Party (USPD).

Liebknecht was released shortly before the November Revolution, during which he proclaimed Germany a "Free Socialist Republic" from the Berlin Palace on 9 November 1918. In December, his call to make Germany a soviet republic was rejected by the majority of the Reich Congress of Workers' and Soldiers' Councils, after which he became a founder of the KPD.

In January 1919, Liebknecht helped lead the failed Spartacist uprising against the SPD-ruled Weimar Republic, after which he and Luxemburg were captured and summarily executed by anti-communist Freikorps paramilitaries. Since their deaths, both Liebknecht and Luxemburg have become martyrs for the communist and socialist cause in Germany, throughout Europe and worldwide. Commemoration of the two continues to play an important role among the German left to this day.

== Life ==
=== Background ===
Karl Paul August Friedrich Liebknecht was born in Leipzig in 1871, the second of the five sons of Wilhelm Liebknecht and his second wife Natalie (née Reh). His father, along with August Bebel, was one of the founders and key leaders of the SPD and its precursor parties. Karl was baptised a Lutheran in St. Thomas Church. According to the Liebknecht family tradition, their lineage was directly descended from the theologian and founder of Reformation, Martin Luther. His godparents included Karl Marx and Friedrich Engels, who were not present at the baptism but had written declarations of their godparenthood.

As a child in the early 1880s, Liebknecht lived in Borsdorf, now located on the eastern outskirts of Leipzig. His father had moved into a suburban villa there with August Bebel after they were expelled from Leipzig under the 'Lesser State of Siege', a provision of the Anti-Socialist Laws directed against socialist, social democratic and communist associations and writings. The laws were in force from 1878 to 1890.

=== Studies ===
In 1890 he graduated from the Alte Nikolaischule in Leipzig and on 16 August 1890 began studying law and administrative cameral sciences at Leipzig University. He studied there with jurist Bernhard Windscheid, jurist and theologian Rudolph Sohm, economist Lujo Brentano, psychologist Wilhelm Wundt, and art historian Anton Springer. When the family moved to Berlin in October 1890, he continued his studies at the Friedrich Wilhelm University (now the Humboldt University of Berlin), where he attended lectures by historian Heinrich von Treitschke and economist Gustav Schmoller. His certificate of academic completion is dated 7 March 1893. On 29 May 1893, he passed his examination for higher civil service posts (Referendarexamen).

Liebknecht then did his military service as a one-year volunteer with the Guard Pioneer Battalion, a unit of the Prussian Army, in Berlin in 1893 and 1894.

After a long search for a position, he wrote his doctoral thesis "Compensation Enforcement and Compensation Pleas According to Common Law" (Compensationsvollzug und Compensationsvorbringen nach gemeinem Rechte), which was awarded a magna cum laude by the Law and Political Science Faculty of the Julius Maximilian University of Würzburg in 1897. On 5 April 1899 he passed the examination for candidates to the higher civil service career path with a "good".

=== Legal career ===
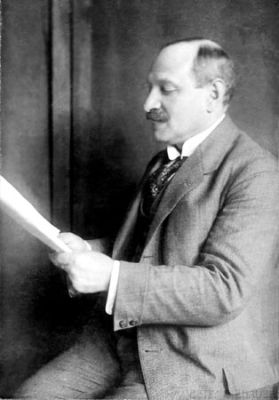
Hugo Haase in 1905

With his brother Theodor and the socialist and Zionist Oskar Cohn, he opened a law office in Berlin in 1899. In May of the following year he married Julia Paradies, with whom he had two sons, Wilhelm and Robert, and a daughter Vera.

He joined the Social Democratic Party (SPD) in 1900 and in 1904, along with his colleague Hugo Haase, he became known abroad as a political lawyer when he defended nine Social Democrats, among them the Pole Franciszek Trąbalski, in the Königsberg Secret Society trial. In other high profile criminal trials, he denounced the class-based justice of the empire and the brutal treatment of recruits in the military.

=== Treason trial ===
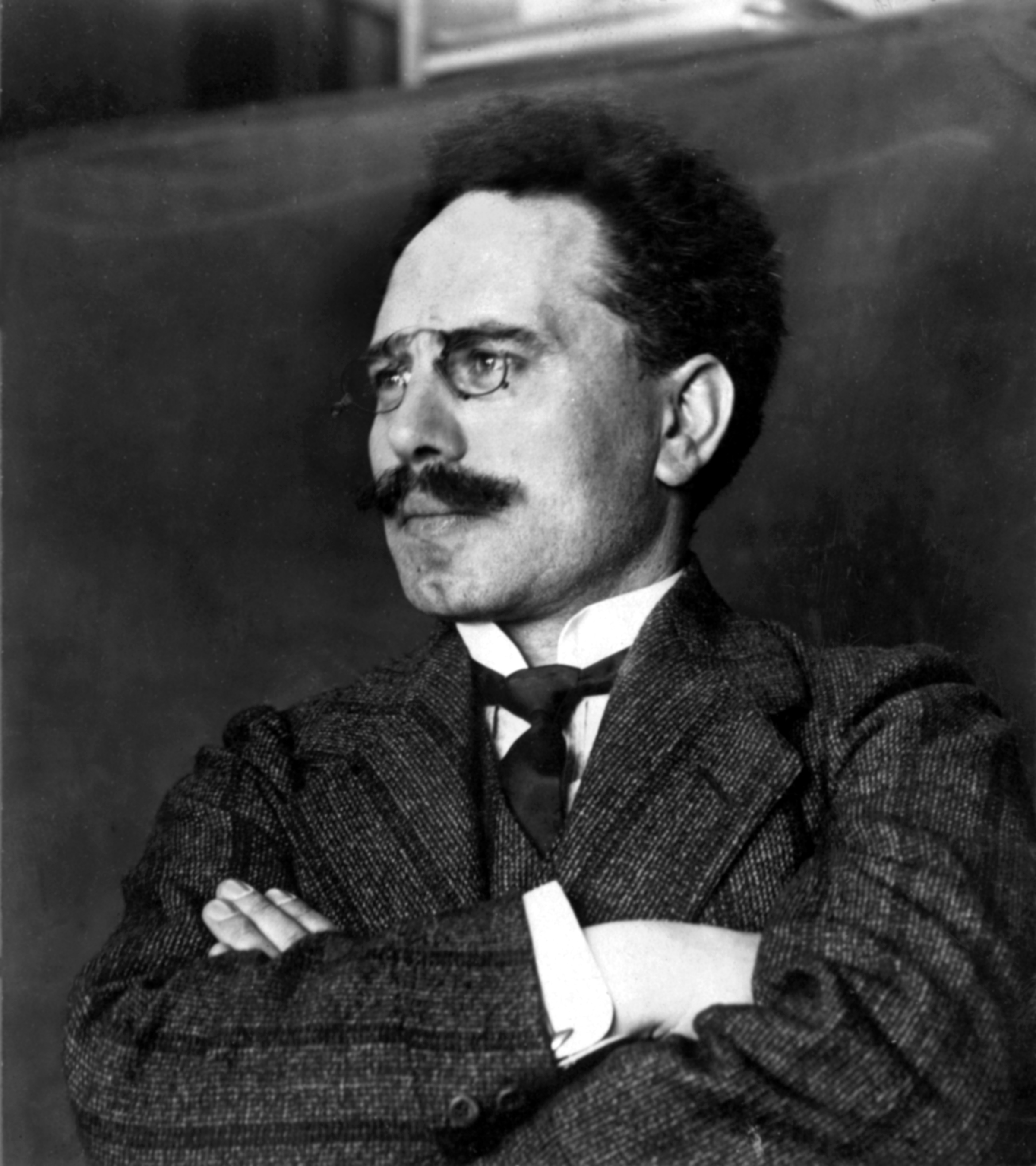
Liebknecht c. 1911

From 1907 to 1910 Liebknecht was president of the International Union of Socialist Youth, where he frequently spoke out against militarism. In 1907 he published Militarism and Anti-Militarism as part of the SPD Youth. In the work he argued that against an external enemy, external militarism required chauvinistic obstinacy, and against an internal enemy, internal militarism required a lack of understanding or hatred of any progressive movement. Militarism also needed an impassive people so that the masses could be driven like a herd of cattle. Anti-militarist agitation, he said, must educate about the dangers of militarism, but it must do so within the framework of the law – a statement that the Reich Court of Justice did not accept when Liebknecht was brought to trial for treason. He characterized the spirit of militarism with a reference to a remark by the Prussian Minister of War at the time, General Karl von Einem, according to whom a soldier loyal to the king who shoots badly is preferable to one who shoots well but whose political convictions are questionable. On 17 April 1907 von Einem asked the Reich Prosecutor's Office to initiate criminal proceedings against Liebknecht on account of the pamphlet.

The treason trial against Liebknecht took place before the Reich Court of Justice, presided over by Judge Ludwig Treplin, on 9, 10 and 12 October 1907, with a large public presence. On the first day of the trial, Liebknecht said that imperial orders were null and void if their purpose was a breach of the constitution. (In the court's final ruling, it emphasized that the soldiers' unconditional duty of obedience to the emperor was a central provision of the constitution of the empire.) When Liebknecht responded to a question from the presiding judge by saying that various newspapers as well as the conservative politician Elard von Oldenburg-Januschau were calling for a violent breach of the constitution, the judge cut him off, saying that he could allege that statements had been made in his courtroom that he had understood to be an incitement to a breach of the constitution. On the third day of the trial, Liebknecht was sentenced to one and a half years imprisonment (Festungshaft) for acts preliminary to high treason.

Emperor Wilhelm II, who had a copy of Militarism and Anti-Militarism, was informed about the Liebknecht trial several times by telegraph. He received a detailed report after the verdict was pronounced, but Liebknecht was not sent a copy of the written verdict until 7 November. His self-defense at the trial brought him considerable popularity among Berlin's workers, and a throng of people escorted him to prison.

=== Member of the Prussian Parliament and the Reichstag ===
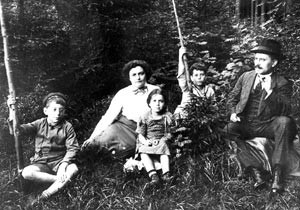
Sophie and Karl Liebknecht with the children from his first marriage

In 1908 Liebknecht became a member of the Prussian House of Representatives even though he had not yet been released from prison in Silesia. He was one of the first eight Social Democrats to become a member of the Prussian state parliament, despite the Prussian three-class franchise that gave more weight to higher-income voters. Liebknecht remained a member of the state parliament until 1916.

His wife Julia died on 22 August 1911 after a gall bladder operation. Liebknecht married Sophie Ryss (1884–1964) in October 1912.

Following the national election of January 1912, Liebknecht, who was just 40, entered the Reichstag as one of the youngest SPD deputies. After unsuccessful attempts in 1903 and 1907, he won the "imperial constituency" of Potsdam-Spandau-Osthavelland, which until then had been the safe domain of the German Conservative Party. In the Reichstag he immediately emerged as a staunch opponent of an army bill that would grant the emperor tax funds for armaments for the army and navy. He was also able to prove that the Krupp company, a large steel and armaments firm, had illegally obtained economically important information by bribing employees of the War Ministry (the so-called Kornwalzer scandal).

=== First World War ===
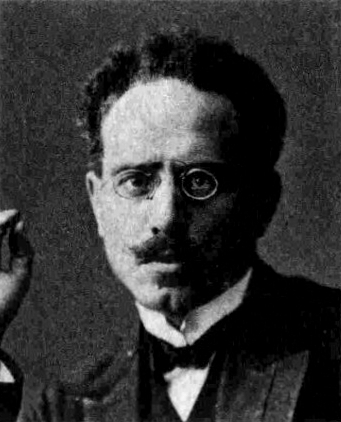
Liebknecht c. 1910

In the first half of July 1914 Liebknecht traveled to Belgium and France, where he met with socialist politicians Jean Longuet and Jean Jaurès and spoke at several events. He spent the French national holiday in Paris. He only became aware of the danger of a European war on 23 July, after the Austro-Hungarian ultimatum to Serbia became known (the July Crisis). At the end of July, he returned to Germany via Switzerland.

On 1 August, the day mobilization was announced and war declared on Russia, the Reichstag was summoned for a 4 August session. At the time there was still no question in Liebknecht's mind that "the rejection of war loans was self-evident and unquestionable for the majority of the SPD Reichstag faction". In the party's preparatory meeting on 3 August, there were, according to SPD representative Wolfgang Heine, "vile, noisy scenes" because Liebknecht and 13 other deputies spoke out decisively against war loans. In the 4 August parliamentary session, however, the Social Democratic faction voted unanimously in favor of approving the loans that enabled the government to finance the initial war effort.

Before the parliamentary group meeting on 3 August, those in favor of the approval had not expected such a success and had been by no means sure of even obtaining a majority in the SPD parliamentary group. Even during the break in the session after Reich Chancellor Theobald von Bethmann Hollweg's speech, immediately before the vote, there was turmoil among the SPD deputies because some had demonstratively applauded the Chancellor's remarks. Liebknecht, who in the years before had repeatedly defended the unwritten rules of party discipline (i.e. unanimity) against representatives of the party's right wing, bowed to the decision of the majority and also voted for the government bill in the Reichstag's full session. Hugo Haase, who like Liebknecht had opposed the loan in the parliamentary group, agreed for similar reasons to read the statement of the parliamentary group majority, which was received with jubilation by the bourgeois parties. Liebknecht often thought about or discussed the events of 4 August, both privately and in public. He saw them as a catastrophic political and personal watershed. In 1916, he noted:

"The defection of the majority of the parliamentary group came as a surprise even to the pessimists; the atomization of the hitherto predominant radical wing no less so. The importance of the credit approval in the shift of the faction's entire policy to the government camp was not obvious: there was still the hope that the decision of 3 August was the result of a temporary panic and would soon be corrected, or at least not repeated and even overridden. These and similar considerations, but also uncertainty and weakness, explained the failure of the attempt to win over the minority for a separate public vote. But what must not be overlooked is the sacred veneration that was still paid to party discipline at that time, and most of all by the radical wing that until then had had to defend itself ever more pointedly against breaches of discipline, or tendencies to break discipline, on the part of revisionist party members."

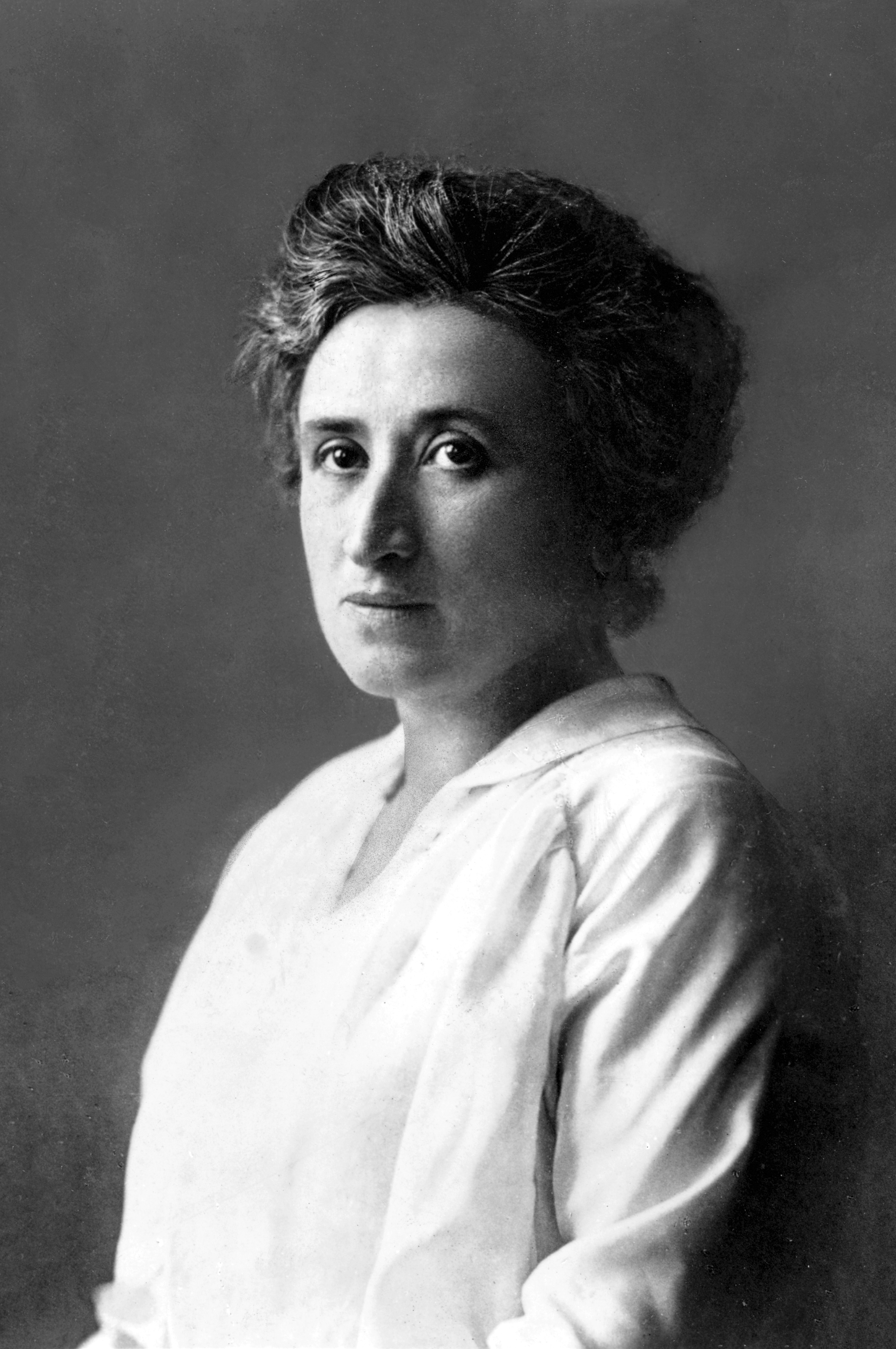
Rosa Luxemburg

Liebknecht expressly did not endorse a statement by Rosa Luxemburg and Franz Mehring (its complete text is thought to have been lost), in which they threatened to leave the party because of its conduct. He "felt that it was a half-measure: in such a case one would already have had to leave." Luxemburg formed the International Group on 5 August 1914, to which Liebknecht along with ten other SPD leftists belonged and that attempted to form an inner-party opposition to the SPD's Burgfriedenspolitik – a political truce under which the SPD voted for the war loans, all parties agreed not to criticize the government or the war, and the trade unions refrained from striking. In the summer and fall of 1914 Liebknecht and Luxemburg traveled throughout Germany to try to persuade – with little success – opponents of the war to reject financial support for the war. He also contacted other European workers' parties to show them that not all German Social Democrats were in favor of the war.

Liebknecht's first major conflict with the new party line, one which attracted wide public attention, came when he traveled to Belgium between 4 and 12 September, in the middle of the 3-month long German invasion of the country. There he met with local socialists and was informed – in Liège and Andenne, among other places – about the mass reprisals ordered by the German military against alleged attacks by Belgian civilians. Liebknecht was accused in the press – including by Social Democratic papers – of "treason against the fatherland" and "party treason" and had to justify himself before the party executive on 2 October.

After that he was all the more determined to vote against the new loan bill and to make it a demonstrative statement against the "unity phase's high tide" and for it to be the basis for rallying opponents of the war. In the run-up to the 2 December 1914 session, he tried and failed to win other opposition deputies over to his position. Otto Rühle, who had previously assured Liebknecht that he would also openly vote no, was not able to withstand the party pressure and stayed away from the full session. Liebknecht was in the end the only deputy not to stand when Reichstag President Johannes Kaempf called on the House to approve the supplementary budget by rising from their seats. At the next vote on 20 March 1915, Rühle voted with Liebknecht. Both had previously refused a request from about 30 other party members to leave the chamber with them during the vote.

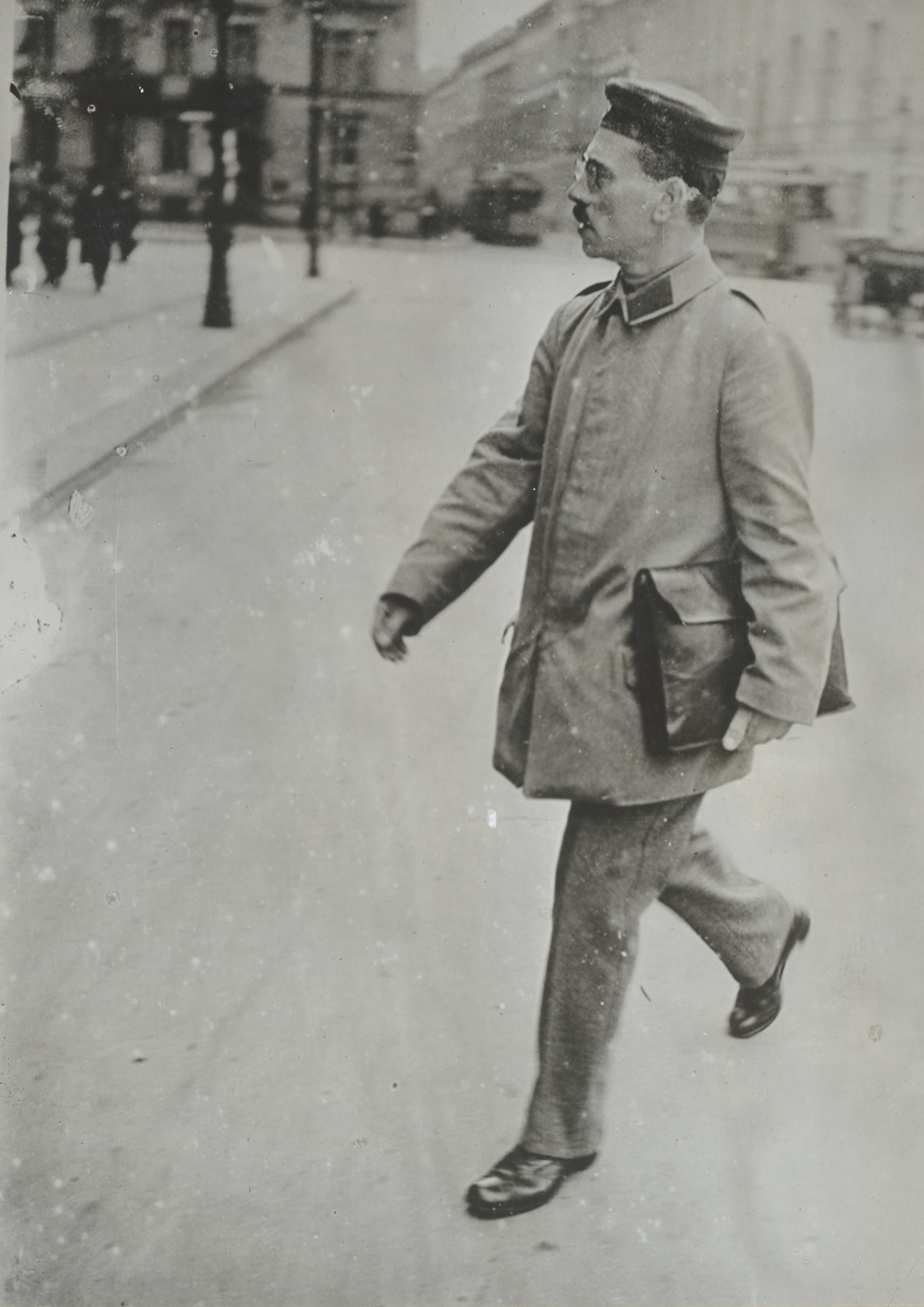
Liebknecht in uniform, 1919

In April 1915 Mehring and Luxemburg published the journal Die Internationale. It was immediately confiscated by the authorities and appeared only once. Liebknecht, however, was not able to participate in the venture. Since 2 December 1914, police and military authorities had been considering how to stop his activities. In early February 1915, the high command of the Prussian Army called him to serve in a construction battalion. He was therefore subject to the military laws that forbade any political activity outside his duties in the Reichstag and the Prussian Landtag. He went through the war on the Western and Eastern fronts as non-combatant soldier who was given leaves of absence for sessions of the Reichstag and Landtag.

He nevertheless succeeded in expanding the International Group and organizing the SPD's staunchest opponents of the war throughout the Reich. That gave rise to the Spartacus League on 1 January 1916; it was renamed the Spartacist League after its final break from social democracy in November 1918. On 12 January 1916, the SPD Reichstag membership expelled Liebknecht from its ranks by 60 votes to 25. In solidarity with him, Otto Rühle also resigned from the parliamentary group two days later. In March 1916 another 18 opposition deputies were expelled and subsequently formed the Social Democratic Working Group, which Liebknecht and Rühle did not join.

During the war Liebknecht had few opportunities to make himself heard in the Reichstag. Contrary to customary practice, the Reichstag president did not record in the official minutes the statement that Liebknecht had submitted in writing explaining his vote against the second war loan bill on 2 December 1914. Under various pretexts he was subsequently refused the parliamentary floor. It was not until 8 April 1916 that Liebknecht was able to speak from the rostrum on a lesser budget issue. This resulted in what deputy Wilhelm Dittmann called a "chaotic and scandalous scene" such as never before witnessed in the Reichstag. Liebknecht was shouted down by liberal and conservative deputies raging "as if possessed", insulted as a "scoundrel" and an "English spy" and told to "shut his mouth". One member snatched Liebknecht's written notes from him and threw the sheets into the hall, and another had to be prevented by members of the Social Democratic Working Group from physically attacking him.

At the Easter Youth Conference in Jena, Liebknecht spoke to 60 young people on anti-militarism and the changing of social conditions in Germany. On 1 May 1916 he led an antiwar demonstration in Berlin that had been planned by the Spartacus League. Even though the demonstrators were surrounded by police, he began his oration with the words "Down with the war! Down with the government!" He was arrested and charged with treason. On the first day of the trial, which was intended to be an example for the socialist left, a spontaneous solidarity strike organized by the Revolutionary Stewards took place in Berlin with over 50,000 participants. Instead of weakening the opposition, Liebknecht's arrest gave new impetus to opposition to the war. On 23 August 1916 Liebknecht was sentenced to four years and one month in prison, which he served at Luckau, Brandenburg from mid-November 1916 until his release under an amnesty on 23 October 1918. While Liebknecht was in prison, Hugo Haase, SPD chairman until March 1916, lobbied in vain for his release. In April 1917 the SPD split apart with the founding of the Independent Social Democratic Party of Germany (USPD), which the Spartacus group joined in order to work within it toward revolutionary goals.

Along with Eduard Bernstein and the Catholic Reichstag deputy Matthias Erzberger of the Centre Party – who like Liebknecht was later murdered by right-wing extremists – Liebknecht was one of the very few German parliamentarians to publicly denounce the human rights violations of Germany's Turkish-Ottoman allies such as the Armenian genocide and the brutal crackdown on other non-Turkish minorities, particularly in Syria and Lebanon. This practice was tacitly approved both by the liberal parties and by the majority SPD, which was politically allied with the Young Turk party CUP. In some cases support was even publicly justified on the grounds of Germany's strategic interests and the alleged existential threat to Turkey from Armenian and Arab terrorism.

=== November revolution 1918 ===
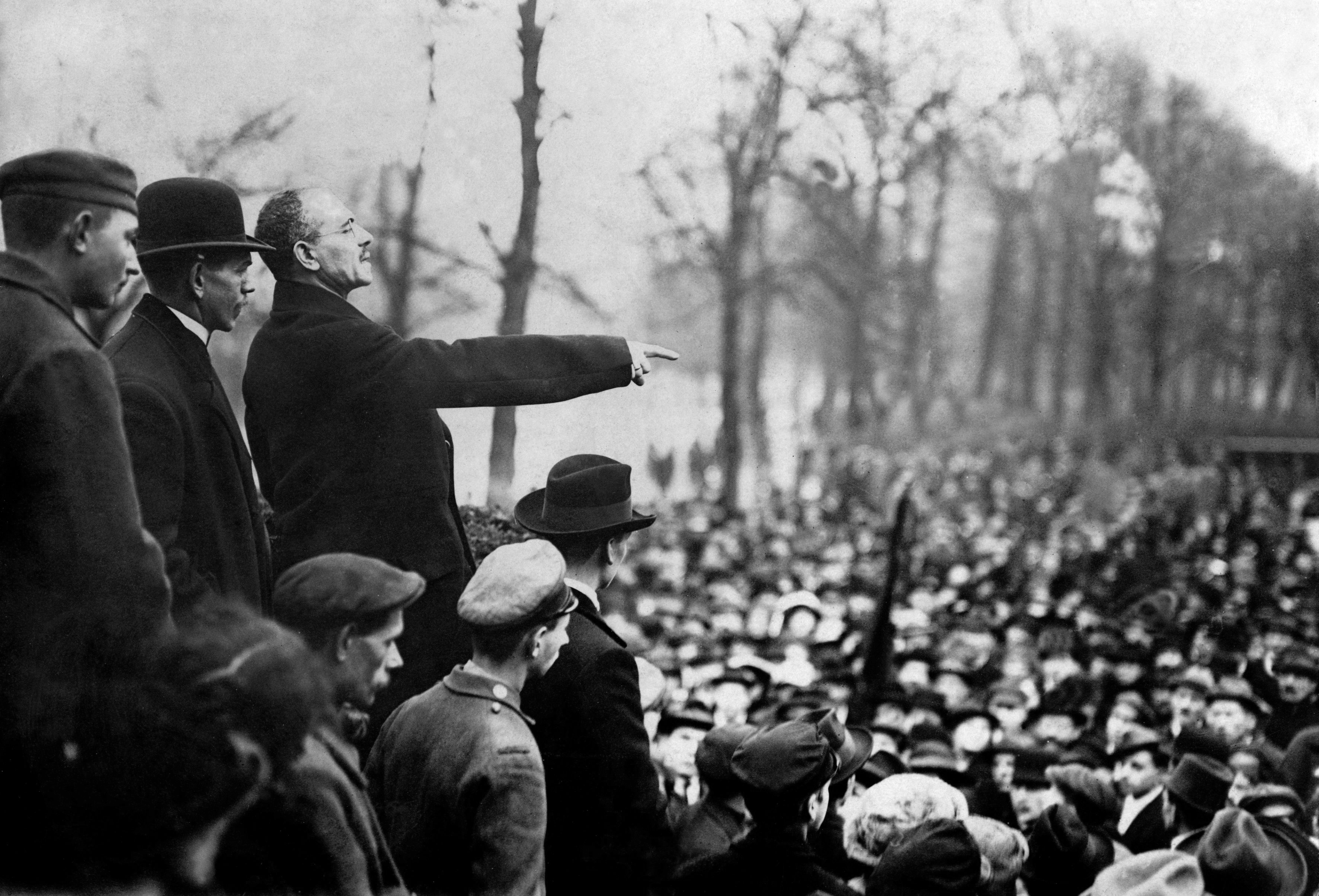
Liebknecht speaking at a rally in the Berlin Tiergarten. This photograph was later reproduced in KPD propaganda.

Liebknecht was released from prison on 23 October 1918 as part of a general amnesty that the Reich government hoped would act as a relief valve for the pre-revolutionary mood in the country. The hope proved illusory, since in Berlin, where Liebknecht went immediately, he was greeted by a cheering crowd at the Anhalter Station. A march set off in the direction of the Reichstag building but was pushed eastward by the Berlin police. In front of the Russian Embassy Liebknecht gave a speech in which he proclaimed: "Down with the Hohenzollerns! Long live the social republic of Germany!" The embassy, which since the Russian October Revolution of 1917 was representing a communist led country, then gave a reception in his honor.

Liebknecht set about reorganizing the Spartacus League, which then emerged as a political organization in its own right. He urged the Revolutionary Stewards, which had organized the January strike, and both the USPD's rank and file and the Spartacus League to jointly coordinate preparations for a nationwide revolution. They planned a simultaneous general strike in all major cities and parades of armed strikers in front of the barracks of army regiments in order to persuade them to either join or lay down their arms. The Stewards, guided by workers' sentiment in the factories and fearing an armed confrontation with army troops, postponed the date set for the revolution several times, finally to 11 November 1918. Liebknecht though was unable to win acceptance in his party for the plans. On 30 October 1918 the central executive committee of the USPD, whose members were thinking more of a revolution by peaceful means, rejected his ideas, as did a meeting between the USPD and the Revolutionary Stewards on 1 November.

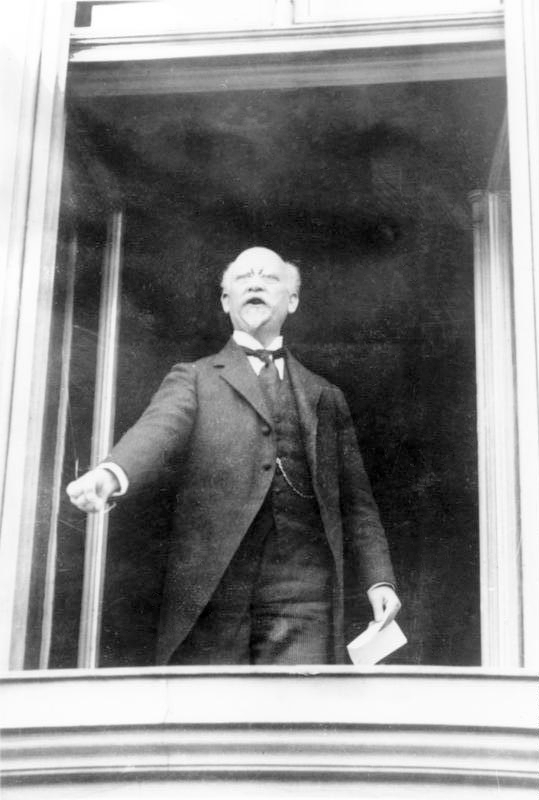
Philipp Scheidemann proclaims the German Republic at the Reichstag hours before Liebknecht's proclamation of the Free Socialist Republic at the Berlin Palace.

On 8 November the revolution sparked by the sailors' uprising in Kiel spread across Germany independently of Liebknecht's plans. Berlin's Revolutionary Stewards and USPD representatives called on their supporters to join the marches planned for the following day. On 9 November masses of people poured into the center of Berlin from all directions. From Gate 4 of the Berlin Palace, standing at the large window of the second floor, Liebknecht proclaimed the "Free Socialist Republic of Germany". Earlier that day Philipp Scheidemann of the SPD had proclaimed the "German Republic" from the Reichstag building.

Liebknecht then became the spokesman for the revolutionary left. In order to push the November Revolution in the direction of a socialist soviet republic, he and Rosa Luxemburg began publishing a daily newspaper, Die Rote Fahne ('The Red Flag'). In the ensuing disputes, however, it soon became apparent that most workers' representatives in Germany were pursuing social democratic rather than socialist goals. At the Congress of Workers' and Soldiers' Councils of 16–20 December 1918, a majority advocated early parliamentary elections and thus self-dissolution of the councils. Liebknecht and Luxemburg were excluded from participation.

Since December 1918, Friedrich Ebert (SPD), head of the Council of the People's Deputies that was acting as Germany's interim government, had been trying to take power away from the council movement with, if necessary, the help of the army. He was doing this in accordance with the secret Ebert-Groener pact, under which Wilhelm Groener, Quartermaster General of the German Army, had assured Ebert of the army's loyalty, in return for which Ebert had promised among other things to take prompt action against leftist uprisings. Ebert had troops assembled in and around Berlin for this purpose. On 6 December 1918 he attempted to use the military to prevent the Reich Congress of Workers' and Soldiers' Councils from taking place and, after that failed, to weaken the resolution the Congress had made for disempowering the military. On 24 December 1918, during the Berlin Christmas battles, he used military force for the first time, directing it against the People's Navy Division. It was close to the revolutionary Kiel sailors and was supposed to protect the Reich Chancellery for the Ebert government but was not prepared to leave its positions without pay. As a result of Ebert's successful military intervention against it, the three USPD representatives on the Council of People's Deputies resigned on 29 December, after which the council was made up of five SPD representatives.

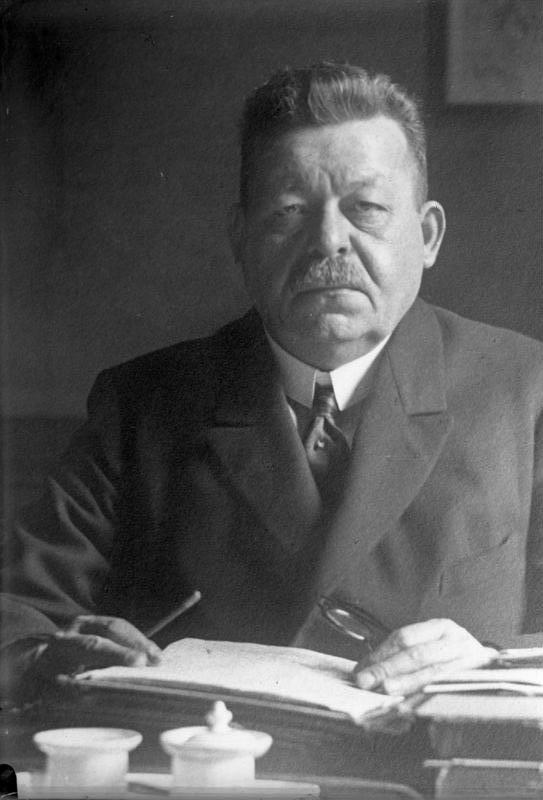
Friedrich Ebert

The Spartacists, who were gaining popularity throughout the Reich, made use of the military intervention to plan the founding of a new, left-wing revolutionary party and invited their supporters to its founding congress in Berlin at the end of December 1918. On 1 January 1919, the Communist Party of Germany (KPD) introduced itself to the public.

Beginning on 8 January, Liebknecht and other KPD members participated in the Spartacist uprising which began with a general strike and the occupation of several Berlin newspaper buildings. Liebknecht joined the strike leadership and, against the advice of Rosa Luxemburg, called for an armed insurrection to overthrow the Ebert government. KPD delegates tried without success to persuade some regiments stationed in and around Berlin to defect, and with only minimal support from the mass of the working classes of Berlin, the uprising failed to gain ground. When the government called out the military against the insurgents on 11 January, they were quickly overwhelmed. The total death toll is estimated at around 180.

== Death ==
The "intelligence services of numerous 'associations representing the interests of the state'" actively sought the leading figures of the KPD. In December 1918 numerous red, large-format posters directed against the Spartacus League were posted in Berlin, culminating in the demand "Beat their leaders to death! Kill Liebknecht!" Hundreds of thousands of handbills with the same content were also distributed. Eduard Stadtler's Anti-Bolshevik League was among those involved. In the SPD's newspaper Vorwärts (Forward), Liebknecht was repeatedly portrayed as "mentally ill". The entire Council of People's Deputies signed a leaflet on 8 January announcing that "the hour of reckoning is approaching". The following day the leaflet's text appeared as official news in the Deutscher Reichsanzeiger, the German Reich's newspaper of record. Rumors circulated among civilians and military personnel – spread by, among others, Philipp Scheidemann's son-in-law Fritz Henck – that bounties had been placed on the Spartacist leaders. On 14 January an article appeared in a newsletter of two Social Democratic regiments, stating that "the next few days" would show that "as for the heads of the movement … the gloves are now coming off".

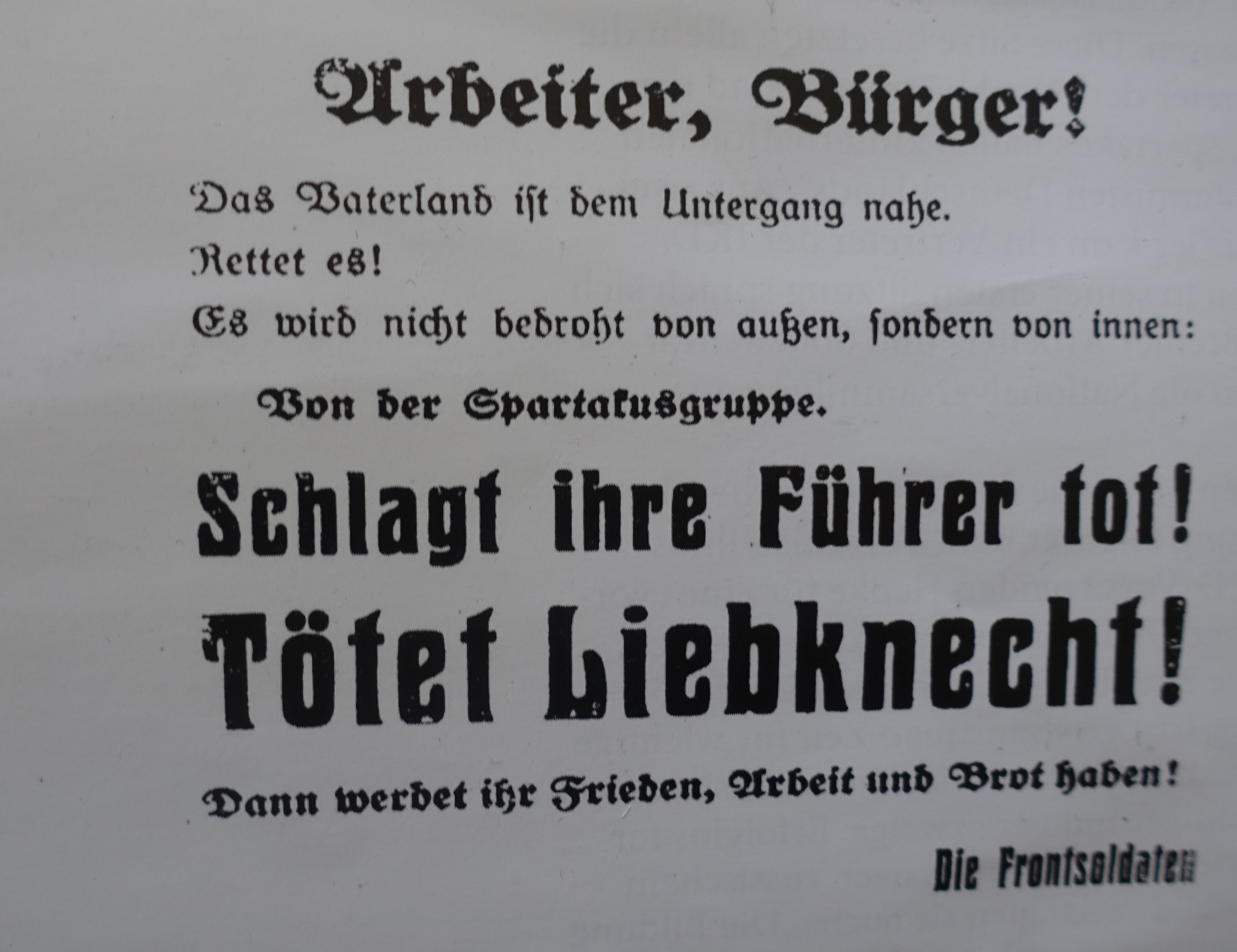
The placard reads: Workers! Citizens! The fatherland is close to ruin. Save It! It is not threatened from without but from within: the Spartacus Group. Beat their leaders to death! Kill Liebknecht! Then you will have peace, work, and bread. – The soldiers of the front.

Since their lives were now in danger, Liebknecht and Luxemburg went into hiding, initially in the Berlin suburb of Neukölln, but after two days they moved to new quarters in Berlin's Wilmersdorf neighborhood. The owner of the apartment, the merchant Siegfried Marcusson, was a member of the USPD and belonged to the Wilmersdorf Workers' and Soldiers' Council; his wife was a friend of Rosa Luxemburg. In the early evening of 15 January, five members of the Wilmersdorf Bürgerwehr – a middle class civilian militia – entered the apartment and arrested Liebknecht and Luxemburg. It is not known who tipped off the Bürgerwehr or gave it the order, but it is certain that it was a targeted raid, not a random search. Each person involved in the arrest received a reward of 1,700 marks from the chairman of the Wilmersdorf civic council. Around 9 p.m. Wilhelm Pieck, who was to become president of the German Democratic Republic (East Germany) from 1949 to 1960, entered the apartment unsuspectingly and was also arrested.

Liebknecht was first taken to the Wilmersdorf Cecilia School. From there a member of the Bürgerwehr called the Reich Chancellery and informed its deputy press chief, Robert Breuer of the Wilmersdorf SPD, that Liebknecht had been captured. Breuer said he would call back but reportedly did not. At about 9:30 p.m. members of the Bürgerwehr drove Liebknecht to their command office, the headquarters of the Guards Cavalry Rifle Division in the Eden Hotel. Liebknecht, who up to that point had denied who he was, was identified by the initials on his clothing in the presence of the de facto commander of the division, Captain Waldemar Pabst. After a few minutes of reflection, Pabst decided to have Liebknecht and Luxemburg, who was brought in around 10 p.m., "taken care of". He called the Reich Chancellery to discuss further action with Minister of Defense Gustav Noske. Noske urged him to consult with the commander in chief of the Provisional Reichswehr, General von Lüttwitz, and if possible obtain a formal order from him. Pabst said that it was out of the question, to which Noske replied, "Then you yourself must know what is to be done."

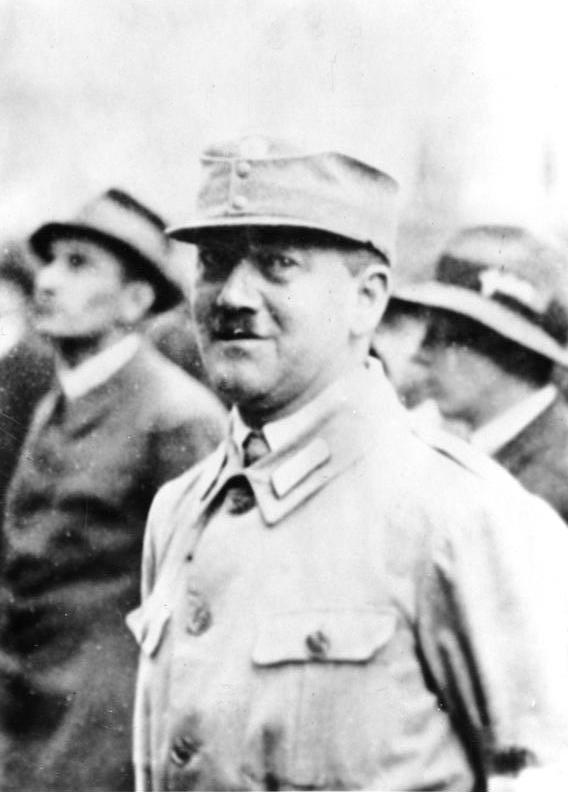
Waldemar Pabst

Pabst charged a group of naval officers under the command of Captain Lieutenant Horst von Pflugk-Harttung with carrying out Liebknecht's murder. (In January 1932 Pflugk-Harttung said in an interview that Noske had explicitly ordered Liebknecht's shooting, but when Noske publicly contradicted him, he claimed that he had been misunderstood by the journalist.) The officers left the hotel with Liebknecht at around 10:45 p.m., dressed in enlisted men's uniforms for disguise. As they were leaving, Liebknecht was spat on, insulted and struck by hotel guests. Just after he was put into a waiting car with the officers, Private Otto Runge, who had been promised money by a Guards Cavalry officer not privy to the full plan, hit him with the butt of his rifle. Lieutenant Rudolf Liepmann, who also had not been informed by Pabst of the intention to murder Liebknecht, drove the car to the nearby Tiergarten park. There he feigned a breakdown at a spot "where a completely unlit footpath branched off". Liebknecht was led away from the car and after a few meters shot from behind "at close range" by the shore of a lake. Shots were fired by von Pflugk-Harttung, Naval Lieutenant Heinrich Stiege, Naval First Lieutenant Ulrich von Ritgen and by Liepmann, who "instinctively joined in". Also present were Captain Heinz von Pflugk-Harttung, Horst's younger brother; Second Lieutenant Bruno Schulze; and Private Clemens Friedrich, the only enlisted man involved in the crime.

The perpetrators delivered the dead man as an "unknown body" to the ambulance station opposite the Eden Hotel at 11:15 p.m. and then reported to Pabst. Half an hour later, Luxemburg was taken away in an open car and shot about 40 meters from the entrance to the Eden Hotel, apparently by Naval Lieutenant Hermann Souchon. Her body was thrown into the Landwehr Canal by First Lieutenant Kurt Vogel and was not found until 31 May. Pabst's press officer Friedrich Grabowski subsequently circulated a communiqué stating that Liebknecht had been "shot while fleeing" and Luxemburg "killed by a mob".

In 1969, Pabst commented on the background to the murders in a private letter:

The fact is: the execution of my orders unfortunately did not take place as it should have. But it did take place, and for that these German idiots should thank Noske and me on their knees, erect monuments to us, and have streets and squares named after us! [Because Pabst thought that the murders had prevented Germany from becoming communist.] Noske was exemplary at the time, and the party [SPD] (except for its semi-communist left wing) behaved impeccably in the affair. That I could not carry out the action without Noske's approval (with Ebert in the background) and also that I had to protect my officers is clear. But very few people understood why I was never questioned or brought up on charges, and why the court-martial went the way it did, [Kurt] Vogel was freed from prison, and so on. As a man of honor, I responded to the behavior of the SPD of the time by keeping my mouth shut for 50 years about our cooperation. ... If it is not possible to skirt the truth and I get so angry I'm ready to explode, I will tell the truth, which I would like to avoid in the interest of the SPD.

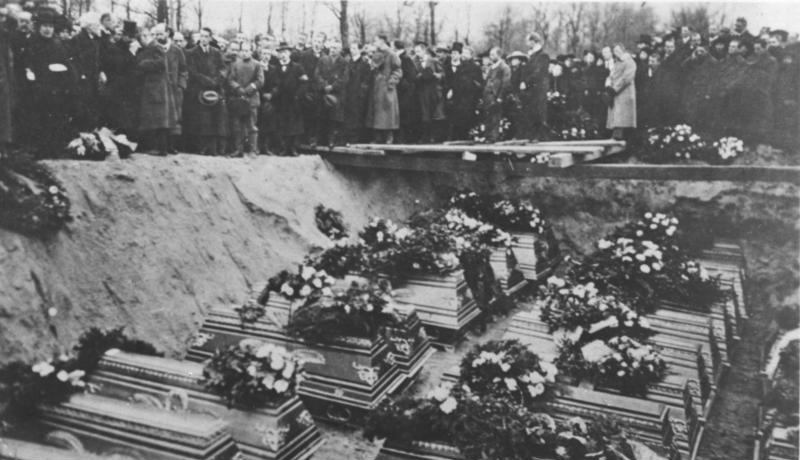
Burial on 25 January 1919 of Karl Liebknecht and 31 others killed in the Spartacist uprising

Liebknecht was buried on 25 January along with 31 other dead from the Spartacist uprising. The burial initially planned by the KPD at the Cemetery of the March Fallen in Friedrichshain was forbidden by both the government and Berlin's municipal authorities. Instead the burial commission was referred to the cemetery for the poor in Friedrichsfelde, then located on the urban periphery. The funeral procession turned into a mass demonstration in which several tens of thousands of people took part in spite of a massive military presence. Chairman Paul Levi spoke at the graves for the KPD and Luise Zietz and Rudolf Breitscheid for the USPD.

In 1926 the November Revolution Monument was dedicated at the gravesite of the militants in the Friedrichsfelde Cemetery. Nazi authorities had it demolished in 1935. The remains of Liebknecht and Rosa Luxemburg have never been definitively found or identified. In 1951, Liebknecht and Luxemburg were honoured with symbolic graves at the Memorial to the Socialists (German: Gedenkstätte der Sozialisten) in the Friedrichsfelde Cemetery.

== Prosecution of the murderers ==
The officers Horst von Pflugk-Harttung, Heinrich Stiege, Ulrich von Ritgen and Rudolf Liepmann have been regarded as the murderers of Karl Liebknecht. In addition, the officers Heinz von Pflugk-Harttung, Bruno Schulze and the soldier Clemens Friedrich were involved.

A civilian trial against the murderers of Liebknecht and Luxemburg did not take place, and an investigation into what lay behind them was not initiated. Only after the KPD, through its own investigations led by Leo Jogiches, had revealed the whereabouts of some of the perpetrators, did the Guard Cavalry open court-martial proceedings against them. The military court prosecutor Paul Jorns impeded the investigations, and in the main trial only Otto Runge and Kurt Vogel were sentenced to prison terms. The only officers charged, the von Pflugk-Harttung brothers, were acquitted. The verdicts were signed by Gustav Noske, who also arranged for the subsequent appeal proceedings to be discontinued. Runge and Vogel later received compensation for their time in prison from the National Socialists.

Heinz von Pflugk-Harttung later played a leading role in the Kapp Putsch. In 1920, he was killed in an explosion after grenades in his car accidentally detonated.

Pabst was neither prosecuted nor charged, and Vogel was helped to escape by Captain Lieutenant (later Admiral) Wilhelm Canaris three days after sentencing. Runge was recognized and beaten by workers in 1925 and 1931 after his release from prison. In June 1945, Runge, now 70, was tracked down by the NKVD in Berlin and handed over to the Soviet commandant's office on the instructions of senior prosecutor Max Berger. Runge was charged with murder, but his health later deteriorated. He died in prison in September 1945.

In 1946, the Counterintelligence Corps searched von Ritgen's home after his father-in-law reported him for his alleged involvement in the murder of Walther Rathenau. During the search, the CIC instead found evidence linking him to Liebknecht's murder. On the orders of the U.S. military occupation authorities, German police officers were forced to arrest von Ritgen and put him on trial. While in prison, he was treated as a "hero of freedom", and was later acquitted by the Kassel Higher Regional Court. Ritgen died in 1969.

== Political theory and Marxism ==
Since Liebknecht's main interest was political agitation, he rarely expressed himself in public on political theory and participated only minimally in the SPD's theoretical disputes, such as the debate on imperialism. He found leisure and calm for his studies only during his time in prison. That he grappled with questions of political theory and practice throughout his political life can be seen from the progress of his posthumously published "Studies on the Laws of Motion of Social Development" (Studien über die Bewegungsgesetze der gesellschaftlichen Entwicklung), which he began to work on in 1891. The philosophically oriented "Studies" consisted of the parts "Basic Concepts and Classification", "Contexts and Laws", and "Individual Cultural Phenomena". His aim was to revise and further develop Karl Marx's theory of scientific socialism with a more constitutive-constructive theory.

In Liebknecht's opinion, Marx had limited his theory too much to the era of capitalism and therefore had not been able to grasp the complexity of social development. He considered Marx's philosophical and economic foundations to be wrong because they were limited to the materialistic concept of history. Only through the spiritual and psychic essence of economic relations was a connection to human development possible, and through this alone would they be social phenomena. He rejected the labour theory of value because, in his view, labor could not, as the result of some sort of economic 'spontaneous generation', create surplus value beyond its own intrinsic value. The value of goods, including labor, was determined instead by the average societal prerequisites of production. For Liebknecht exploitation was purely a problem of distribution and not of production, as Marx had claimed. Value, he argued, was not a fact of capitalist society because it existed before and after capitalist development. His system would better show that the exploitation of the proletariat would take place through force and discrimination in the distribution of the total production of society.

His universal approach was based – unlike Marx's – on concepts of a philosophy of nature. He saw human society as a unified organism following a higher instinct of development, with the goal of a new, all-encompassing humanism. For him the history of mankind was not determined by class struggles but by struggles for the distribution of social and political functions within a society. It was not a dialectical process, but an evolutionary process determined by objective and subjective factors. Objective factors were the gradual alignments of the various interest groups in a society arising from the fact that they were driven by insight into the nature and needs of society, and those would increasingly satisfy individual needs. Subjective factors were the conscious political actions of politicians in the interests of higher development, something that would be triggered by the social movement of the proletariat – as a form of development and struggle of the new humanism – because all other social groups would have to give up part of their privileges.

For Liebknecht the evolutionary process included not only continuing education but also cultural and social setbacks. The revolution would be only one particularly intense stage within the evolutionary process. Liebknecht's utopian and vague goal of a new humanism had no appeal to the masses during the November Revolution.

Historian Klaus Gietinger did not think that Liebknecht was a Marxist. It was not entirely clear to him whether Liebknecht read Marx himself or learned about him second hand. Gietinger calls Liebknecht's work, which remained fragmentary, "anti-Marx".

== Memorials ==
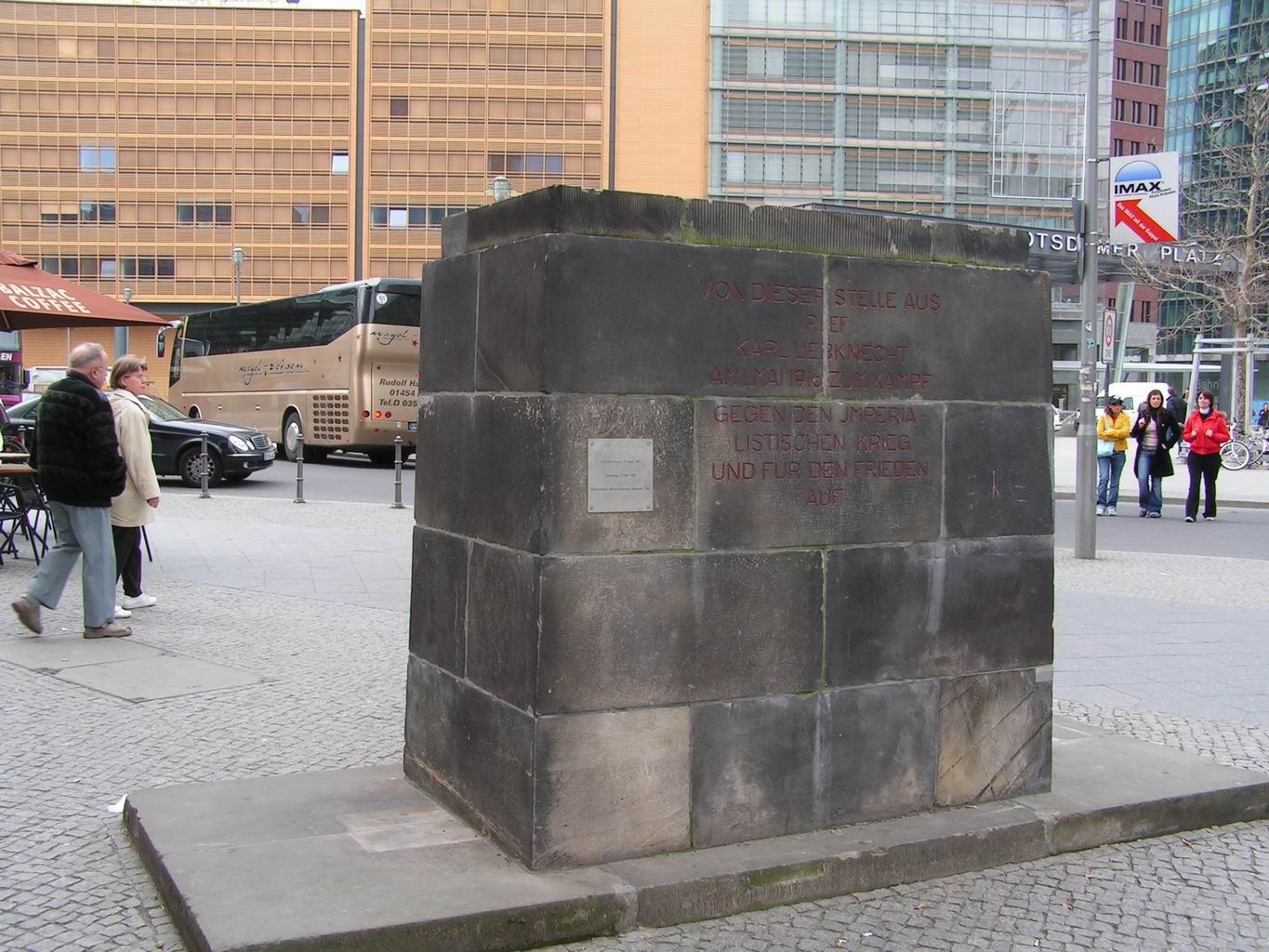
The cornerstone for the unfinished Liebknecht memorial in Berlin

The annual Liebknecht-Luxemburg commemorations in Berlin marking the anniversary of their murders on the second Sunday in January are attended by a wide range of left-leaning groups, parties and individuals.

At the site of the 1916 antiwar demonstration, Friedrich Ebert Jr., Lord Mayor of Greater Berlin (East) and member of the Politburo of the Socialist Unity Party of Germany (East German Communist Party), unveiled the cornerstone of a monument to Karl Liebknecht on 13 August 1951, the 80th anniversary of his birth. The tribute took place within the framework of the Third World-Festival of Youth and Students and was part of a campaign against the rearmament of the Federal Republic of Germany (West Germany). But the memorial on Potsdamer Platz was not completed before the erection of the Berlin Wall.

The sealing off of the sector border to West Berlin began on 13 August 1961. The memorial cornerstone stood in the border strip at the forward wall until the reunification of Germany in 1990. With planning for the new Potsdamer Platz, the memorial was removed and put into storage in 1995. In 2002 the district council of Berlin's Mitte district advocated for the pedestal's reinstallation as a document of the city's history and of how Germany's socialist and anti-militarist traditions were dealt with.

In the Soviet Union there was a Karl Liebknecht School for German emigrant children in Moscow. The Russian warship Karl Liebknecht bore his name, as did several places in Russia. Karlo-Libknekhtovsk in Soviet Ukraine was also named after him.

In East Germany, Liebknecht was honored as a "mastermind of socialism". This led to the erection of numerous monuments in his honor as well as the naming of streets and schools after him. Some of these were renamed after the reunification of Germany in 1990, while others retained their names.
