= November Revolution Monument =

Memorial in Berlin, Germany

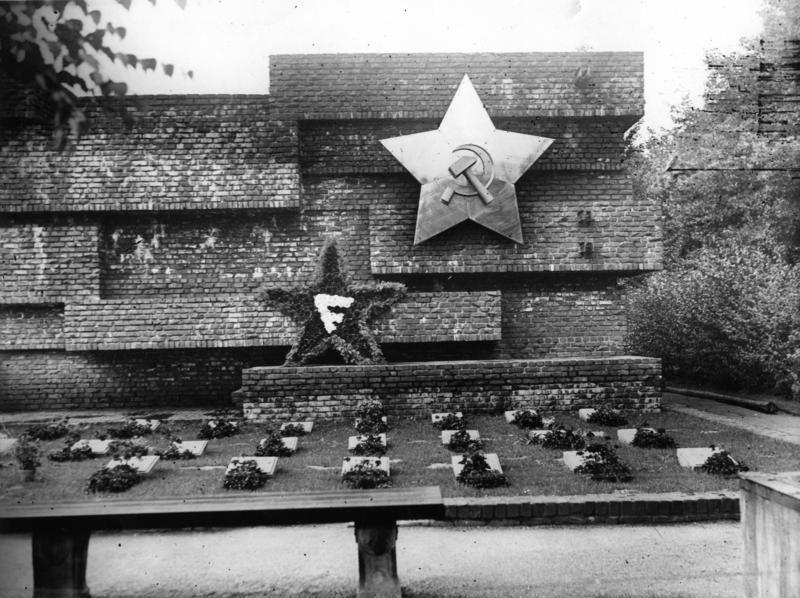
Monument for Karl Liebknecht and Rosa Luxemburg, Berlin-Friedrichsfelde 1926

The November Revolution Monument was a memorial erected in 1926 at the Friedrichsfelde Central Cemetery in Berlin, in memory of the KPD leaders Karl Liebknecht and Rosa Luxemburg and of other militants, who were murdered in 1919 and 1920 during the repression of the leftist riots through paramilitary troops loyal to the government. The building was demolished by the Nazis in 1935 to its foundations and was not restored after the end of the Second World War.

== First concept ==
A first concrete project for the monument seems to have emerged during the 10th congress of the Communist Party (KPD), on 12 July 1925. The KPD party secretary Wilhelm Pieck so described this first project to his party comrades: "The drawings and a sculpture on display here illustrate the project for a monument to the fallen heroes of the proletarian revolution. It has to be placed in Friedrichsfelde, where the victims of the SPD-led counterrevolution already lie. Among them you can find the ones who were killed by treason like Liebknecht, Luxemburg, Jogisches such as the ones who were killed during the fightings of January and March 1919 or during the factory protests of 1920.Thanks to the effort of a friend of us - an artist - we could obtain a work of art: It was shaped by the French sculptor Rodin and it is called " indignation".This sculpture will stand in front of the central nucleus of the monument: a wall. This wall should remember of the wall of the "federates" in Paris, in front of which the victims of the bourgeoise repression against the Commune´s insurrection of 1871 were buried.This idea of the wall must be put in relationship also with the Kremlin wall in Moscow, where the heroes of the Russian revolution lie beside Lenin. In this way the central monument dedicated to all fallen revolutionaries will be erected in Berlin thanks to the effort of the whole German proletariat." For unknown reasons this project never materialised and also the original drawings went lost.

== Definitive project ==
The author of the definitive actually built project for the monument was the architect Mies van der Rohe. Some day during 1925 the advisor for artistic matters of the KPD Eduard Fuchs invited the architect for dinner in order to discuss about plans related to his own house extension. Suddenly the discussion switched to the Monument project. Mies van der Rohe referred some years later about this conversation: "Fuchs said me, he wanted to show me something: It was the photo of a model for an imposing stone monument with doric columns and medallions dedicated to Luxembourg and Liebknecht. As I saw it, I began to laugh and I said him that this would have been a pretty monument for a banker. He remained quite dazzled and confused by my sentence. In fact he called me the day after and said me that he wanted to know, which would be my own proposal. I told him that - since the most part of these people had been shot in front of a wall - my idea was to build a wall of bricks. He was quite surprised but he told me that he would have been glad to see a visualisation of my concept. Some days later I showed him a sketch which represented the monument in a way which nearly corresponds to the structure as it was later built. However he still remained very skeptical and he had probably many difficulties to persuade his colleagues."

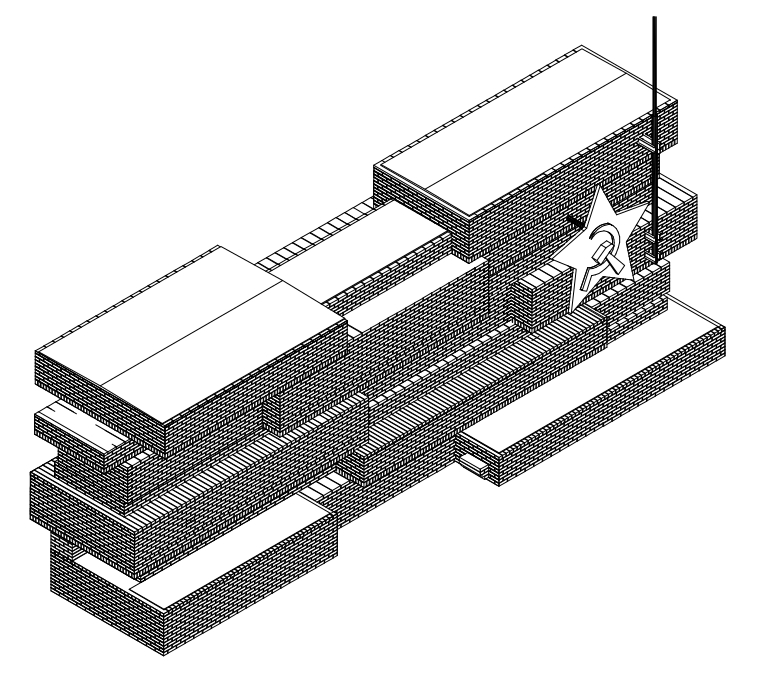
Isometric graphical reconstruction of the Monument

The project process was apparently quite short. In fact the monument - which was financed mainly through the selling of postcards - was presented to the public already in June 1926 and was officially inaugurated on 11 July of the same year with an inaugural speech by party secretary Wilhem Pieck. The planned inscription "Ich war, ich bin, ich werde sein" (I was, I am, I will be) was never definitely installed on the monument. If it can be seen in some photos, it is only due to photomontages or temporary installations.

== Demolition ==
In February 1933 the monument was heavily damaged by members of the SA and the star was removed to be displayed as a symbol of the victory over the Bolshevist. In the following months the monument was used as a trap in order to capture communist militants. Finally at the end of 1934 the Nazis decided to get rid of the artefact, which was demolished during the following year. Also the graves of Liebknecht, Luxembourg and the other militants were soon removed.

== Reconstruction attempts ==
After World War Two there were several attempts to rebuild the monument at various locations in East Berlin and also in West Berlin but none of them ever materialised. As interim solutions for the manifestations of 15 January 1946 and 1947 the former Nazi camps prisoner Ludwig Schulze-Iburg erected temporary cardboard reconstructions on the site of the disappeared monument. These temporary reconstructions were very simplified versions of the original monument with fewer cantilevered elements and they were of course removed shortly afterwards.

In 1974 - in the context of a "plan for the re-shaping of the monuments of the workers´movement", the GDR government decided to erect a monument to Ernst Thälmann - the historical leader of the KPD during the twenties who had been later assassinated by the Nazis in Buchenwald's concentration lager. The architect Günther Stahn was commissioned to draw a design for it. The brief called for the reconstruction either of the disappeared "Bauakademie" (construction academy) by Schinkel and of the original November revolution monument, integrated by a statue of Ernst Thällmann. Such a layout was allusive to the historical picture, where Ernst Thälmann is portrayed while speaking to the crowd in front of Liebknecht and Luxemburg's graves with the monument behind. This ensemble had to be integrated by a monument to SED leaders Pieck and Otto Grotewohl which had to be placed in front of the Party central committee's building.

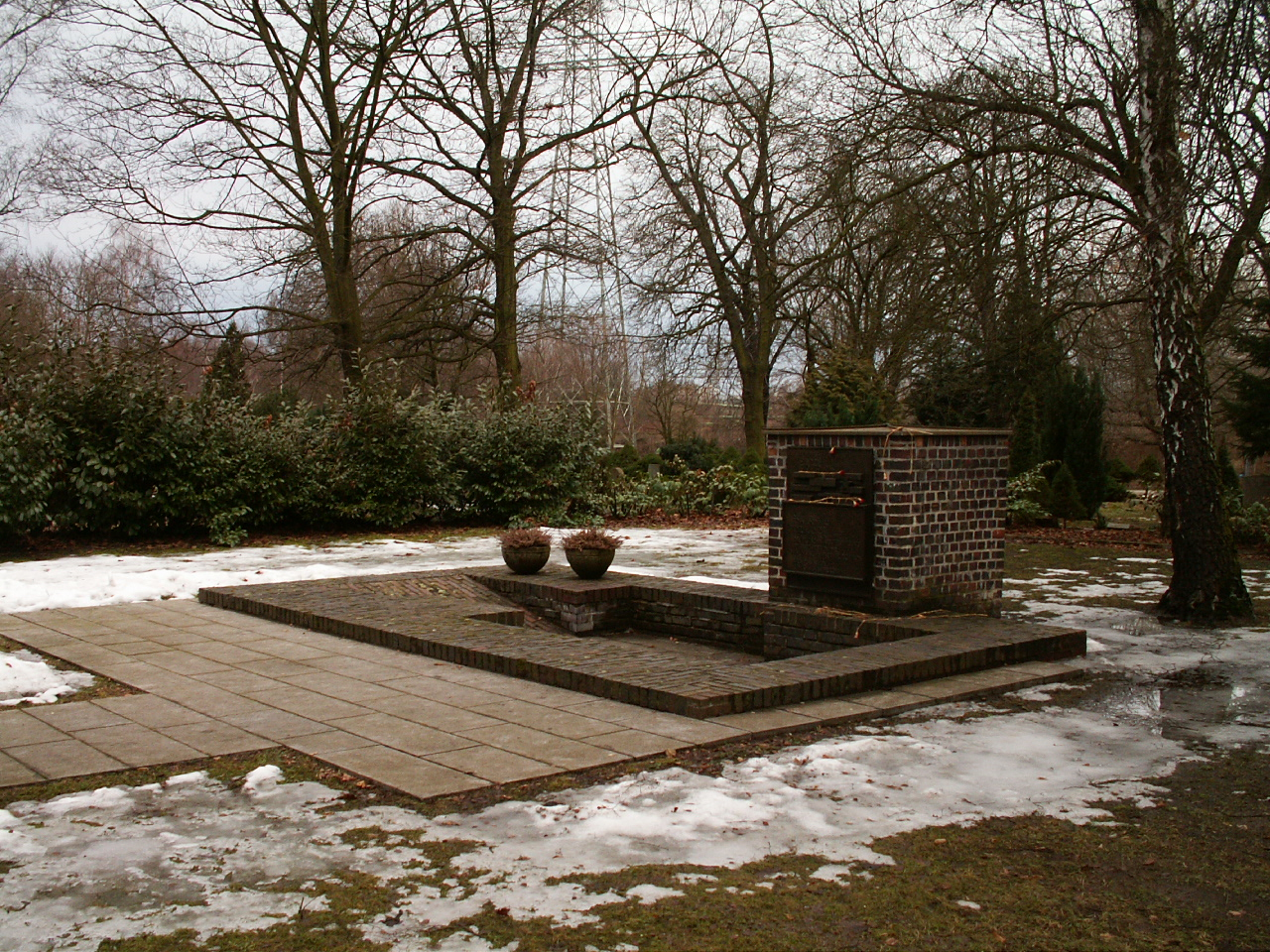
Günther Stahn's small "Monument to the Monument" of 1983

In 1979 the project for a "social center" in the Berlin district of Prenzlauer Berg was approved. It had to be erected at the place of the former gasometer at the corner between Dimitroffstrasse and Greifswalder Strasse. It had to be integrated by the seat of the local metropolitan borough and by a multi-use hall. Also in this case Stahn office was in charge with the design. Stahn himself proposed to set the monument in the middle of the park. It had to be placed at the center of a stone paved square. The contrast between the horizontality of the square and the monument had to enhance the visual impact of the latter in a way, which was clearly reminiscent of Mies´ New National Gallery in West Berlin. However the SED politicians decided to change radically the brief and to erect a monument to Thälmann instead .

The still existing "monument to the monument" is a small commemorative artefact erected in May 1983 through a spontaneous self-financed initiative by Günther Stahn and sculptor Gerhard Thieme in order to mark the exact place, where once Mies´monument stood. The original idea to build an exact replica of the original monument had in fact been rejected by the cemetery direction due to its excessive size.

Also in West Germany the memory of the monument lived on. On the occasion of the 50th birthday of Karl Liebknecht and Rosa Luxemburg (15 January 1969) architecture students and young architects of the group "Aktion 507 Diagnose" decided to rebuild the monument in West Berlin in collaboration with the members of the "Luxemburg-Liebknecht-Gesellschaft" (Luxemburg-Liebknecht-society).This happened nearly in coincidence with the inauguration of Mies´ Neue Nationalgalerie (New National Gallery) also in Berlin. In November 1968 the Luxemburg-Liebknecht-society applied for a building permission to the borough of Berlin-Tiergarten, but the request was rejected in few days. Albeit this the activists decided to stage a symbolic groundbreaking, which took place in front of the Eden hotel on 15 January 1969. It was removed by the police some days later.

== Current debate ==
In 2003 the architect Ulrich Findeisen from Cologne proposed to rebuild the monument using a private financing. This proposal was followed by a vivid debate about this issue. It led to a public discussion, which took place the following year at the former house Lemke, a house which had been designed by Mies in the Berliner district of Berlin-Obersee in 1932 and hosts today the seat of a cultural association named "Mies van der Rohe´s Haus". However Findeisen's proposal was decisively opposed by the most historians and critics. Information gaps regarding shape and constructive characters of the original monument, doubts about the legitimacy of an eventual reconstruction by the point of view of the modern heritage conservation theories and the delicate issue of the meaning of such a building nowadays, have been recorded as main critical factors in this sense. The administrators of the borough of Berlin-Lichtenberg - in charge for the place where the monument once stand - were particularly skeptical. Albeit this general skepticism, many scholars declared that it would be interesting to get some kind of artistic installation on the historical place. In June 2019 however Wita Noack, the director of the Mies van der Rohe House, spoke out for the reconstruction of the monument. Not only would be the district of Berlin-Lichtenberg be enriched in terms of tourist attractions, but it would also have a place to deal with its troubled history." A good time would be the 100th anniversary of the unveiling of the monument," said Noack.

== Links ==
Exhibition in Berlin-Lichtenberg: https://www.berlin.de/ba-lichtenberg/aktuelles/pressemitteilungen/2013/pressemitteilung.305893.php

Boon on the November Revolution Monument l

Article in "Neues Deutschland": https://www.neues-deutschland.de/artikel/1120834.mies-van-der-rohes-monument-und-architekturikone.html
