= Thüringer Volkszeitung =

German communist newspaper

Thüringer Volkszeitung ('Thuringia People's Newspaper') was a communist newspaper published from Erfurt 1945–1946. It was the organ of the Communist Party of Germany in Thuringia. The paper was published thrice weekly in August 1945. It then became a daily newspaper, published from September 2, 1945 to April 6, 1945. It merged with Tribüne, forming the newspaper Thüringer Volk.
