= Hugo Haase =

German politician, jurist and pacifist

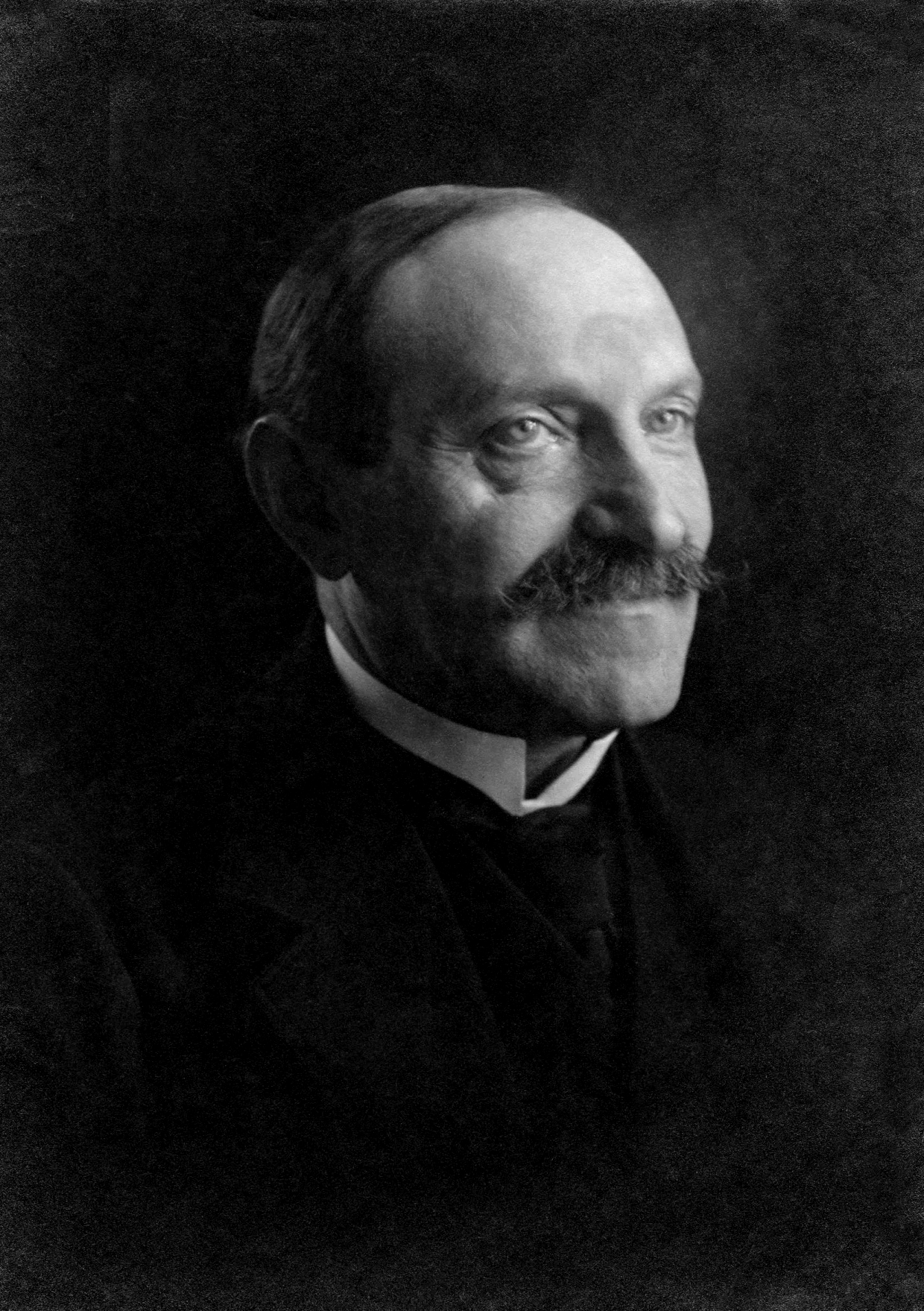
- Haase c. 1916

Co-Chairman of the Council of the People's Deputies
- In office 10 November 1918 – 29 December 1918 Serving with Friedrich Ebert
- Preceded by: Max von Baden (as Chancellor)
- Succeeded by: Philipp Scheidemann

Leader of the Independent Social Democratic Party
- In office 6 April 1917 – 7 November 1919
- Serving with: Georg Ledebour (1917–1919); Arthur Crispien (1919–1922)
- Preceded by: Position established
- Succeeded by: Ernst Däumig

Leader of the Social Democratic Party
- In office 16 September 1911 – 25 March 1916
- Serving with: August Bebel (1892–1913); Friedrich Ebert (1913–1919)
- Preceded by: Paul Singer
- Succeeded by: Philipp Scheidemann

Member of the National Assembly for Berlin
- In office 6 February 1919 – 7 November 1919
- Preceded by: Constituency established
- Succeeded by: Richard Herbst

Member of the Reichstag for Königsberg 3
- In office 12 January 1912 – 9 November 1918
- Preceded by: Robert Gyßling
- Succeeded by: Constituency abolished
- In office 14 June 1897 – 24 January 1907
- Preceded by: Carl Schultze
- Succeeded by: Robert Gyßling

Personal details
- Born: 29 September 1863 Allenstein, Province of Prussia, Kingdom of Prussia
- Died: 7 November 1919 (aged 56) Berlin, Weimar Republic
- Cause of death: Blood poisoning from a gunshot wound
- Party: SPD (1887–1916); USPD (1917–1919)
- Other political affiliations: SAG (1915–1917)
- Spouse: Thea Lichtenstein
- Children: Ernst Haase, Hilde Haase, Gertrude Dresel
- Education: University of Königsberg

Hugo Haase (29 September 1863 – 7 November 1919) was a German socialist politician, jurist and pacifist. With Friedrich Ebert, he co-chaired the Council of the People's Deputies during the German Revolution of 1918–19.

== Early life ==
Hugo Haase was born on 29 September 1863 in Allenstein, East Prussia, Germany (now Olsztyn, Poland), the son of Jewish shoemaker and small businessman, Nathan Haase, and his wife Pauline (née Anker).

After attending the Gymnasium at Rastenburg, Haase studied law in Königsberg (now Kaliningrad, Russia), joined the Social Democratic Party of Germany (SPD) in 1887 and the next year established himself as a lawyer. He was the first socialist lawyer in East Prussia and took on clients mainly from the lower classes (workers, peasants), journalists and socialist functionaries. In 1894, Haase became the first Social Democrat in the municipal parliament (Stadtverordnetenversammlung) of Königsberg. In 1897, he was elected to the Reichstag in a by-election.

In multiple legal cases, he defended Social Democrats against various politically motivated charges. High-profile cases that made him known throughout the country included the so-called Königsberger Geheimbundprozeß in 1904, in which he achieved acquittals for several politicians including the later Minister President of Prussia, Otto Braun. In 1907, Haase was counsel for Karl Liebknecht (SPD) who had been charged with high treason for publishing his pamphlet Militarismus und Antimilitarismus.

Haase belonged to the so-called "revisionist" wing of the party, which in contrast to the Marxists, supported gradual reforms and no longer saw the best path to social and political change in revolution. In 1911, he became SPD chairman along with August Bebel, in 1912 Haase was reelected to the Reichstag and, together with Philipp Scheidemann, became chairman of the SPD Reichstag group. After Bebel's death in 1913, Haase and Friedrich Ebert were chosen as the party chairmen. However, he remained active as a lawyer (now with an office in Berlin). By contrast with Ebert, Bebel and Scheidemann, Haase was not a home-grown party functionary but a radical intellectual.

== Great War and founding of the USPD ==
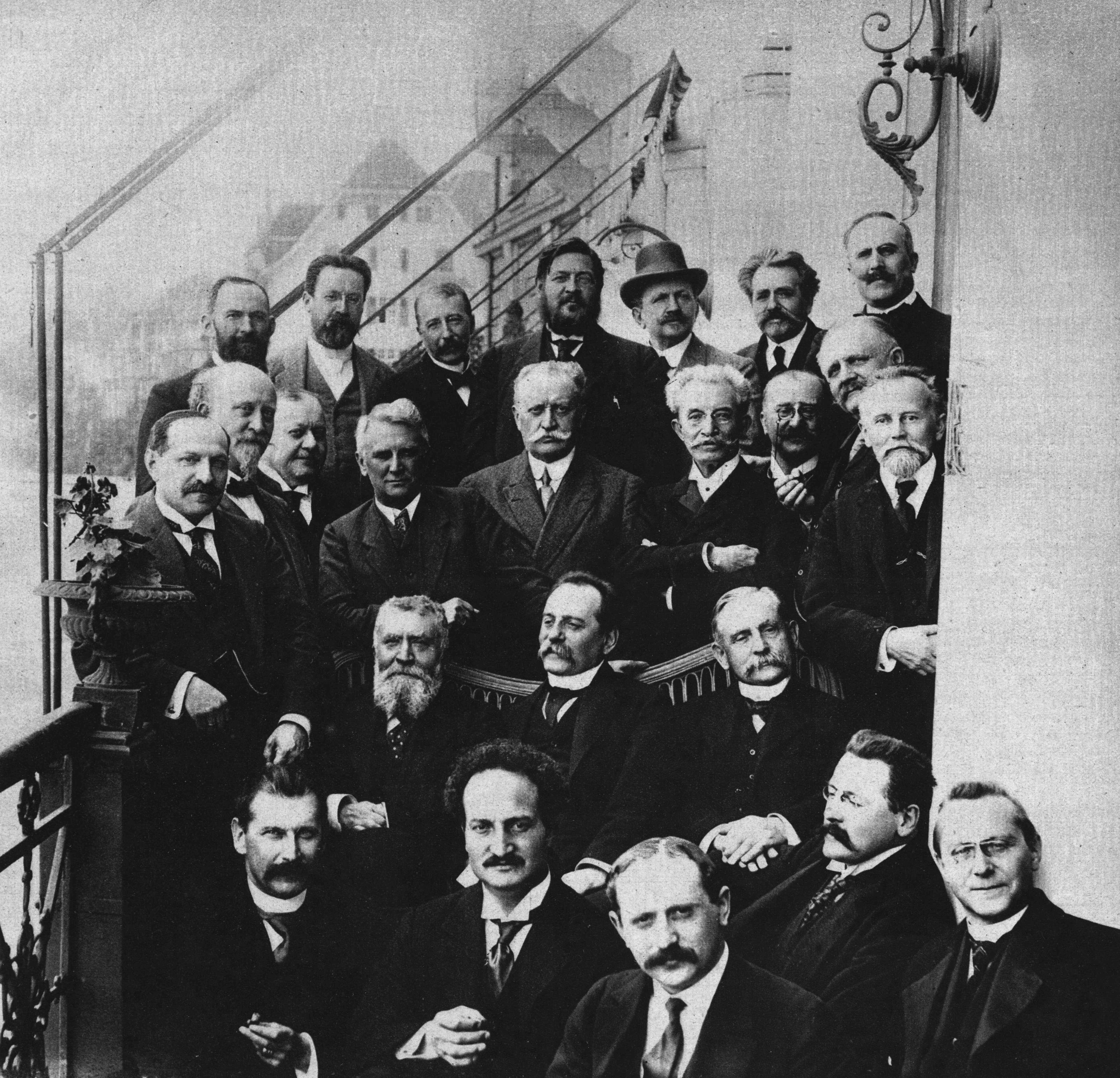
Haase (third row, far left) among German and French Social Democrats at the Hotel Les Trois Rois in Basel, Switzerland, June 21, 1914

In July 1914, Haase organized anti-war rallies for the SPD. In the decisive meeting of the SPD delegates on 3 August, only Haase and 13 others refused to support the war loans needed to finance Germany's entry into World War I. Bowing to party discipline, Haase then voted for the loans in the Reichstag and, as chairman, had to defend the SPD vote in the session of 4 August. Haase read the party's statement that "we will not abandon the Fatherland in the hour of danger". The SPD's support of war loans made the Burgfrieden policy possible.

After the collapse of Germany's hopes for a quick victory at the end of 1914, Haase became more and more vocal against the policies of the main SPD faction. He was forced to resign as faction leader in 1915. That June, he signed the manifesto Gebot der Stunde which openly opposed the war aims of the government. In March 1916, Haase and 18 other SPD delegates voted against the government's emergency budget. He was forced to resign as party chairman of the SPD. He then founded and led the Socialist Working Group (Sozialistische Arbeitsgemeinschaft, SAG). In April 1917, Haase became chairman of the newly founded Independent Social Democratic Party of Germany (USPD), which split from the so-called "Majority Social Democrats" group and advocated immediate peace negotiations.

== German revolution, Council of the People's Deputies and 1919 ==
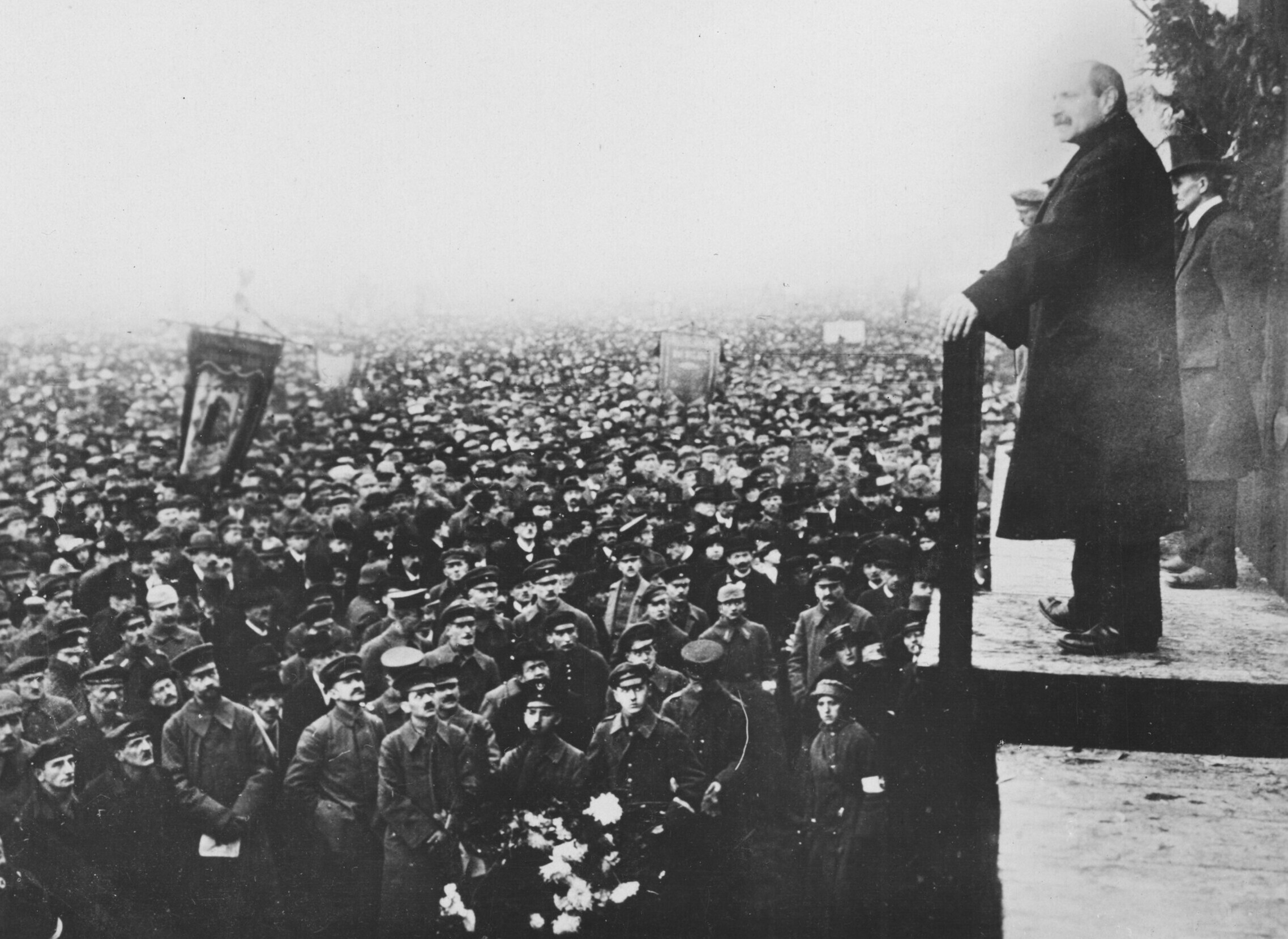
Haase speaking at a funeral for those killed in the revolution, Tempelhofer Feld, November 1918

In the course of the German Revolution in November 1918, along with the majority Social Democrats' leader Ebert, Haase became joint chairman of the provisional government, the Council of the People's Deputies. Haase thus distanced himself from those in the USPD who were seeking to establish a dictatorship of the proletariat through powerful soldiers' and workers' councils.

After the Council led by Ebert ordered the bloody suppression of the revolutionary Volksmarinedivision during Christmas 1918, Haase and the two other USPD representatives Wilhelm Dittmann and Emil Barth left the government on 29 December in protest.

Even then, Haase supported continued cooperation with the SPD and was in favour of elections to the Weimar National Assembly—both views not universally popular in his party where many preferred a council-based republic. After the founding of the Kommunistische Partei Deutschlands (KPD) in late 1918/early 1919, Haase argued in favour of a reunification between USPD and majority SPD.

Notwithstanding this position, many in the majority SPD loathed him. This was mainly due to the fact that the USPD's very existence provided a political alternative to the left of the SPD, which was particularly attractive to many workers. In order to retain the support of the revolutionary masses, the SPD leadership thus was forced to steer a more leftist course than they would otherwise have chosen if left to their own devices. It also made their job of feeding the population, keeping up law and order and decommissioning the huge war-time army whilst replacing the Empire with a republic harder by threatening to antagonize the mostly conservative civil service and, in particular, the leadership of the military.

The Haase-led USPD achieved 7% of the vote for the National Assembly on 19 January 1919.

== Death ==
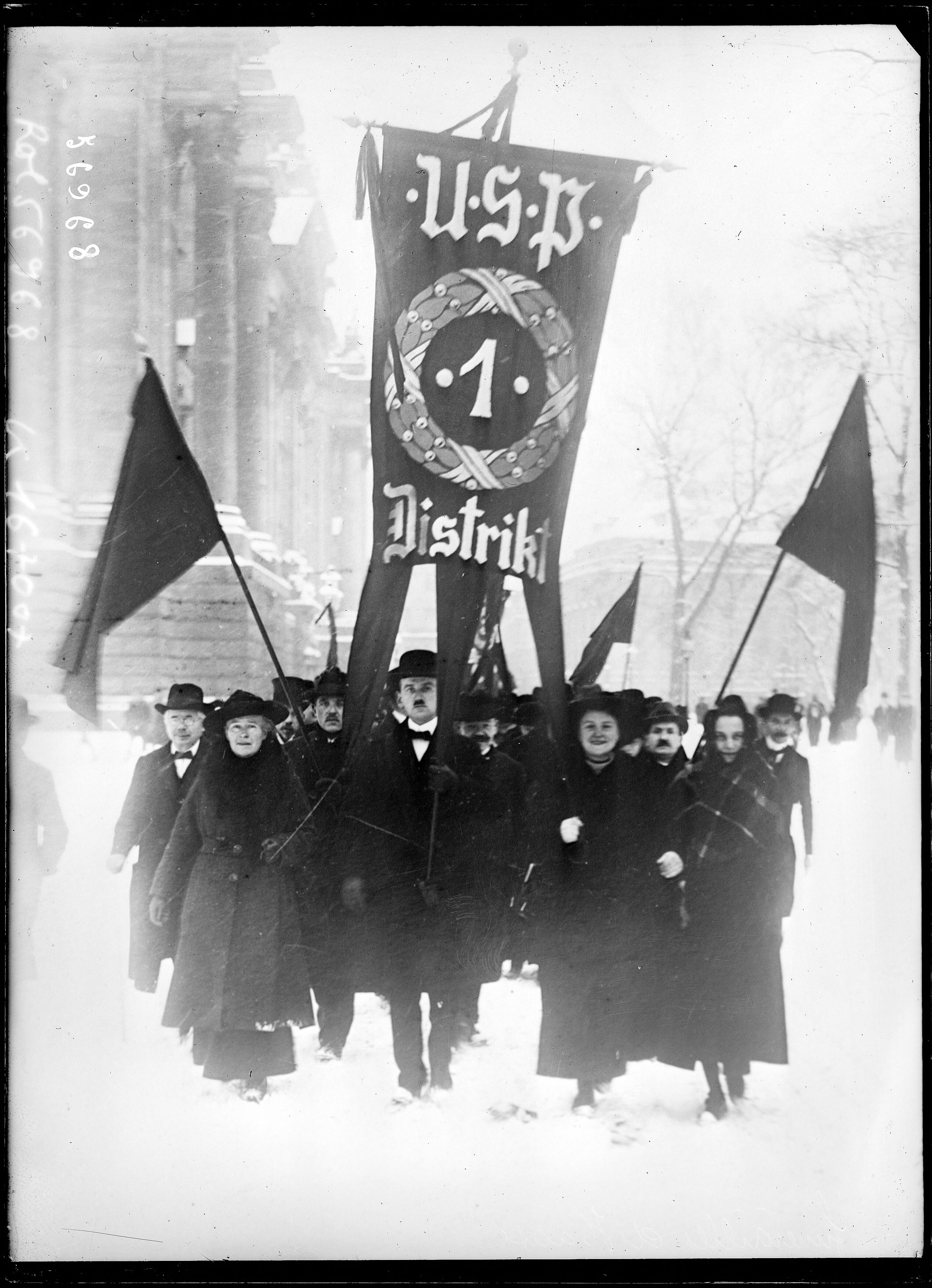
Haase's funeral procession, 1919

On 8 October 1919, immediately prior to his death Haase was walking into the Reichstag with the intention of exposing an alliance between Ebert and Rüdiger Von der Goltz, a Freikorps general active in the Baltic. He was shot by Johann Voss as he entered the building. Voss was declared insane within two days and committed to a mental asylum. Some left wing activists suggested that he was a paid assassin. Haase was severely injured and died on 7 November. Haase is commemorated at the Memorial to the Socialists (German: Gedenkstätte der Sozialisten) in the Friedrichsfelde Central Cemetery, Berlin.

Hugo Haase had been married to Thea (née Lichtenstein), with whom he had a son Ernest, daughter Gertrude, and daughter Hilde.

== See also ==
- List of peace activists
