= Wilhelm Dittmann =

German socialist politician

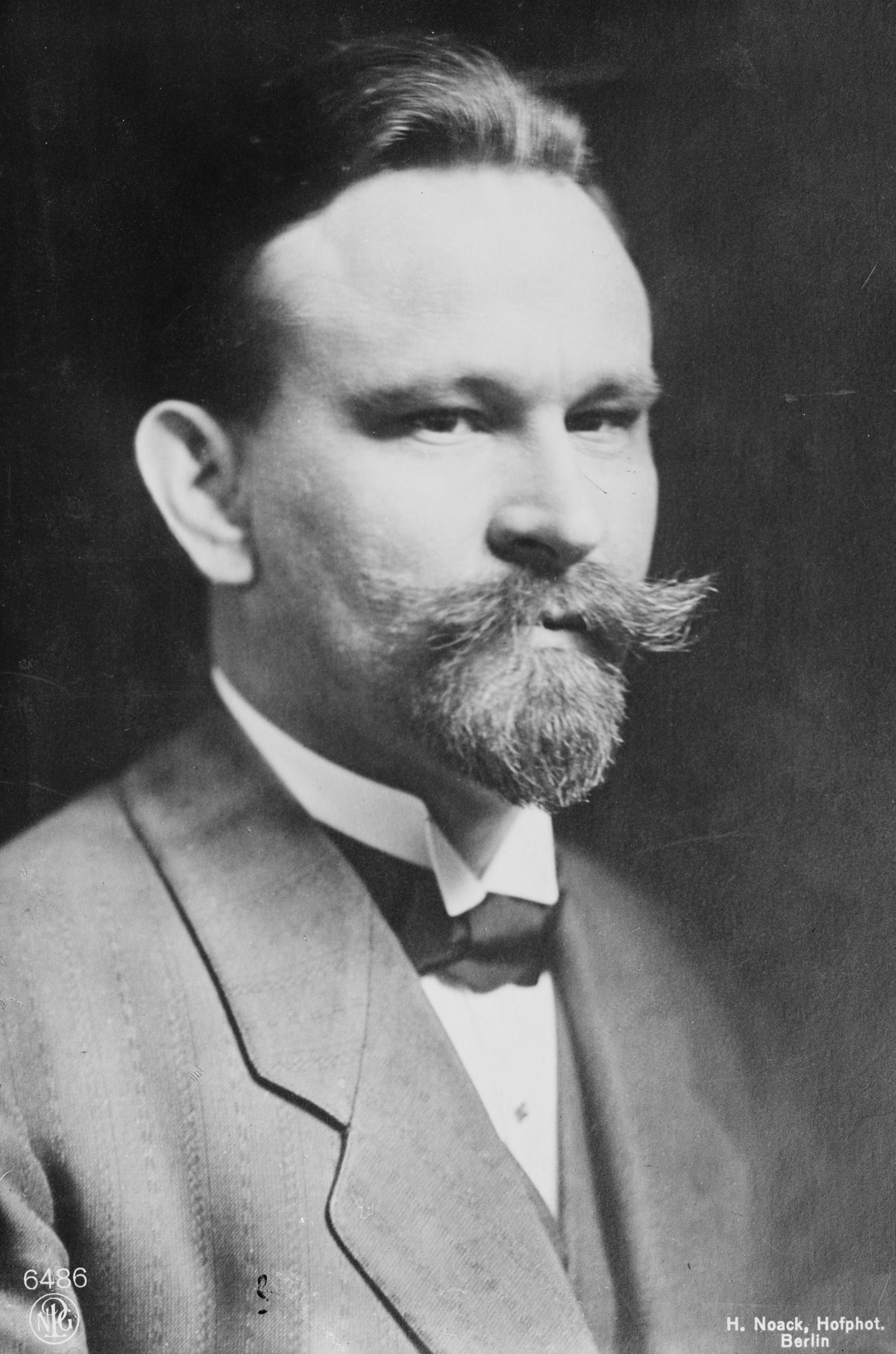
- Dittmann c. 1915–1918

Member of the Reichstag (Weimar Republic)
- In office 1920–1933

Member of the National Assembly
- In office 1919–1920

Member of the Council of the People's Deputies
- In office 10 November 1918 – 29 December 1918

Member of the Reichstag (German Empire)
- In office 1894–1918
- Constituency: Remscheid-Lennep-Mettmann

Personal details
- Born: 1 November 1874 Eutin, Duchy of Oldenburg, German Empire
- Died: 7 August 1954 (aged 79) Bonn, West Germany
- Party: SPD (1894–1917, 1922–1933); USPD (1917–1922)
- Other political affiliations: SAG (1915–1917)
- Occupation: Politician; Carpenter

Wilhelm Friedrick Karl Dittmann (1 November 1874 – 7 August 1954), was a German Social Democratic politician who was a founding member of the Independent Social Democratic Party of Germany (USPD) and on its Central Committee from 1917 to 1922, after which he returned to the Social Democrats. He was a member of the imperial Reichstag (1912–1918), of the Council of the People's Deputies (1918), the Weimar National Assembly (1919–1920) and the Reichstag of the Weimar Republic (1920–1933). After the Nazi Party came to power he went into exile and returned to Germany in 1951.

== Life ==
Dittmann was born in Eutin in the Duchy of Oldenburg where he attended primary school. He completed an apprenticeship as a carpenter in 1894 and worked in the profession for five years. In 1894, he joined the Social Democratic Party of Germany (SPD) and the Woodworkers' Association. Beginning in 1899, Dittmann worked as an editor for party newspapers in Bremerhaven and Solingen. In 1904, he took up a position as party secretary in Frankfurt am Main, where he also became a city councillor in 1907. He returned to Solingen in 1912 where he won a seat in the Reichstag of the German Empire in 1912.

After having initially supported loans to finance World War I, he voted against them on 21 December 1915 because he believed that Germany was to blame for starting the war. As a result, he was expelled from the SPD Reichstag contingent in March 1916. He then founded the Social Democratic Working Group with Hugo Haase and Georg Ledebour. In April 1917, he was a founding member of the Independent Social Democratic Party (USPD), a more leftist and anti-war breakaway from the SPD. On 5 February 1918, he was found guilty of attempted treason by a military court for his involvement in the Berlin munitions workers' strike and sentenced to five years in prison. After Germany began to seek a ceasefire to end the war, he was released on 15 October 1918 as part of the change of course in domestic politics under Chancellor Max von Baden.

During the first weeks of the German Revolution of 1918–1919, Dittman was a member for the USPD on the Council of the People's Deputies, the six-man body that functioned as Germany's revolutionary government beginning on 10 November 1918. His responsibilities on the Council were for transportation and the demobilisation of soldiers returning from the front. He and the other USPD members of the Council resigned on 29 December 1918 due to a disagreement with the SPD following the 1918 Christmas crisis.

In 1919, he was elected to the Weimar National Assembly, the interim parliament that also drafted the Weimar Constitution, then in 1920 to the first Reichstag of the Weimar Republic. Also in 1920, Dittmann took part in the Second World Congress of the Communist International in Petrograd (Saint Petersburg), Russia on behalf of the USPD. He opposed an affiliation of the USPD with the Communist International and a unification with the Communist Party of Germany (KPD), contrary to the vote at the USPD party congress in Halle.

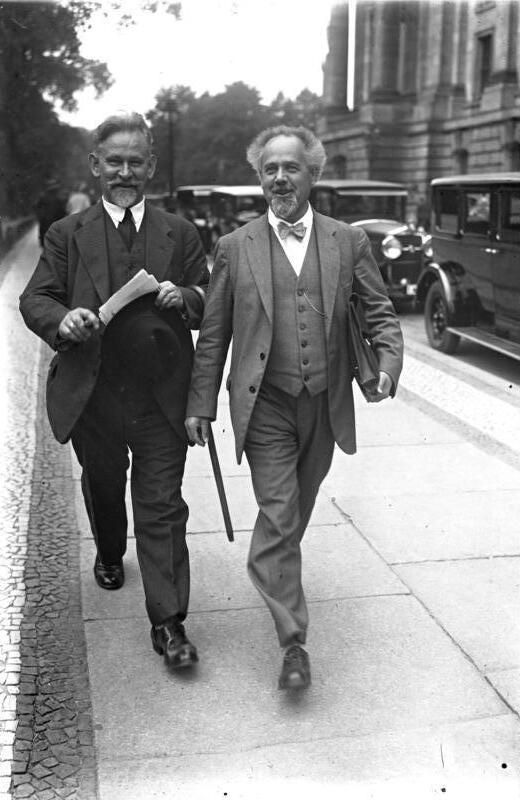
Wilhelm Dittmann (left) and Arthur Crispien, also a leader in the SPD and USPD, in 1930

After the majority of the USPD's members joined the KPD in 1920, Dittmann remained a leading member of the remaining USPD and worked towards a reunification with the SPD, which took place in 1922. In the autumn of 1922, Dittmann joined the executive committee of the SPD as secretary and became executive chairman of the Social Democratic Reichstag party contingent, both of which offices he held until 1933. He was also one of the vice-presidents of the Reichstag from 1920 to 1925 and a city councillor in Berlin from 1921 to 1925.

On 22 and 23 January 1926, Dittmann gave a six-hour speech to the Reichstag's parliamentary committee of enquiry into the stab-in-the-back myth, which he chaired. The myth was the claim by right-wing parties and nationalist groups that the German army had not been defeated militarily in the field but had been stabbed in the back by the socialists and communists who supported the German Revolution.

Shortly after the Nazi Party came to power, in February 1933, Dittmann fled to Austria on the recommendation of the party executive when it was rumoured that the Nazis intended to accuse him of being a "November criminal" – i.e. one of those who had stabbed the army in the back. He later moved to Switzerland where he wrote Wie alles kam ("How it All Came About"), a history of the years 1914 to 1933 which remained unpublished. He returned to West Germany in 1951 and worked in the SPD archive in Bonn until his death.

Dittmann's memoirs, written in Switzerland between 1939 and 1947 and published in 1995, are a first-rate autobiographical source on the history of the German labour movement, particularly during the First World War, the November Revolution and the first years of the Weimar Republic.
