= Burgfriedenspolitik =

Political truce in WWI Germany

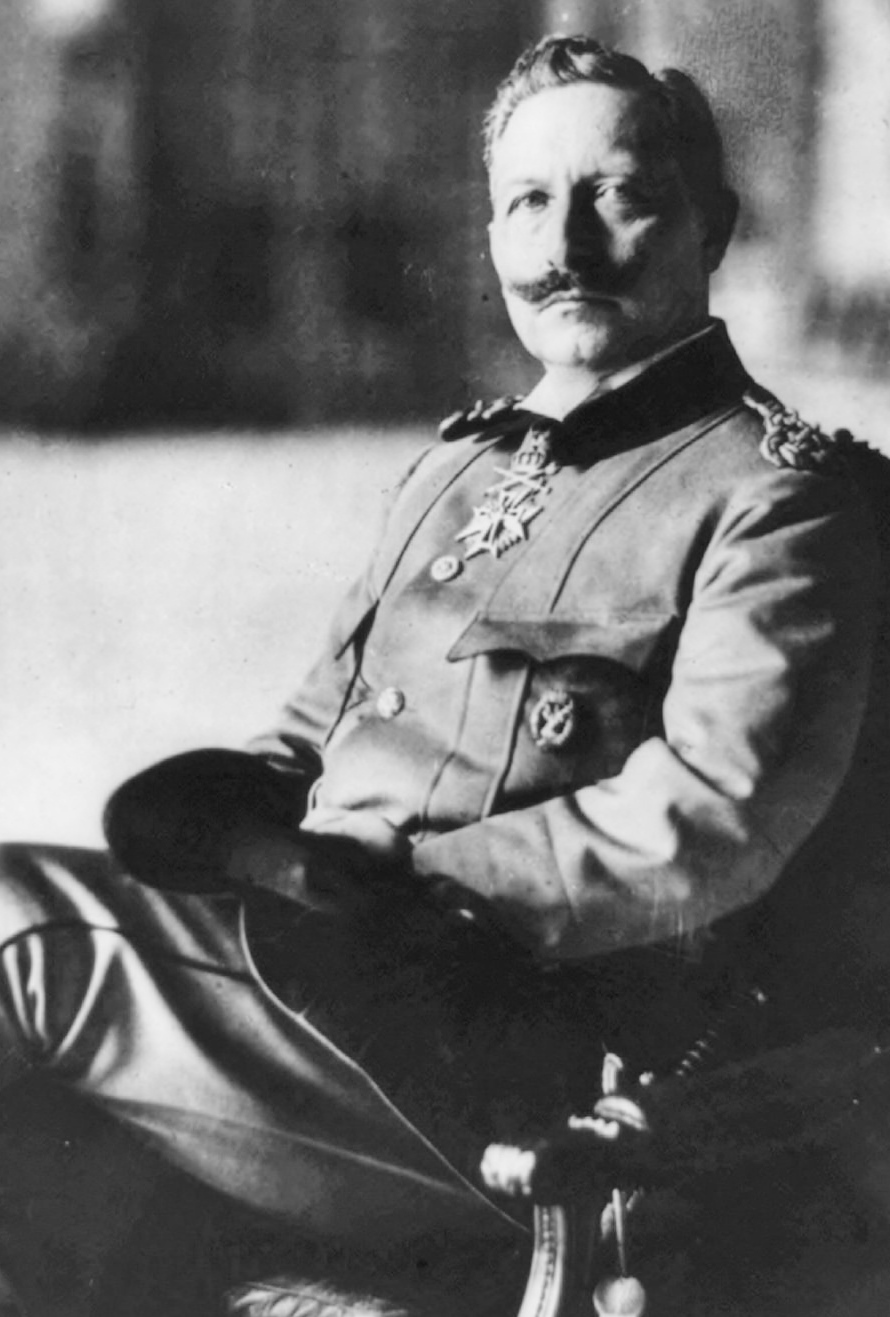
Emperor Wilhelm II in 1915. His speeches stating that he no longer knew any parties set the tone for the Burgfrieden.

The Burgfriedenspolitik (German: [ˈbʊʁkfʁiːdn̩s.poliˌtiːk], lit. 'castle peace policy') was a political truce between the German Empire's parliamentary parties during World War I. They agreed not to criticise the government's handling of the war, to keep their disagreements out of public view and to postpone elections until after the end of the war. In addition, three major associations of trade unions promised not to strike. The informal agreement was seen as proof of Germany's national unity in waging what was presented by the imperial leadership as a defensive war.

Even though the Social Democratic Party of Germany (SPD) had adopted the Second International's policy of anti-militarism, it joined the rest of the Reichstag in supporting the declaration of war in the belief that Germany was defending itself against the Russian Empire. Emperor Wilhelm II and the other parliamentary parties enthusiastically welcomed the SPD's unanimous vote in favor of war credits on 4 August 1914. The vote marked the start of the Burgfrieden.

The political truce was short-lived. By mid-1915, discussions about the war began to center around what were often annexationist war goals. The right saw the Burgfrieden as a sign of support for the authoritarian state while the left expected their sacrifices to be rewarded by social changes after the end of the war. Disagreements within the SPD led to a permanent split within the party when anti-war members formed their own more leftist party, the Independent Social Democrats (USPD), in 1917.

The term Burgfrieden came into use more or less spontaneously. The situation in 1914 was seen to mirror the internal peace that by necessity prevailed inside a besieged castle during the Middle Ages.

== Background ==
Before the start of the First World War, many of Europe's social democratic parties adopted a policy of peace and anti-militarism which was formalised at international conferences of the Second International in 1907 and 1912. At the 1907 Social Democratic Party of Germany (SPD) congress, chairman August Bebel nevertheless declared that in the event of an attack on Germany, he would defend the fatherland, adding an explicit reference to an attack by the Russian Empire, which he described as the "enemy of all culture and all oppressed people". Russia under the rule of Tsar Nicholas II was a byword for oppression and reaction for the Social Democrats long before 1914. Karl Marx had called the tsarist empire a hotbed of reaction.

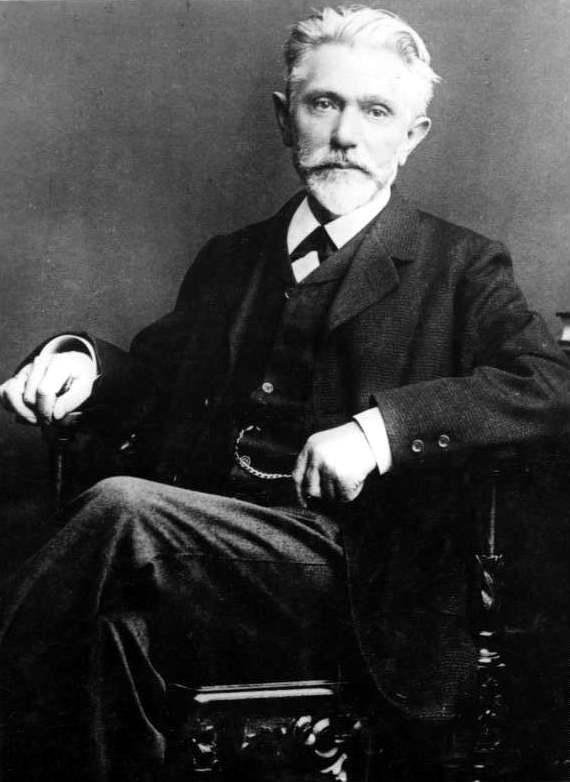
August Bebel, chairman of the SPD from 1892 until his death in 1913. He had made it clear that the party would support a defensive war.

In the weeks leading up to the outbreak of hostilities, the belief that it was a defensive war was critical to ensuring support, especially among Germany's socialists. The danger that they would call strikes or demonstrations during a war was seen as very real. At the end of July 1914, the SPD held mass demonstrations in favour of peace and called for resistance to the impending war. On 25 July, the executive committee published a call for peace in the party newspaper Vorwärts:

Danger is imminent. A world war is threatening! The ruling classes, who enslave, despise and exploit you in peace, want to use you as cannon fodder. Everywhere the ears of those in power need to be ringing with: We don't want war! Down with war! Long live the international brotherhood of nations!

During the July Crisis that led up to the German declaration of war against Russia on 1 August 1914 and against France and Belgium in the following days, the German government was able to successfully portray its decisions as part of a necessary defensive war against Russia, which had declared a general mobilization on 30 July. Even after the German attack on France through neutral Belgium, German chancellor Theobald von Bethmann Hollweg continued to speak of Germany being forced into hostilities by the enemies that surrounded it.

== Beginning of the political truce ==
In his speech from the balcony of the Berlin Palace on 1 August announcing Germany's decision to go to war, Emperor Wilhelm II invoked national unity: "I no longer recognise parties or denominations; today we are all German brothers and only German brothers." On 4 August, the Emperor delivered his speech from the throne in the White Hall of the Palace, to which all Reichstag members had been invited. The SPD contingent alone did not attend because the Emperor would be speaking at the Palace rather than the Reichstag. The Emperor ended his speech with a personal postscript that echoed some of his words from 1 August:

I repeat now that I no longer know any parties. I know only Germans. And in order to testify that you are firmly resolved without distinction of party to stand by my side through danger and death, I call upon the leaders of the different parties in this House to come forward and lay their hands in mine as a pledge.

The leaders who were present came forward and took the pledge, following which the parliamentary members enthusiastically sang "Heil Dir im Siegerkranz" ("Hail to Thee in the Victor's Wreath"), the anthem of the German Empire.

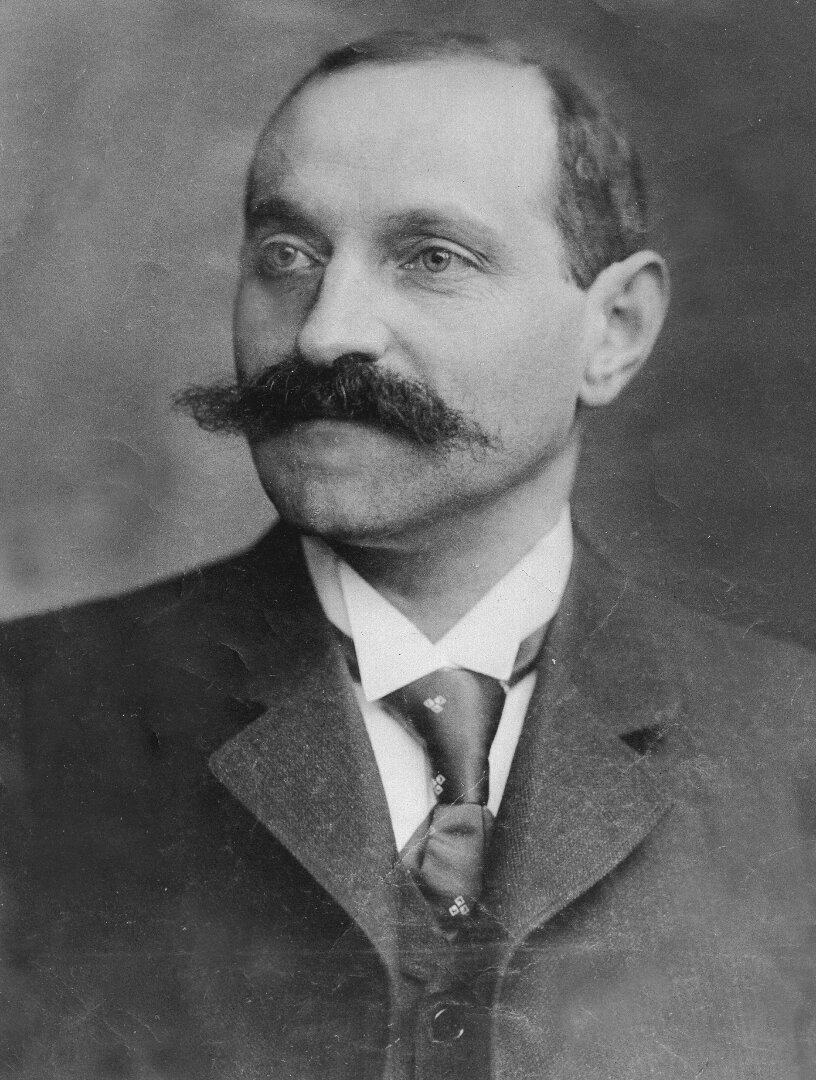
The SPD's co-chairman Hugo Haase in 1915. He later split with the SPD over its policy of Burgfrieden.

The Burgfrieden can be said to have begun with the Reichstag's unanimous vote on 4 August to approve the war credits for five billion marks that the government had requested. On 2 August, the leaders of the SPD in the Reichstag had decided to support war credits by four votes to two. The following day, the SPD's Reichstag membership voted 78 to 14 to accept the credits and then, with 24 no votes, to enforce party discipline, which meant that on 4 August in the full Reichstag, the SPD voted as a bloc in favour. That included Karl Liebknecht, who on 2 December became the first Reichstag member to vote against a request for war credits.

SPD co-chairman Hugo Haase, who had voted in the party caucus against approving the war credits, gave the reasons for the party's approval in front of the Reichstag. He cited imperialism and the arms race as the causes of the war, assigned responsibility to the "promoters of the policy" and emphasised that the SPD had warned against the coming war. He connected the SPD's vote of approval to its positions on a war of defence and Russian tsarism, seeing the liberal future of the people endangered by a victory of "bloodthirsty Russian despotism". He believed that the war was a war of conquest that had been imposed on Germany, and he emphasised the "right of a people to national independence and self-defence" in accordance with the resolutions of the Second International. He expressly reaffirmed the SPD's intention "not to abandon its own fatherland in its hour of danger".

The SPD's yes vote was loudly cheered and seen as especially important because its connection to the socialist Second International and its pacifism had led many to call the socialists "journeymen without a fatherland" (vaterlandslose Gesellen).

The bill for war credits was one of 17 war laws passed in fifteen minutes and signed by the Emperor on 4 August. Those included an enabling act (Ermächtigungsgesetz) which transferred the Reichstag's legislative power to the Bundesrat. The act authorised the Bundesrat, chaired by the chancellor, "to order such legal measures during the period of war as prove necessary to remedy economic damage". The Reichstag nevertheless retained the power of the budget and therefore controlled the funding for the war. Its members, as part of the Burgfrieden, agreed to forego elections, including by-elections, and to keep their disagreements out of public view.

The president of the Reichstag, Dr. Johannes Kaempf, ended the 4 August session with the statement: "The German people are united to the last man, to win or die on the battlefield for German honour and German unity".

The General Commission of German Trade Unions, the umbrella organisation of the Free Trade Unions with close ties to the Social Democrats, had declared on 2 August that it would refrain from wage increases and strikes during the war. The liberal Hirsch-Dunckersche trade unions and the Christian trade unions made similar statements. All of the unions hoped that their support would lead to rewards in the form of social reforms after the war. Initially the number of strikes dropped precipitously, from a total of over four million work days spent on strike in 1913 to fewer than 5,000 in 1915. In January 1918, however, when war weariness and hunger were widespread, an estimated one million workers went on strike across Germany.

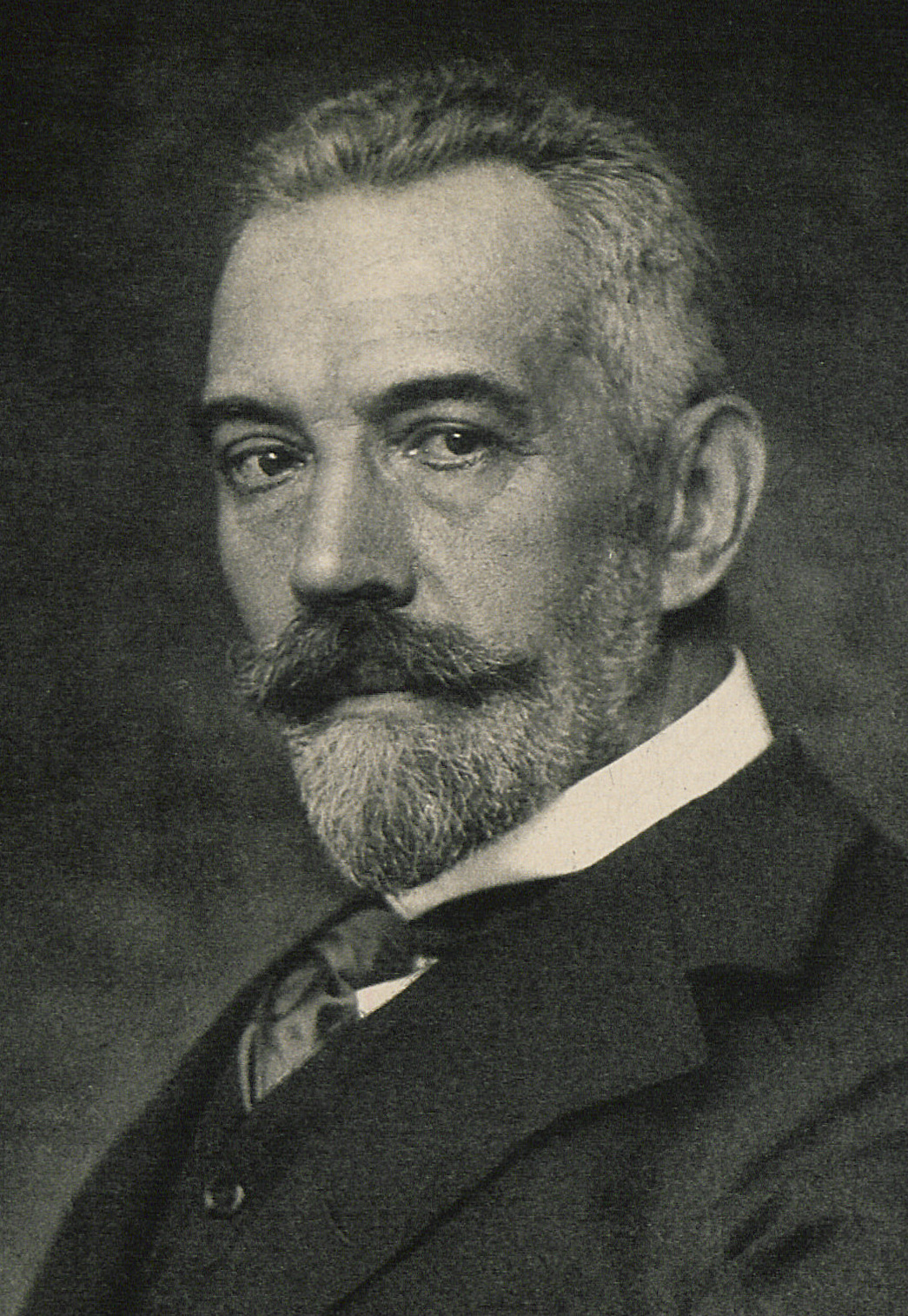
Theobald von Bethmann Hollweg, German chancellor from July 1909 until July 1917

The press also ceased public disputes with the government for the duration of the war and practised self-censorship. In accordance with Article 68 of the German Constitution, the imposition of a state of war meant that freedom of the press was restricted by censorship measures anyway. The government nevertheless allowed the SPD's Vorwärts to be sold in Prussian train stations from the beginning of the war.

As in the trade unions, the political parties on the left expected their agreement to the Burgfrieden to provide payback at the end of the war. Eduard David of the SPD, looking ahead to potential social reforms said, "We expect democratic suffrage reform as the price of the working class's war effort." Others saw the need for the government to accept opinions from all sides on domestic matters. Chancellor Bethmann Hollweg wanted to integrate the former "journeymen without a fatherland" into the nation, although he did not consider asking the SPD to join the government, as the socialists did in France as part of their union sacrée (Sacred Union), which was roughly comparable to Germany's Burgfrieden.

The political right, on the other hand, thought that the perceived unity behind the Burgfrieden proved that there was no need to make political changes. The Pan-German League went so far as to claim that the "Spirit of 1914" would eliminate the SPD because all Germans had become pan-German.

== The truce's weakening ==
Less than a year after the start of the Burgfrieden, by mid-1915, it was seldom mentioned. Discussions about the war tended to center on war aims. Plans for annexations to Germany in both the east and the west were talked about extensively. The government developed the Septemberprogramm with extensive annexation goals in September 1914 when it expected that Germany would quickly win the war, but Bethmann Hollweg never spoke of it publicly. The annexationist goals discussed among the political parties were contrary to the original justification for the war as defensive and were also not in the spirit of the Burgfrieden. Eduard Bernstein, Hugo Haase and Karl Kautsky, all in the left wing of the SPD, wrote in Das Gebot der Stunde ("The Need of the Day") in June 1915:

In view of all these declarations, German Social Democracy must ask itself whether it can reconcile with its principles, and with the duties incumbent upon it as the guardian of the material and moral interests of the working classes of Germany, the question of standing by those whose intentions are in the sharpest contradiction to the provisions of the declaration of our Reichstag party membership of 4 August 1914, in which we stated that, in agreement with the International, we condemn any war of conquest.

By the end of the war, Burgfrieden had become an appeal to a mythical "August Experience" – the Spirit of 1914 – while in the political arena it was used as an accusation that the other side was failing to follow it.

== Effects ==
Logo of the USPD, which split from the main Social Democratic Party over issues related to the Burgfrieden

Disagreement over the Burgfrieden caused increasing divisions within the SPD, not just in the Reichstag but also in the party as a whole and the unions allied with it. In December 1915, after 44 SPD members voted against additional war credits in a party caucus, 20 went on to vote no in the full Reichstag. After the anti-war faction voted against an emergency budget in early 1916, it was excluded from the SPD's parliamentary membership and formed the Socialist Working Group (Sozialistische Arbeitsgemeinschaft, SAG), which aggressively criticised the government's war policies. In 1917 the group formally established its own party, the Independent Social Democrats (Unabhängige Sozialdemokratische Partei Deutschlands, USPD). Many of them joined the Communist Party of Germany when it was established in January 1919.

In parallel to the war aims discussions was one about a "new orientation" of German domestic policies, which assumed a victorious end to the war. The right saw it as support for the authoritarian state, while the reforms discussed by moderates and the left centered on eliminating Prussia's three-class franchise, which weighted votes based on taxes paid and therefore favoured the wealthy. The reform of the electoral law that the Emperor announced in his Easter message of 1917 was, however, blocked by the Prussian House of Lords.

In July 1917, the Reichstag parties of the center and left formed the Inter-party Committee (Interfraktionelle Ausschuss) to discuss war policy and the post-war new orientation. By bringing parties together in a form similar to a parliamentary coalition, it was a first step towards the parliamentarisation of the German Reichstag. The Committee's work led to the Reichstag Peace Resolution, a call for a negotiated peace without annexations. It marked an unprecedented attempt by the Reichstag rather than the imperial government to shape foreign policy. The German constitutional reforms of October 1918, which made the chancellor dependent on the confidence of the Reichstag rather than the emperor, were implemented only after the Supreme Army Command admitted that the war was lost. Weeks later, the Empire was overthrown in the German Revolution of 1918–1919.

== See also ==
- Internationalist–defencist schism
- Sacred Union
