= Zimmerwald Conference =

1915 international socialist conference in Switzerland

- Begins: September 5, 1915
- Ends: September 8, 1915
- Location: Zimmerwald
- Country: Switzerland
- Next event: Kienthal Conference
- Participants: 38

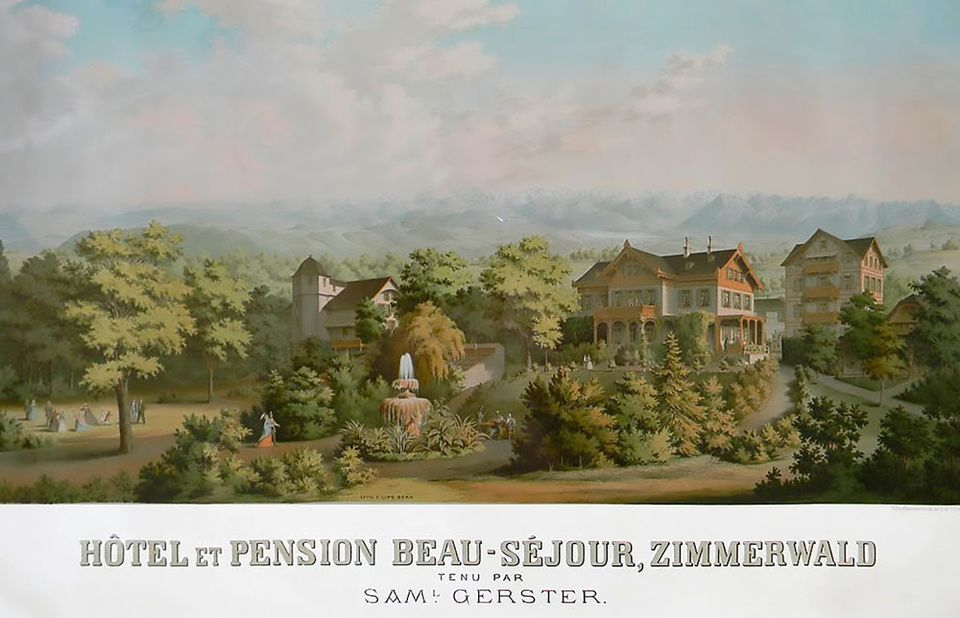
The Hotel Beau Séjour, site of the Zimmerwald conference, in 1864

The Zimmerwald Conference, held in Zimmerwald, Switzerland, from September 5 to 8, 1915, was the first of three international conferences convened by anti-militarist socialists in response to the outbreak of World War I and the resulting virtual collapse of the Second International. Those participating in this and later conferences at Kienthal and Stockholm are known as the Zimmerwald movement. The Zimmerwald Conference began the final unraveling of the coalition within the Second International between revolutionary socialists, known as the "Zimmerwald Left" supporting Vladimir Lenin's line, and reformist socialists.

The conference issued a manifesto which denounced the war, blaming it on reactionary capitalist governments, and called for working-class unity and for a peace without annexations or reparations. It also established the International Socialist Commission to work for an end to the hostilities. Lenin opposed the majority, criticizing the adoption of peace as the overriding goal. He instead argued for the fighting to be transformed into socialist revolutions, and for the foundation of a new international, which was realized in the Russian October Revolution of 1917 and in the Comintern, founded 1919.

== Background ==
=== Socialist discussions on war ===
When the Second International, the primary international socialist organization before World War I, was founded in 1889, internationalism was one of its central tenets. "The workers have no Fatherland", Karl Marx and Friedrich Engels had declared in The Communist Manifesto. Paul Lafargue, Marx's son-in-law, in his keynote address at the International's founding congress called upon socialists to be "brothers with a single common enemy [...] private capital, whether it be Prussian, French, or Chinese". Despite this commitment to internationalism and the establishment in 1900 of the International Socialist Bureau (ISB) based in Brussels to manage the movement's affairs, the International remained but a loose confederation of national organizations, which considered political issues in national terms.

The French delegate Edouard Vaillant told the Second International's founding congress that "war, the most tragic product of present economic relations, can only disappear when capitalist production has made way for the emancipation of labor and the international triumph of socialism." Opposition to war became a pillar of its program, but the question of what to do if war broke out would preoccupy socialists throughout the International's history and was the most controversial question discussed among the International's leading figures. Domela Nieuwenhuis from the Netherlands repeatedly suggested calling a general strike and launching an armed uprising if war should break out, but his proposals failed. The Second International did not seriously address the question of how it intended to oppose war until its 1907 congress in Stuttgart, after the 1905–1906 Moroccan Crisis brought the issue to the fore. In Stuttgart, the French Section of the Workers' International (SFIO) suggested employing all possible means to prevent war, including demonstrations, general strikes, and insurrections. The Social Democratic Party of Germany (SPD) was strongly opposed to any mention of general strikes. As a result, the resolution the congress promulgated was contradictory. It called on workers to "exert every effort to prevent the outbreak of war by means they consider most effective," but eschewed resistance to war as impractical, in favor of organizing opposition. When the 1912 Balkan War threatened to escalate into a wider conflict, the socialists organized a special congress in Basel, not in order to debate, but to protest military escalation. Like the 1907 meeting, it failed to yield any agreement on what tactics to employ in order to prevent war.

Vladimir Lenin

The socialist movement was beset by fundamental political disagreements, which led to organizational splits in several countries. The International's wavering on anti-war tactics reflected these political differences. The revisionist right advocated a gradual evolution towards socialism within the framework of the nation-state, defended European colonialism, and supported patriotism. Centrists at times pushed back against these positions, but also supported certain forms of patriotism. The German social democrat August Bebel, for example, was determined "never to abandon a single piece of German soil to the foreigner." The French leader Jean Jaurès criticized Marx and Engels' maxim that the "workers have no Fatherland" as "vain and obscure subtleties" and a "sarcastic negation of history itself." In 1912, Karl Kautsky, one of the chief Marxist theorists, began to push back against the notion that capitalist imperialism necessarily led to militarism and predicted an era of ultra-imperialism in which capitalist cooperation could maintain international peace. The radical left was most decidedly anti-war. It considered war a consequence of imperialism, which became a central concept in the left's analyses. "Imperialism grows in lawlessness and violence, both in aggression against the non-capitalist world and in ever more serious conflicts among the competing capitalist countries. The mere tendency toward imperialism by itself takes forms that make the final phase of capitalism a period of catastrophe", according to Rosa Luxemburg. Vladimir Lenin similarly argued against defending one's nation.

=== Outbreak of World War I ===
On June 28, 1914, the Austrian Archduke Franz Ferdinand was assassinated in Sarajevo, leading to the outbreak of war on July 28. Socialists were surprised by how quickly the issue escalated to war and their reactions were improvised. Most believed that the war would be short and that their respective nations were engaged in self-defense. On August 4, the Reichstag, Germany's parliament, voted for war credits. The socialist delegates unanimously voted for the measures. The policy of supporting the government's war efforts became known as the Burgfrieden or civil truce. On the same day, socialists also rallied behind the war in France, where socialist acquiescence became known as the union sacrée. The following day, the Parliamentary Labour Party in the United Kingdom voted to support the government in the war. The socialist parties in most belligerent countries eventually supported their country's war effort. Even some on the left of the international socialist movement such as the German Konrad Haenisch, the French Gustave Hervé and Jules Guesde (the latter becoming a government minister), and the Russian Georgi Plekhanov supported this policy. Socialists in the initially non-belligerent nations generally denounced the war and insisted their governments remain out of it, but several parties collaborated with their governments to give them war-time powers.

Socialists' support for the war partly reflected workers' patriotic sentiments. Before hostilities commenced, there were anti-war demonstrations in all major European cities, including a march of 20,000 in Hamburg on July 28. However, when the war began many welcomed it. According to the French labor leader Alphonse Merrheim, anyone resisting the war might have been shot by French workers, rather than the police. By 1914, the European labor movement was in many ways firmly integrated into the capitalist system it opposed. While advocating revolution, in effect socialism mostly carved out a position for workers within capitalist society. Socialist support for governments at war was the result of this evolution. With this support, socialists hoped to solidify their place within the national community. Even if socialists had tried, they may not have been able to stop the war. Large demonstrations alone likely would not have been enough to force governments to stop the war. They did not have majorities in parliaments, had not prepared for mass strikes, and the way the International was organized did not lend itself to quick coordinated action. Rather than oppose the war and risk being suppressed by their governments, most socialists decided to support their governments in the war.

Socialist support for the war was not universal. Many socialists were shocked by their parties' acquiescence to the war. Luxemburg and Clara Zetkin reportedly considered suicide upon hearing the news. Until August 20, the Romanian socialist press chose to disbelieve reports that the SPD intended to support the German war effort. While most of the right and the center of the socialist movement supported their governments in the war and most of the left was opposed, socialists' responses to the new situation did not neatly follow a left–right split. In Germany, fourteen of the ninety-two socialist Reichstag members were opposed to voting in favor of war credits in the parliamentary fraction's internal caucus, but they bowed to party discipline to make the vote unanimous. Among the fourteen was Hugo Haase, the party co-chairman who announced the socialists' support to the Reichstag. In December 1914, the left-winger Karl Liebknecht flouted party discipline by casting a lone vote against war credits. He became the most prominent socialist opponent of the war in Europe. The left including Liebknecht and Luxemburg formed the International Group which criticized the war and the socialist leadership's support. Fearing that the left would gain support, anti-war centrists including Kautsky and Haase also began to promote peace. In France, the opposition to the war and the union sacrée began to rally in the fall of 1914. The Federation of Metal Workers and its leader Merrheim were at the forefront of the opposition to the war. At the August 1915 national conference of the General Confederation of Labor (CGT) an anti-war resolution introduced by Merrheim and Albert Bourderon was voted down seventy-nine to twenty-six. There was also an opposition in the SFIO. Overall, the French opposition remained cautious. The Italian Socialist Party (PSI) was an exception in Europe in that it was as a whole opposed to the war, although a minoritarian pro-war faction led by Benito Mussolini advocated intervention on behalf of the Allies, but he was expelled from the party. Throughout Europe, the socialist opposition to the war was initially weak and fragmented into moderates and revolutionaries. It was hindered by censorship and restrictions on movement and communication that resulted from the war. The progression of the war, popular war fatigue, and the material hardships caused by the war all contributed to the growth of this opposition.

The split in the socialist movement was not just a result of the war, but of the incompatibility between different versions of Marxism that co-existed within the Second International. As the German socialist Philipp Scheidemann later stated: "The war gave rise to a schism within the party, but I believe it would eventually have come to pass even without the war." The war made continuing the Second International's activities impossible. The SFIO and the Belgian Labor Party (POB) refused to engage with socialists from the Central Powers and the ISB was paralyzed. Socialists who opposed the war drew a variety of conclusions from what they considered the International's failure. Most felt that pre-war socialism could be revived. P.J. Troelstra from the Netherlands held that the Second International had only been too weak to stop the war and was still alive. Others held that the failure was complete. Luxemburg stated that "everything is lost, all that remains is our honour". Leon Trotsky called the Second International a "rigid shell" from which socialism must be liberated. Lenin denounced it as a "stinking corpse" and, at a Bolshevik conference in Berne in early 1915, called for the formation of a Third International.

== Preparations ==
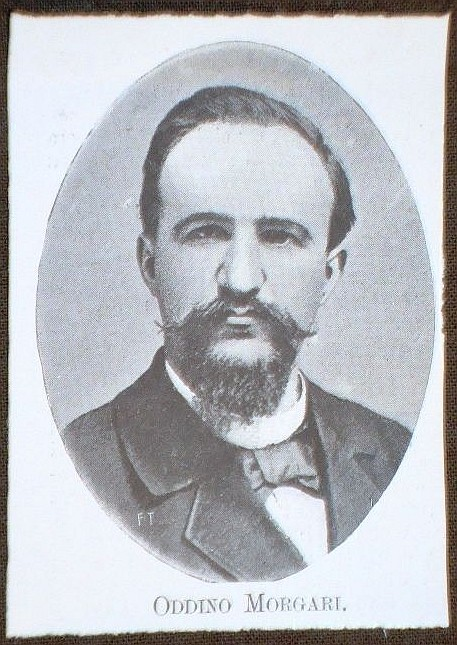
Oddino Morgari

With the Second International inactive, the maintenance of relations between socialists fell to independent initiatives. Representatives of socialist parties from neutral countries met in Lugano, Switzerland in September 1914, in Stockholm in October 1914, and in Copenhagen in January 1915. The conference in Lugano, which involved members of the Swiss SPS and the Italian PSI, denounced the war as "the result of the imperialist policy of the great powers", and called on the ISB to resume its activities. This meeting would become known as the cradle of the Zimmerwald movement. Pro-war socialists also held conferences. Those from Allied countries met in London in February 1915 and those from the Central powers followed suit in Vienna in April 1915. Socialists from opposing sides of the war first came together at socialist women's and youth conferences in Berne in March and April 1915, respectively. Both conferences resolutely denounced the war and socialists' support for it.

In late 1914 and early 1915, the Swiss and Italian parties, hoping to revive the International, looked to continue the dialogue started in Lugano. They intended to convoke a conference for socialists from all neutral countries with the ISB's blessing. In April 1915, the Italian parliamentary deputy Oddino Morgari, after consulting with the Swiss, traveled to France on behalf of the Italian party. Morgari, though part of the PSI's right wing, was a pacifist and in favor of the socialist movement actively working for peace. He met with the Belgian socialist leader Emile Vandervelde, chairman of the Executive Committee of the Bureau, seeking the ISB's support. His proposals were flatly rejected by Vandervelde, whom Morgari accused of holding the ISB hostage, to which Vandervelde replied: "Yes, but a hostage for freedom and justice." In Paris, Morgari also held discussions with the Menshevik Julius Martov who convinced him of the necessity of a conference of anti-war socialists independent of the ISB. This idea was boosted by the fact that at the same time as discussions with Morgari were taking place, a manifesto written by the anti-war opposition in the SPD had made its way to France and inspired the French opposition. He also met with Trotsky, Victor Chernov, and French anti-war socialists grouped around Merrheim and Pierre Monatte. From Paris, Morgari traveled to London where the Independent Labour Party (ILP) and the British Socialist Party (BSP) expressed interest in a general conference of anti-war socialists. At a party meeting on May 15–16, the PSI endorsed a meeting of all socialist parties and groups opposed to the war. Morgari discussed the proposal with Robert Grimm of the SPS. Grimm, a young, eloquent, and ambitious leader on the Swiss party's left wing, was unable to obtain his party's support for the proposal, but it did approve "individual" action for peace. Grimm, with the PSI's blessing, became the project's prime mover and announced a preparatory meeting to take place in Berne in July.

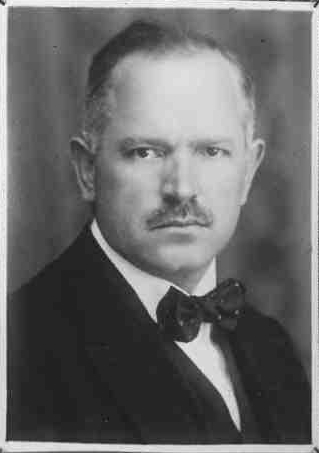
Robert Grimm

The July 11 organizing conference was attended by seven delegates: the Bolshevik Grigory Zinoviev, the Menshevik Pavel Axelrod, Angelica Balabanoff and Oddino Morgari of the Italian Socialist Party, Adolf Warski of the Social Democracy of the Kingdom of Poland and Lithuania, Maksymilian Horwitz of the Polish Socialist Party – Left, and Robert Grimm of the Social Democratic Party of Switzerland. Only the Italians arrived from abroad, as the others, besides Grimm, were exiles residing in Switzerland. The meeting began with discussions of whom to invite to the conference. Grimm proposed that all socialists opposed to the war and in favor of a renewal of class struggle be welcomed. Zinoviev countered that participation be limited to the revolutionary left. In the end, the meeting decided to invite all socialists explicitly opposed to the war, including French and German anti-war centrists such as Haase and Kautsky. Zinoviev also called for the participation of various left groups, but was again voted down as none of the delegates supported his proposal. The meeting decided to limit participation to members of the Second International, but this restriction was ultimately not enforced. The Bolshevik representative advocated discussing the formation of a Third International, but this controversy was tabled. The meeting unanimously endorsed the PSI's moderate May 17 and June 18 declarations which emphasized the struggle for peace. A second preparatory conference was planned for August, but ultimately canceled.

On August 19, Grimm announced that the conference was scheduled for September 5. In the period leading up to that date, Grimm worked hard to secure participation in the conference, particularly from moderates. He invited "all parties, labor organizations, or groups within them" opposed to the war and loyal to the Second International's anti-war resolutions. He also made the final preparations for the conference. He put significant effort into keeping it secret, reserving the rundown Hotel Beau Séjour in Zimmerwald, a village near Berne, for an "ornithological society". Morgari visited London to invite internationalists from the ILP and BSP. Lenin, staying at a mountain resort in Sörenberg, expressed both excitement and skepticism upon hearing of the conference. He thought most participants would criticize militarism without drawing the proper revolutionary conclusions from this critique and thereby "help the bourgeoisie nip the revolutionary movement in the bud." His plan was to attend the conference in order to bring together the left and criticize the moderates. He wrote to his contacts to ensure that the left was well-represented. His efforts were not entirely successful. He was most disappointed that the Dutch left refused to participate in a conference also attended by moderates, even offering to pay for their trip to Switzerland.

In the days leading up to the conference, several private preparatory meetings took place as the delegates arrived in Berne. On September 4, a day before the start of the conference, Lenin invited the left to a meeting at Zinoviev's residence in Berne to prepare its strategy. It became clear that the left would be a minority. The leftists decided on a draft manifesto written by Karl Radek, but with several amendments proposed by Lenin. French and German delegates came together at another pre-conference meeting to prepare efforts for reconciliation between the two countries, but this meeting yielded few results.

== Participants ==
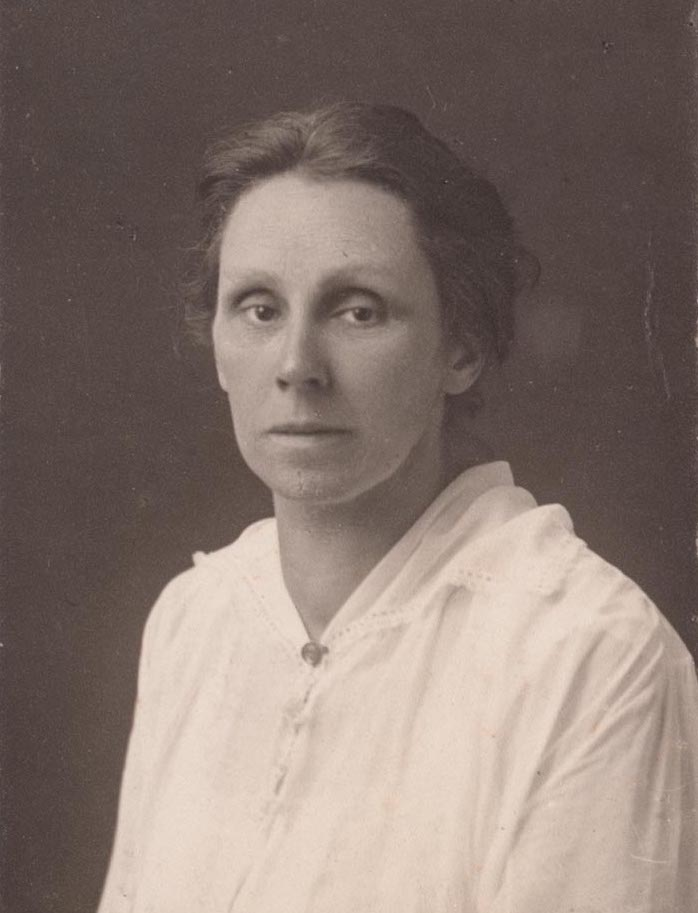
Henriette Roland Holst

The thirty-eight delegates assembled in Berne on Sunday, September 5, 1915. From Switzerland, Grimm, Charles Naine, Fritz Platten, and Karl Moor attended, but not as representatives of their party. From Italy came the PSI secretary Costantino Lazzari, Avanti! chief editor Giacinto Serrati, and party representatives Oddino Morgari, Angelica Balabanova, and Giuseppe Modigliani. Merrheim, the representative of the anti-war groups in the CGT and Bourderon also of the CGT, but at the same time part of the opposition in the SFIO, attended from France. Henriette Roland Holst was the delegate of the Social Democratic Workers' Party of the Netherlands. Zeth Höglund and Ture Nerman represented the Swedish and Norwegian youth leagues. Ten Germans attended. Ewald Vogtherr, Georg Ledebour, Adolph Hoffmann, Joseph Herzfeld, Minna Reichert, Heinrich Berges, and Gustav Lachenmaier, the first four of whom were Reichstag deputies who had to that point still voted for war credits, represented the minority within the SPD. Bertha Thalheimer and Ernst Meyer represented the International Group, a group of more radical anti-war socialists from Berlin led by Luxemburg, Karl Liebknecht, and Zetkin. Julian Borchardt came as a member of the International Socialists of Germany and the oppositional journal Lichtstrahlen. Vasil Kolarov participated for the Bulgarian Narrow socialists and Christian Rakovsky for the Social Democratic Party of Romania—both organizations had joined the Balkan Socialist Federation. Several organizations from the Russian Empire sent delegates to Zimmerwald. The Bolsheviks Lenin and Zinoviev represented the Central Committee of the RSDLP, while the Mensheviks Axelrod and Martov did so for its Organization Committee. The internationalist wing of the Socialist Revolutionary Party (SRP) sent Chernov and Mark Natanson. Trotsky attended in the name of Nashe Slovo, a group of Russian expatriates in Paris that edited an eponymous journal. P. L. Giřs (i.e. Liebmann Hersch; pseudonym: Lemanski) was the General Jewish Labor Bund's representative. Because the Bund did not give its emigrant leaders as much latitude to act on the organization's behalf, his role was limited to that of an observer without voting rights and he did not sign any of the conference's declarations. Jan Berzin was the delegate of the Social Democracy of the Latvian Territory. Finally, the Poles Radek, Warski, and Pavel Lewinson represented the regional presidium of the Social Democracy of the Kingdom of Poland and Lithuania (SDPKiL), its main presidium, and the Polish Socialist Party – Left (PPS–L), respectively.

The British delegation consisting of Frederick Jowett and Bruce Glasier of the ILP and Edwin C. Fairchild of the BSP did not make it to Switzerland, because the British authorities refused to issue them passports. Willi Münzenberg, the organizer of the April youth conference, was not admitted as a delegate of the newly founded Youth International. Karl Liebknecht could not attend because he had been conscripted. Austrian anti-war socialists decided not to attend because they did not want to exacerbate divisions within their party. Some sources erroneously list Ernst Graber, Nadezhda Krupskaya, Inessa Armand, or Kautsky among the conference's participants.

The Zimmerwald Conference brought together delegates from both sides of the war, but disagreements did not follow national lines. The participants split into three factions, although the divisions were at times blurred and there were disagreements within the factions. Eight delegates, Lenin, Zinoviev, Radek, Borchardt, Berzin, Platten, Höglund, and Nerman, formed the left. They favored openly revolutionary struggle and breaking with the Second International. They were opposed by the right who viewed the conference only as a demonstration against the war. The right made up a majority of the delegates consisting of nineteen or twenty delegates: most of the Germans, the French, the Mensheviks, and some of the Italians and Poles. In between was the center, which included among others Grimm, Trotsky, Balabanoff, and Roland-Holst. Compared to the International's pre-war congresses, the conference's number of participants and the range of countries represented was almost negligible. According to the political scientist Yves Collart, its composition was not necessarily representative of the socialist movement as a whole, or even of its left wing. The selection of delegates was haphazard and a result of personal contacts and practical circumstances.

== Sessions ==
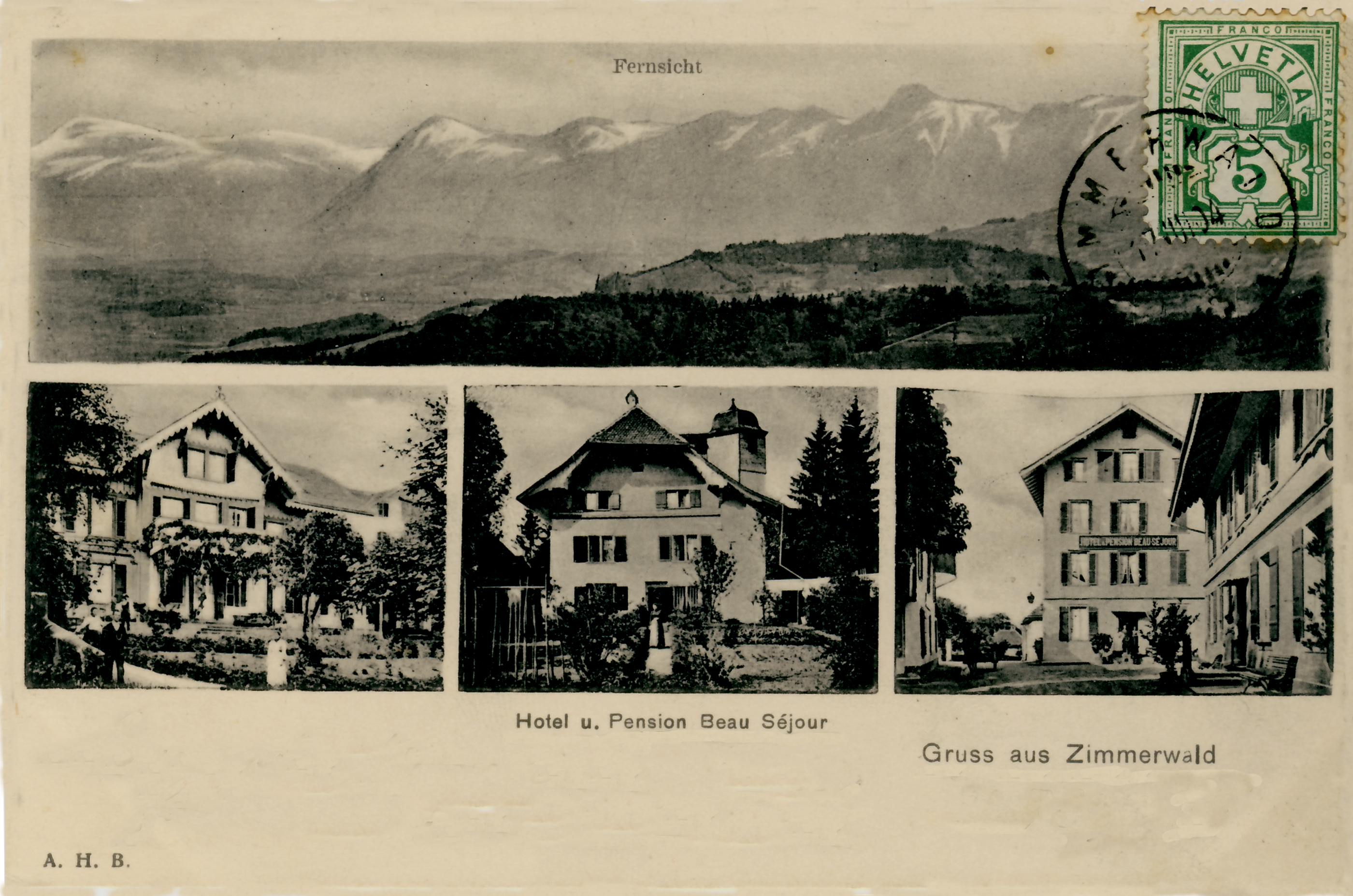
The Hotel Beau Séjour in 1904

Grimm greeted the delegates at the Volkshaus in Berne on the morning of September 5, before they moved on to Eiglerplatz. From there they left in four coaches for a two-hour ride to Zimmerwald, a small Prealpine village consisting of twenty-one houses some ten kilometers (six miles) to the south. According to Trotsky, on their way to Zimmerwald the delegates joked that "half a century after the formation of the First International it was still possible to fit all the internationalists in Europe into four coaches", but they were in an optimistic mood. In order to keep the meeting secret, the delegates were prohibited from sending letters while in Zimmerwald and they received no news from the outside world. In their spare time, they hiked the surrounding mountains and were entertained by Grimm's yodeling and Chernov's renditions of Russian folk tunes.

=== September 5 and 6 ===
Grimm opened the conference at 4 p.m. on the afternoon of September 5. He recounted how the meeting came to be and attacked the ISB for its inactivity. Nevertheless, he emphasized that the conference's goal was to rebuild the Second International, not to form a Third International. He called on the conference to "raise up the flag of socialism, which had slipped from the hands of the appointed representatives of socialism, and to erect over the gory battlefields the true symbol of humanity". Karl Liebknecht, the most prominent figure in the socialist resistance against the war, addressed the conference in a letter, which was delivered to Grimm by Liebnecht's wife Sophie, as he was unable to attend himself. It called for "civil war, not civil peace", referring to the Burgfrieden, and for a new International "to rise from the ruins of the old". The letter was read aloud and received considerable applause.

The first two days were spent on disputes over procedural matters and on delegates' opening statements on the situation in their respective countries. The highlights among the opening statements, according to the historian Agnes Blänsdorf, were the reports by the German and French delegations. In Merrheim's view, the conference's main task was Franco-German reconciliation. Both French delegates pointed out that the anti-war minorities in both countries had to work together: "If we supported each other, the movement against the war would grow and it could become possible to put an end to the butchery", according to Bourderon. The Germans Ledebour and Hoffmann agreed with the French. Ledebour's speech emphasized the importance of pragmatic tactics. Disagreements within the German delegation erupted on who had a right to speak for the German opposition, with the Reichstag members on the one side and the International Group on the other. According to the historian R. Craig Nation, the Scandinavian youth leagues gave the strongest opening statement. It called for support for anti-war actions by the masses and deemed revolution a prerequisite for peace. Of the Russian delegates, Axelrod was the main speaker. He pointed out that of the European socialist movements, Russian social democracy was the only movement that was united in its opposition to the war. He explained that this was due to the fact that Russian Czarism was so unambiguously counter-revolutionary. Axelrod and Zinoviev both sought to dispel the notion that exiled Russian socialists were mere doctrinaires with no connection to the workers' movement and stated that both wings of Russian social democracy wished to overcome the schism and re-establish socialist unity. Lapinski gave the opening statement for the three Polish groups, describing the war-time situation in Poland as "thousand times worse than in Belgium". Berzin in his statement on Latvia was optimistic that the movement in the Baltics was growing.

The conference decided to establish an Executive Bureau consisting of Grimm, Lazzari, and Rakovski to handle procedural matters. Squabbling within the German delegation erupted over Borchardt's status. The other Germans objected to his participation as a delegate with a mandate and threatened to leave. Lenin, outraged at the prospect of the only German on the left being excluded, defended Borchardt. During this dispute Ledebour, or possibly one of the other Germans, and Lenin passed notes to one another continuing the argument in private. The Executive Bureau agreed to demote his status to that of an observer without voting rights. The Bolsheviks suggested that each Polish and Russian organization be allocated an independent mandate. The Bureau decided that each national delegation should be granted five votes, to be distributed as each delegation sees fit. This had the effect of diminishing the influence of the left.

=== September 7 ===
Discussions on the central issue, the agenda item "Peace Action by the Proletariat", did not begin until the third day. The delegates hoped to achieve unanimous decisions, as this would send a signal of strength. This unanimity turned out to be difficult to achieve. Most of the discussion on this agenda item turned on the question of what was to be the goal of the movement. Lenin and the left pushed the debate in this direction. Radek was the first speaker and presented the resolution the left had agreed upon. Peace, he proclaimed, could only be achieved through revolution, but revolution could not stop at putting an end to war, but must lead to a struggle for socialism. Therefore, socialists already had to start preparing for revolution. Lenin added that this preparation entailed abandoning the existing organizations and forming a Third International. Socialists faced a choice between "true revolutionary struggle" and "empty phrases" about peace. Lenin's and Radek's positions were supported by the other left delegates.

Grimm was the first to challenge the left's presentation. He considered Radek's reasoning "unsuitable", asking him: "Do we want a manifesto for party comrades or for the broad masses of the workers?" Except for Serrati, the Italian delegation's position was diametrically opposed to that of the left. The Italians insisted that the conference's purpose was only to resist the war and promote peace. Lazzari dismissed Radek's tone as "pretentious", expressed doubt that insurrections could be successful at this time, and was concerned that radicalism could exacerbate the splits within the International. The French expressed similar views. Merrheim called Lenin's suggestions the fantasies of a sectarian. According to him, the French working class had lost confidence in socialism and this confidence could only be regained by speaking of peace. The Germans Ledebour and Hoffmann agreed. They accused the left of not following their own calls for demonstrations and revolution as they were comfortable in exile. Hoffmann added that the only thing to be done at that moment was to return to the old forms of class struggle and to call for peace. Ledebour held that "to restore the International and to work for peace" were the only purposes of the conference. He introduced a draft resolution of his own, in opposition to the left's.

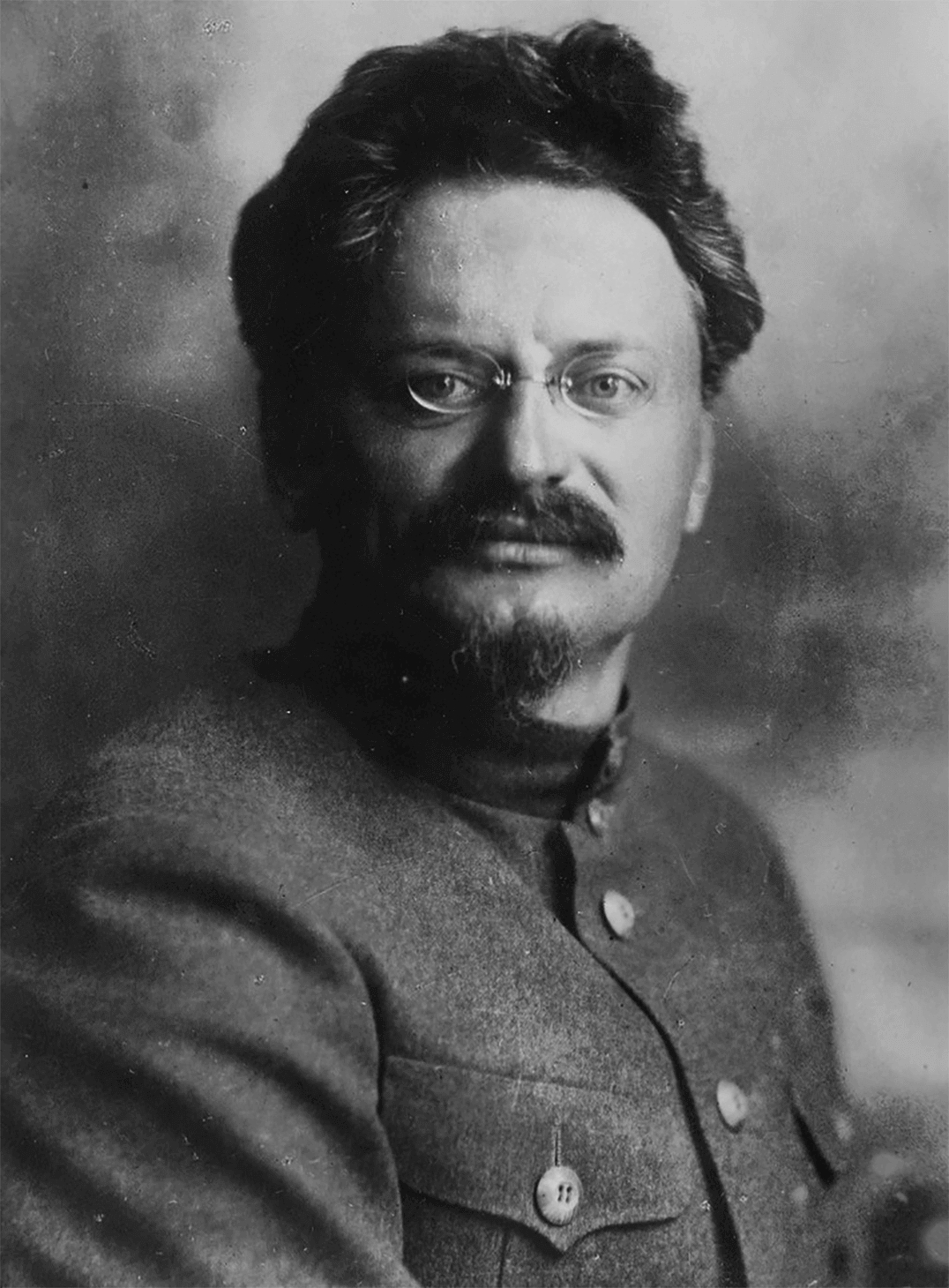
Leon Trotsky

The positions of Trotsky, Chernov, Thalheimer, and Meyer were similar to the left's, but they disagreed on some tactical issues. Thalheimer and Meyer objected to the left wanting to dictate party tactics to national sections and Thalheimer deemed the left's manifesto "tactically unwise". Serrati proclaimed that "if the war were not a fact, I would vote for Lenin's resolution. Today it comes either too early or too late." The debate continued well into the night of September 7. The left, though in the minority, succeeded in determining the structure of the debate and preventing a consensus among the moderates. Merrheim eventually succeeded in uniting the moderate majority, arguing that the proletariat was disillusioned and not yet ready for revolution. He attacked Lenin: "A revolutionary movement can only grow from a striving for peace. You, comrade Lenin, are not motivated by this striving for peace, but by the desire to set up a new International. This is what divides us." It was decided to create a commission to write the conference resolution. It consisted of Ledebour, Lenin, Trotsky, Grimm, Merrheim, Modigliani, and Rakovski. The same disagreements continued in the commission. Another confrontation arose when Lenin suggested including a call for parties to vote against war credits. Ledebour managed to deflect this initiative by threatening that the Germans would leave Zimmerwald if such a call were to be included. In the end, Trotsky was tasked with writing a draft resolution.

=== September 8 ===
Trotsky's draft was put before the full conference for discussion the next morning. Grimm directly asked Lenin not to endanger the movement's unity by overemphasizing strategic disagreements. The controversy over support for war credits arose again. Roland-Holst and Trotsky joined the left in demanding that a call for socialists to vote against war credits under any circumstances be included in the manifesto. Ledebour again shut the discussion down by issuing another ultimatum. Grimm successfully deflected further suggested amendments. Chernov objected that the draft did not specifically mention the Russian Czar, the Russian monarchy's culpability for the war, the peasantry's suffering during the war, or the prospect of agrarian socialism. Ledebour threatened to withhold his support if Radek, who had been excluded from the SPD before the war, signed it. Finally, Morgari to the other delegates' surprise threatened to veto the manifesto. He insisted that it state that Germany was more to blame for the war than other countries. Morgari was talked into withdrawing his objection. Eventually, Grimm put an end to the debate. Everyone agreed to support the draft manifesto, although the two Socialist Revolutionaries Chernov and Natanson had to be pressured into this. The delegates cheered and sang "The Internationale".

After passing the manifesto, the conference, at Ledebour's suggestion, decided to create the International Socialist Commission (ISC) to coordinate socialist anti-war activities. The left considered this a first step towards the creation of a new International, while the others insisted that its role was merely to facilitate the "exchange of correspondence", as Ledebour stated. The latter view prevailed. Grimm, Naine, Morgari, and Balabanoff, who was to act as interpreter, were chosen as the ISC's permanent members. No representative of the left was included. The secretariat of the ISC was to be located in Berne and managed by Grimm and Balabanoff. Grimm announced that the ISC would restrict its activities to issuing an international bulletin and coordinating the movement for peace. Most delegations pledged financial contributions.

Grimm reminded the delegates not to take documents from the meeting across international borders and to wait fourteen days before discussing it, so everyone would have time to return to their home country before news spread. He closed the conference at 2:30 am on the morning of September 9. According to Balabanoff, everyone was exhausted and "the work was completed, but the weariness was so great that almost no joy could be taken in its realization."

== Manifesto and resolutions ==
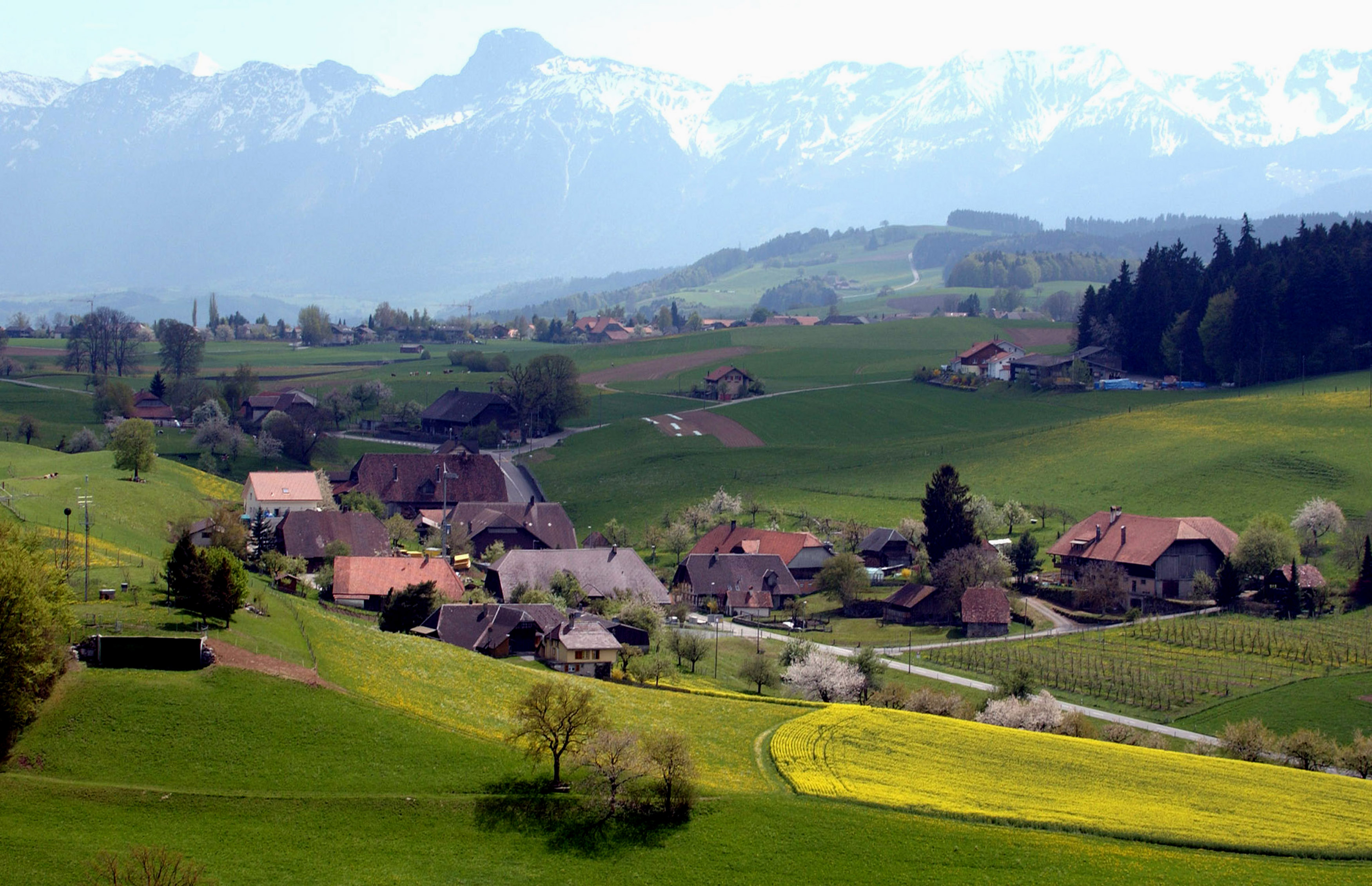
Zimmerwald in 2001

The French and German delegations issued a joint declaration. It was a product of their agreement during the opening discussions. It denounced Germany's violation of Belgian neutrality and called for the restoration of Belgian independence. The Germans suggested including this passage as they feared Germany could seek to annex Belgium. The statement did not address the future of Alsace-Lorraine. It denounced imperialism by all governments as the cause of the war and called on socialist parties to abandon their support for the war and return to the class struggle. The aim of that struggle must be immediate peace without annexations. The French and the Germans vowed to fight for peace until their governments ended the war.

The Zimmerwald Manifesto, which the conference adopted, is addressed to the "Workers of Europe". It is similar to Trotsky's original draft and mostly reflects the Zimmerwald centrists' views, with some concessions to the right. The text mostly appeals to the working class's emotion and does not contain the statement of principles Lenin called for. The manifesto begins with a drastic description of the causes and consequences of the war, which is said to "unveil the naked form of modern Capitalism". The war had turned Europe into a "gigantic human slaughter-house", while the "most savage barbarity is celebrating its triumph over everything that was previously the pride of mankind", it claims. It deems "misery and privation, unemployment and want, underfeeding and disease" as well as "intellectual and moral desolation, economic disaster, political reaction" to be the effects of the Great War. Its causes, according to the Zimmerwaldists, is imperialism and the fact that each ruling class sought to redraw borders in accordance with its interests. The manifesto goes on to criticize the socialist parties for abandoning their previous resolutions by entering the Burgfrieden, voting for war credits, and entering war-time governments. "And just as Socialist Parties failed separately," it claims, "so did the most responsible representative of the Socialists of all countries fail: the International Socialist Bureau." The war is to be ended with no annexations and no reparations. To this end, the manifesto calls on workers to fight "for [their] own cause, for the sacred aims of Socialism, for the salvation of the oppressed nations and the enslaved classes, by means of the irreconcilable working-class struggle". The goal of this struggle was to restore peace.

The positions expressed in the Zimmerwald Manifesto were, for the most part, in line with the Second International's pre-war resolutions. Its description of the war only differed from those statements in that it held all wars in advanced capitalism to be imperialist in nature and therefore national defense to be meaningless. Its critique of socialists' votes for war credits was not to be interpreted as a demand that socialists vote against granting them, according to Ledebour and Hoffmann. The manifesto was the greatest common denominator the delegates could agree on and did not include any of Lenin's demands: opposition to war credits, a clear condemnation of revisionism, and a call to revolutionary civil war. The left expressed its disagreements with the manifesto in an addendum. This statement described the manifesto's insufficiencies, criticizing that it did not denounce opportunism, "the chief culprit of the collapse of the International", and did not set forth any tactics for the struggle against the war. Nevertheless, the leftists explained, they decided to sign the Zimmerwald Manifesto because they understood it as a call to a struggle in which they intended to fight alongside the other participants.

== Reactions and aftermath ==
Trotsky recalled in 1930 that soon after the conference "the hitherto unknown name of Zimmerwald was echoed throughout the world". On September 20, Grimm, in the Berner Tagwacht, announced the conference as "the beginning of a new epoch" in which the International would return to the class struggle. Yet, news of the Zimmerwald Conference was slow to spread through Europe, partly due to censorship. In Italy, Serrati was able to publish the Zimmerwald Manifesto in the socialist newspaper Avanti! on October 14 by deceiving the censor with a fake version. In Paris, Trotsky's Nashe Slovo was prohibited from discussing the conference, so he published a fictitious diary discussing the conference without mentioning it directly. Reports on the conference as well as the manifesto were disseminated throughout Europe by socialist journals and by leaflets distributed by supporters.

The significance of the Zimmerwald conference was that it gave socialist opponents of the war a psychological boost. It united and organized socialist opposition to the war, by bringing together anti-militarists from different countries, including countries from opposing sides of the conflict. After the conference, a Zimmerwald movement slowly, but surely emerged. Throughout Europe, popular dissatisfaction with the war mounted, as the numbers of casualties grew, living conditions at home deteriorated, and governments' claims that they were waging wars of defense became increasingly untenable. This dissatisfaction bolstered the socialist anti-war minority as the rank-and-file became disillusioned with the leadership's support for the war. The Zimmerwald movement spread as far as Siberia where a group of Mensheviks adopted the positions of Zimmerwald's moderate wing.

According to the historian Willi Gautschi, the Zimmerwald Conference was clearly a defeat for Lenin and the left. Their calls for the formation of a Third International and for immediate revolution were rejected. R. Craig Nation and Alfred Erich Senn, also historians, disagree with this assessment. According to them, Lenin never expected to dominate the anti-war movement, but to consolidate a revolutionary opposition to the strategy of mere peace. Such an opposition did, in fact, emerge from the conference and managed to have an impact on the discussions that was disproportionate to its size. After the conference, the Zimmerwald Left formally adopted Radek's draft manifesto as its working program, selected Lenin, Radek, and Zinoviev as a coordinating bureau, and launched a series of brochures under the name Internationale Flugblätter to act as its newsletter and a short-lived theoretical journal entitled Vorbote.

In February 1916, the ISC planned a second Zimmerwald Conference, the Kiental Conference. It took place from April 24 to the night of April 30 – May 1. The manifesto adopted in Kiental, "To the People Driven to Ruin and Death", represented a leftward shift relative to the Zimmerwald movement's previous statements. In 1916, dissatisfaction with the war grew. On May 1, large demonstrations against the war, which defied the socialist majorities which supported their countries, took place in several European cities, with 10,000 marching in Berlin. Hunger strikes and more demonstrations followed in the summer. This tide of militancy confirmed the left's position, according to Lenin. The left was able to expand its numbers and its influence within the Zimmerwald movement. Conversely, several socialist parties that supported the war saw their membership decline. The German SPD, for instance, lost 63 percent of its members between August 1914 and 1916. This wave of protest culminated in the 1917 February Revolution in Russia, which toppled the Czarist government.Nation 1989, p. 171 The gulf between the left and right of the Zimmerwald movement widened and the movement effectively collapsed during the months between the February Revolution and the October Revolution. The decline of the movement was partly a result of the infighting between the left and the center and the left's splitting tactics. The historian David Kirby also attributes it to the fact that peace was starting to become a real possibility and the ISB was resuming its activity and the majority of the Zimmerwald movement sought nothing more than peace. In addition, Grimm, the figure most capable of unifying and leading the movement, left. In June, an international diplomatic scandal forced him to step down from the ISC and control over this organization was in effect handed to the left. Balabanoff became the ISC's secretary and Höglund, Nerman, and Carl Carleson members. At the Third Zimmerwald Conference, held in Stockholm in September, the positions of the left, which was still only a minority in the Zimmerwald movement, gained traction with many delegates.

The October Revolution, in which the Bolsheviks seized power, made the questions around which the Zimmerwald movement revolved largely moot. The ISC remained in existence for a year after the revolution. It supported and promoted the Bolsheviks' policies, including Russia's peace treaty with Germany. This alienated the ISC from most of its affiliates who were skeptical of the October Revolution and the Bolsheviks. In March 1919, the Third International, also known as the Comintern, was formed at a conference in Moscow. The Comintern asserted its continuity with the previous Internationals through Zimmerwald as an intermediary. At the founding congress, a resolution signed by Lenin, Platten, Radek, Rakovski, and Zinoviev, announced the dissolution of the Zimmerwald movement and its merger with the Comintern. According to the resolution, "the Zimmerwald union has outlived itself. All that was truly revolutionary in the Zimmerwald union has passed over to and joined with the Communist International." Balabanoff, speaking for the ISC, endorsed the formation of the Comintern, saying that Zimmerwald had merely been a temporary, defensive organization. The Twenty-one Conditions for admission to the Comintern were very similar to the platform of the Zimmerwald left and much of the international communist movement that emerged in the post-war years arose from the Zimmerwald left.

== Legacy ==
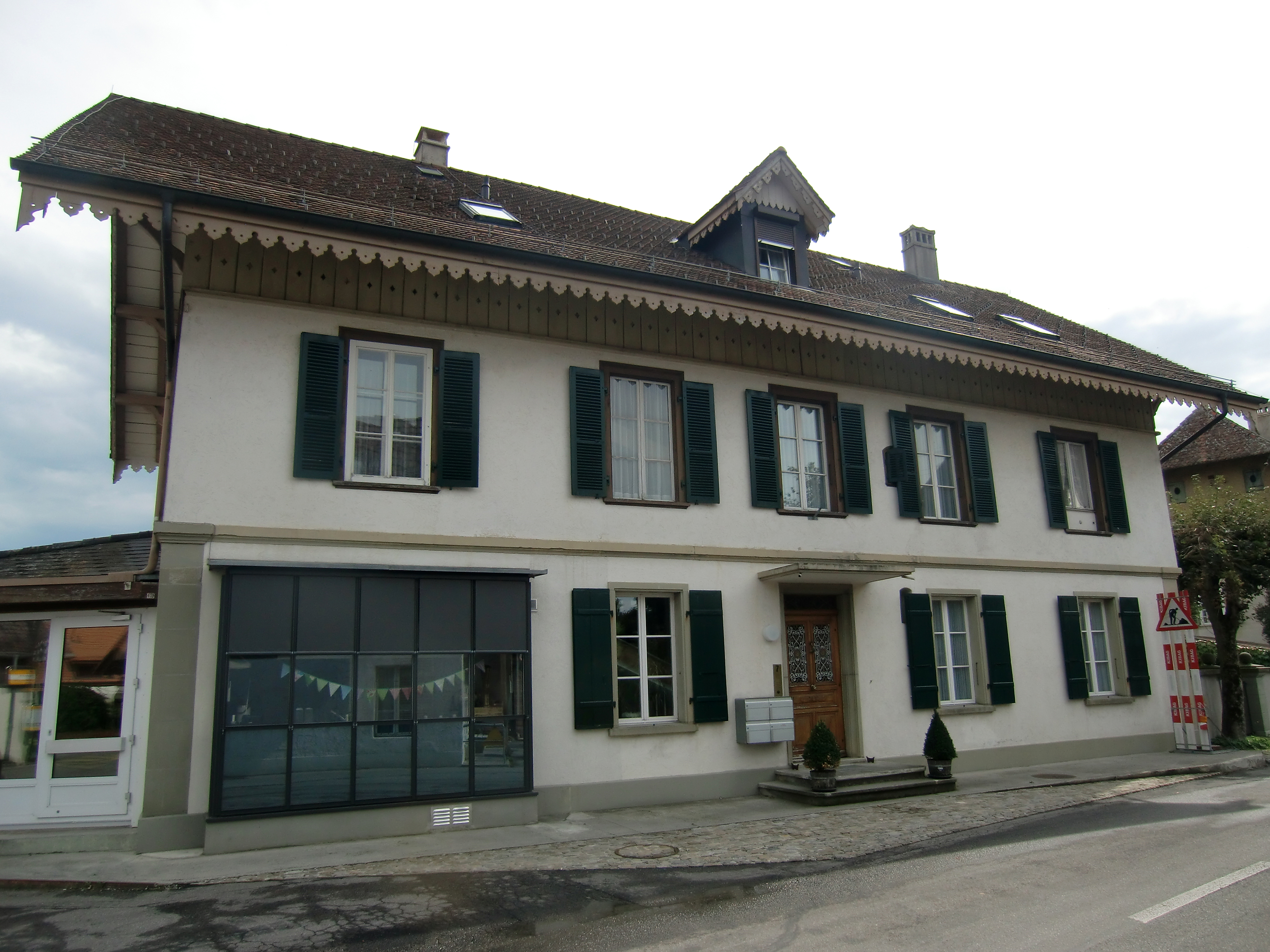
The Hotel Beau Séjour in 2011

The Zimmerwald conference was a key step in the schism of the European labor movement into a reformist socialist and a revolutionary communist wing.

As "the founding mythos of the Soviet Union", according to Swiss historian Julia Richers, the conference continued to be remembered in the USSR and its sphere of influence. On some Soviet maps, the small village of Zimmerwald was the only marked locality in Switzerland. During the Cold War, a large quantity of letters addressed to "the mayor of Zimmerwald" or "the director of the Lenin museum", which did not exist, arrived from Eastern Europe.

All this attention embarrassed the authorities of the thoroughly conservative country village, who long attempted to efface all traces of the conference. In 1963, the municipality outlawed the installation of any memorial plaques on the territory of Zimmerwald, and in 1973 the house in which Lenin was thought to have slept was razed to make room for a bus stop. Only in 2015, with the Cold War fading into memory, did the authorities of what is now the municipality of Wald organize a memorial event on the occasion of the conference's centenary.
