= List of software lobbying groups =

Software lobbying groups lobby governments and advocate generally to influence technology policy decisions on behalf of their members.

- Free Software Foundation
- Campaign for Creativity
- European Information & Communications Technology Industry Association (EICTA), now DigitalEurope
- Business Software Alliance
- Initiative for Software Choice
- Computing Technology Industry Association (CompTIA)
- Information Technology Industry Council (ITI)
