= ISC =

ISC may refer to:

== Arts and entertainment ==
- Imperial Space Command, a fictional organization in the books by Catherine Asaro
- Indian Society of Cinematographers, a non-profit cultural and educational organisation
- International Sculpture Center, a non-profit organization headquartered in Hamilton, New Jersey, US
- Intervision Song Contest, an Eastern Bloc version of the Eurovision Song Contest from the 1970s and 1980s
- Iraq-Syria Caliphate or simply ISC, fictional terrorist organization (based on ISIS) in the 2017 Indian film Tiger Zinda Hai

== Science and technology ==
- International Science Council, a non-governmental organization uniting scientific bodies
- International Seismological Centre, a seismology data center
- Intersystem crossing, an excited state dynamic in chemistry and physics
- Iron–sulfur cluster biosynthesis protein family, machinery for producing iron–sulfur clusters

== Computing ==
- Initiative for Software Choice, a group of software vendors
- Interactive Systems Corporation, a defunct Unix vendor
- Internet Storm Center, a program run by the SANS Institute that monitors the level of malicious activity on the Internet
- International Supercomputing Conference, a yearly conference on Supercomputing which has been held in Europe
- Inverse Symbolic Calculator
- Internet Systems Consortium, an organization that develops Internet software
  - ISC license, a free software license introduced by the Internet Systems Consortium

== Education ==
- Independent Schools Council, a British organization representing independent schools
- Indian School Certificate, a national level examination for the upper years (Classes XI and XII) of high school
- Information Systems and Controls in the Uniform Certified Public Accountant Examination
- Institut supérieur du commerce de Paris, a French business school
- International School of Carthage, a private school in Tunis, Tunisia
- International School of Curitiba, a school in Curitiba, Brazil
- International Students' Committee, organizers of the St. Gallen Symposium in Switzerland
- International Student Conference, a nonpartisan rival organization to the International Union of Students
- Islamic World Science Citation Database, Iranian regional citation index

== Sports ==
- International Shooto Commission, an international commission of combat sports called MMA
- International Softball Congress, a North American softball tournament organization
- International Speedway Corporation, former auto racing race track owner; merged with NASCAR in 2019
- ISC (sportswear), an Australian sports apparel manufacturer
- International Sportsworld Communicators, the owner of the commercial rights to the World Rally Championship
- Indonesia Soccer Championship, a football league system in Indonesia
  - Indonesia Soccer Championship A, a top-tier league
  - Indonesia Soccer Championship B, a second-tier league

== Other organizations ==
- Indigenous Services Canada
- Infiltration Surveillance Center, the defunct command center for Operation Igloo White in Nakhon Phanom, Thailand
- Intelligence and Security Committee, a committee of the UK Parliament
- International Signal and Control, an American defense contractor
- International Socialist Commission
- International Silver Company, a corporation banding together many existing silver companies in Connecticut
- Information Services Corporation, a publicly traded Canadian multinational company that provides registry and information management services for public data and records
- Kandersteg International Scout Centre, Switzerland
- United States Army Information Systems Command, a predecessor to the United States Army Network Enterprise Technology Command

== Other uses ==
- Internet Scrabble Club, an online Scrabble website
- St Mary's Airport, Isles of Scilly (IATA airport code), an airport in the Isles of Scilly
- International service center, a type of United States Postal Service facility

== See also ==
- ICS (disambiguation)
- ISCC (disambiguation)
- (ISC)² (International Information Systems Security Certification Consortium), a non-profit organization headquartered in Palm Harbor, Florida, US
- ISSC (disambiguation)
