= Grimm–Hoffmann affair =

1917 scandal threatening Swiss neutrality

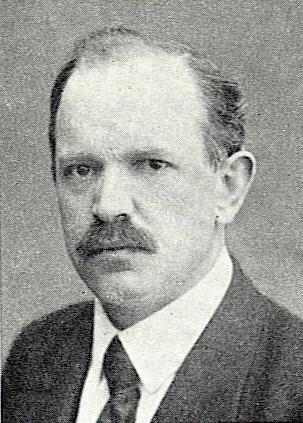
Robert Grimm

The Grimm–Hoffmann affair was a short-lived scandal that threatened Switzerland's neutrality during World War I. Robert Grimm, a socialist politician, travelled to the Russian Republic as an activist to negotiate a separate peace between Russia and the German Empire, in order to end the war on the Eastern Front in the interests of socialism. When the Allies discovered the proposed peace deal, he had to return home. Arthur Hoffmann, the Swiss Federal Councillor who had supported Grimm, had to resign.

== Background ==
In 1917, German troops were divided in fighting the Romanians and Russians on the Eastern Front and British, French and other Allied forces on the Western Front. The Allies insisted that the division of Germany's military strength was crucial to their own success.

During the 1917 February Revolution, Tsar Nicholas II of Russia abdicated his throne, a provisional government was instated. At the time, the Russian Bolshevik leader Vladimir Lenin was living in exile in Switzerland.

Lenin was willing to make peace with Germany regardless of Russia's Triple Entente commitment. Therefore, the Germans assisted in Lenin's return to Russia.

== Grimm's trip to Russia ==
Following the February Revolution, socialist-democratic Swiss National Council (Nationalrat) member and International Socialist Commission Secretary Robert Grimm traveled to Petrograd. Grimm, accompanied by Russian-Jewish-Italian socialist activist Angelica Balabanoff, facilitated the movement of political refugees — most prominently Vladimir Lenin — from Switzerland to Russia via Germany and Sweden. During his trip, Grimm passed through Stockholm, where he secured the passage of "some 250 Russian exiles who were returning home."

Grimm arrived in Petrograd on May 22, 1917. While in Russia, he also intended to weigh the possibility of a separate peace agreement between Russia and the German Empire. In Petrograd, Grimm and Balabanoff were accused by the press of being German agents and working toward a separate peace between Germany and Allied countries.

On May 26/27, 1917, Grimm sent a telegram to Federal Councilor (Bundesrat) and Foreign Affairs Minister Arthur Hoffmann stating that Russia was eager for peace with Germany.

On June 13, 1917, a Swiss envoy informed his superiors that a cable message telegram between Bern and Petrograd sent by Hoffmann was deciphered by the Russian Foreign Ministry. This message indicated a conspiracy by Hoffmann and Grimm to incite separate peace negotiations between Germany and Russia. A translated version of the telegram appeared in The New York Times on June 18, 1917:

I am convinced that Germany and her allies would immediately take up peace negotiations at the wish of Russia's allies. As to what concerns the German war aim, you can read articles in the Norddeutsche Allgemeine Zeitung. There, after consultation with Chancellor Theobald von Bethmann Hollweg, the declaration has been made regarding annexation to the effect that Germany does not desire any increase in her territory or any economic or political expansion.

In the telegram, Hoffmann confirms the improbability of a German offensive attack along the Eastern Front, which would threaten a separate Russian–German peace.

The telegram was leaked to international news sources, causing widespread outrage, especially among the Western powers.

== Switzerland neutrality ==
After the leakage of Hoffmann's telegram, Switzerland's neutrality was greatly called into question. Hoffmann was forced to resign and stated in his letter of resignation that he "strived to negotiate exclusively for the promotion of peace, at the interest of his country." However, Allied Forces saw these actions as explicitly non-neutral, as a separate peace between the German Empire and Russia would strengthen German troops on the Western Front.

France and Great Britain questioned the presence of a silent majority in Switzerland that supported the Central Powers.

== Aftermath ==
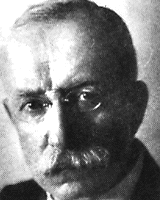
Arthur Hoffmann

On June 18, 1917, the Pan-Russian Congress of all Councils of Workmen's and Soldiers' Delegates officially moved to expel Grimm in a 640–121 vote. By the time of the vote, Grimm had already left Russia.

On June 20, 1917, Grimm resigned as Chairman of the International Socialist Commission (ISC). After appointing new leadership at the Third Zimmerwald Conference, the ISC appointed a commission to investigate the Grimm–Hoffmann affair. Grimm was censured, but ultimately cleared of acting with German imperialistic interests and actively supporting a separate peace. Grimm eventually rebounded from the scandal, going on to become the President of the National Swiss Council in 1946.

Hoffmann, who had not consulted his colleagues over his initiative, retired immediately. In Switzerland, Hoffmann became a controversial figure. Citizens from the western district of Romandy were particularly outraged by the affair. His former business dealings in Germany increased the public's growing suspicion that he was a German sympathizer. However, Hoffmann denied acting out of sympathy with Germany. Many were also surprised by his partnership with Grimm.

Hoffmann was replaced by Gustave Ador, head of the International Red Cross. Ador's succession relieved some tension and restored some trust in the Federal Council.
