= International Socialist Commission =

- Abbreviation: ISC
- Chairperson: Robert Grimm
- Secretary: Angelica Balabanoff
- Founded: September 1915
- Dissolved: March 1919
- Split from: Second International
- Succeeded by: Communist International
- Headquarters: Berne, Switzerland
- Ideology: Socialism; Anti-militarism; Anti-imperialism; Proletarian internationalism
- Political position: Left-wing to Far-left

The International Socialist Commission, also known as the International Socialist Committee or the Berne International, was a coordinating committee of socialists parties that adhered to the idea of the Zimmerwald Conference of 1915.

== Early history ==
The Zimmerwald Conference elected Angelica Balabanoff, Odino Morgari and Charles Naine to the Commission, with the Swiss socialist Robert Grimm as chairman and Balabanoff as interpreter. The Committee was charged with setting up a temporary secretariat and publishing a bulletin. The ISCs initial purpose was to act as an intermediary between the affiliated groups in their struggle for peace. It was not to act as a replacement for the International Socialist Bureau and dissolve as soon as the ISB could begin functioning normally. Other adherents of the Zimmerwald movement, such as Vladimir Lenin, saw it as the beginning of a new International.

The Commissions activity in the first months of its existences consisted of translating the manifesto and resolutions of the conference and distributing them as widely as possible. To that end they first forwarded copies of the first number of their Bulletin to the socialist and trade union papers of the neutral countries. Within the belligerent countries the ISC was able to have the full documents published in Italy, Russia, France, England and Bulgaria but only summaries in Austria and Germany. They also sent a circular to all the parties adhering to the ISB announcing their existence and the objects of the group. Only the Danish party replied, officially disapproving of the Zimmerwald venture. However, at the Congress of the Swiss Socialist Democratic Party at Aarau November 20–21, the delegates declared their adherence to the ISC and granted the organization 300 francs.

On September 27, 1915, ISC sent out a confidential circular (which was nevertheless leaked to the unfriendly press) suggesting that the adhering groups appoint up to three extra delegates to join the Commissioners as part of an Enlarged Committee. The first session of this Enlarged Committee of the International Socialist Commission was held in Berne February 5–8, 1916. No official list of attendees was published and sources disagree about who was present. Fainsod lists the following: Robert Grimm and Fritz Platten from the Swiss Social Democratic Party; Lenin and Zinoviev from the Bolsheviks; Julius Martov and Pavel Axelrod from the Mensheviks; David Riazanov of the Mezhraiontsy (also known as the Inter-District Committee); Feliks Kon and Pawel Lewinson from the Polish Socialist Party - Left; Bertha Thalheimer, Adolf Hoffman and Georg Ledebour, dissidents from the German Social Democratic Party; Serrati, Modigliani and Angelica Balabanoff from the Italian Socialist Party; Christian Rakovsky from the Social Democratic Party of Romania and Edmondo Peluso from the Social Democratic Party of Portugal. However, the Hoover Institution adds Alexander Martynov, for the Mensheviks, Franz Koritschoner, a dissident member of the Social Democratic Party of Austria; Henri Guilbeaux, editor of the Demain; Karl Radek of the Social Democracy of the Kingdom of Poland and Lithuania; and Willi Münzenberg, secretary of the International Socialist Youth League. Furthermore, there was apparently a representative of the Dutch Zimmerwaldists present, or one of the above may have held the Dutch mandate. The identity of this person remains unclear.

After some debate the meeting decided to issue a circular (though not a full manifesto as the Zimmerwald Lefts had advocated) on the basis of a draft written by Grimm and extensively rewritten by a commission consisting of Zinoviev, Rakovsky, Serrati, Martov, Grimm and two delegates representing Germany and the ISC whose identity is not apparent. The Lefts were still not entirely satisfied with the circular, but considered it an improvement over the Zimmerwald Manifesto. The meeting also decided to arrange a new conference, drew up conditions for participation in it and a provisional agenda.

== Kienthal to the Russian Revolution ==
The ISC set to work arranging for a new congress of Zimmerald adherents which met at Kienthal, Switzerland on April 24, 1916. Forty three delegates met at this conference, representing Germany, France, Italy, Russia, Poland, Switzerland, Serbia, Portugal and Great Britain. The ISC publicly announced that the Conference was going to be held in the Netherlands to avoid passport denial or secret police surveillance, but a number of delegates were prevented from attending anyway.

The Kienthal Conference adopted another manifesto and some important resolutions, but it declined to advocate a policy to be followed by its adherents toward the conference of Neutral Socialists scheduled to meet at the Hague that summer. This was deferred to the second meeting of the ISC Enlarged Committee on May 2. Each organization that participated in the Kienthal Conference was represented by one delegate. This meeting "considered some administrative matters, authenticated the Kienthal resolutions, and discussed matters of parliamentary action" as well as the Hague Conference. One group, headed by Martov, advocated participation, arguing that no opportunity should be missed to expose to the workers the "cause of the failure" of the International Socialist Bureau. Zinoviev argued against, claiming it would only confuse the workers. The meeting ultimately became deadlocked, with five votes for each proposition, so it was decided that each party should make up its own mind whether to attend, but they should uphold the Zimmerwald resolutions if they did.

The ISC Enlarged Committee attempted to meet again at Olten on February 1, 1917 to consider a proposed Paris conference of Entente socialist parties. The ISC called a meeting of the Enlarged Committee members of the Allied countries, but only those groups with a presence in Switzerland were able to attend. The meeting therefore, only issued a non-binding declaration recommending its affiliates not to attend. An official list of delegates was, again, not published, but the official communique stated "only those delegates of the three Russian socialist parties, who were in Switzerland - the representatives of the National Committee of the Polish Socialist Party (the Levitsa) and of the Bund, as well as a representative of La Vie Ouvriere in Paris, who resides in Switzerland - came to the conference." The editors of the Hoover Institutions The Bolsheviks and the World War, however, state specifically that the organizations represented included the Bolsheviks, the Mensheviks, and the Russian Social Revolutionaries, as well as Henri Guilbeaux and Willi Münzenberg.

== The Russian Revolution and Stockholm ==
After the March Revolution in Russia the ISC decided to transfer its headquarters to Stockholm, to be closer to the center of revolutionary activity. Grimm left Switzerland on April 20, and arrived at Stockholm on April 24. Three days before he left, however, Grimm had agreed to an appeal of assistance from the Central Committee for the Return of Political Exiles to Russia to intervene on their behalf with the Russian Provisional Government and the Petrograd Soviet for their return to Russia in exchange for German civil prisoners in Russia. However, Grimm was denied entry into Russia for the moment on the suspicion that he was a German spy. In the meantime, Grimm and the ISC learned that several affiliated parties had declared themselves sympathetic to the movement for a general socialist congress at Stockholm and issued an appeal on May 10 to all the European Zimmerwaldist parties to meet in a third Zimmerwaldist conference in Stockholm for May 31 to decide the Zimmerwald movements attitude toward the proposed Stockholm Conference.

A train full of Russia exiles arrived from Switzerland in mid-May, carrying fellow ISC member and interpreter Angelica Balabanoff, as well as Martov, Riazanov, Pavel Axelrod and a number of other Russian socialist luminaries. Grimm boarded this train and set off for the Russian frontier. Before he got to the Russian border he learned that the foreign minister who denied him a visa, Pavel Milyukov had resigned, and three more socialists had entered the Provisional Government. The new government issued him a visa but it did not get to him until after he had crossed the Russian border under the protection of the Helsingfors Soviet. Grimm and Balabanoff arrived in Petrograd in time to speak at the All-Russian Conference of the Menshevik party and convince that organization to approve attending the Third Zimmerwald Conference (they also voted to advocate participation at the proposed Stockholm Congress).

On May 28–29 they had an informal conference with members of Zimmerwaldist parties in the city. According to Balabanoff's notes this was attended by Lenin, Zinoviev and Kamenev of the Bolsheviks; Bobrov of the Social Revolutionaries; Grigorii Bienstock, Martov, Martynov, and Larin of the Mensheviks; Raphael Abramovitch of the Bund; Leon Trotsky, Mikhail Urinovich and Riazanov of the Inter-District Committee; Lapinski of the Polish Socialist Party - Left and Christian Rakovsky of the Romanian Social Democrats. According to her notes Trotsky, Kamenev, Zinoviev, Riazanov and herself were opposed to participation in the purposed Stockholm conference, while Rakovsky, Grimm, Bobrov and Martynov were for attending. In any case, decision would have to wait until the next Zimmerwaldist Conference. The Bolshevik delegation also tried to prevail on the ISC to issue a condemnation of socialists serving as ministers in the Provisional Government. While most at the meeting who gave an opinion were against socialist participation in the Provisional Government, there was also a broad consensus that the ISC did not have the authority to make such a statement without first consulting its affiliates.

== The "Grimm Affair" ==
While in Petrograd both Balabanoff and Grimm were vigorously criticized in the press as being German agents working for a separate peace between Germany and Allied countries. Balabanoff was accused of negotiating with the Germans on behalf the Italian Socialist Party, but the Party quickly cleared her. However, Robert Grimm faced a more substantial charge. On May 26/27 he sent a telegram to Swiss Federal Councilor Arthur Hoffmann stating that there was a general desire for peace in Russia and that the only thing that could hinder it was a German offensive. Hoffmann responded on June 3, stating that people he spoke to in the German government would not launch an offensive while there was still a possibility of peace, as well as comment on possible territorial exchanges involving Poland, Lithuania and Galicia. The Provisional Government published these exchanges on June 16 and ordered Grimm deported. The event caused a scandal and opponents of the Zimmerwaldist movement from many sides used it as evidence that Zimmerwald movement was part of a German conspiracy.

On June 20 Grimm resigned as Chairman of the International Socialist Commission. On the same day Carl Hoglund, acting on behalf of the Swedish Left Social Democratic Party and Youth League, appointed a commission of three to look after the affairs of the ISC -- Zeth Höglund, Ture Nerman and Carl Carlson. The first act of this new leadership was to recall Balabanoff from Russia. She would thenceforth be the secretary of the ISC. The ISC then appointed a commission of inquiry to look into the "Grimm affair". The membership of this commission consisted of Carl Lindhagen and Zeth Höglund of Sweden; Kirkov of Bulgaria; Karl Radek of Poland; Christian Rakovsky of Romania; Orlovsky of Russia; and Karl Moor of Switzerland

The commission found that Grimm had made the telegraphic exchange without the knowledge of Balabanoff or any of the other Zimmerwaldists in Petrograd, and, while condemning him for practicing a kind of secret diplomacy, absolved him of attempting to reach a separate peace with Germany. It also absolved the International Socialist Commission itself, as no other member besides Grimm knew about the telegraphs.

The "affair" also had repercussions in Switzerland. Councilor Hoffman resigned on June 19. When Grimm returned he faced another commission of inquiry, this time appointed by the presidium of the Swiss Social Democratic Party. On September 1, 1917 the presidium voted 18-15 to accept the majority report of the commission, which came to most of the same conclusions as the Stockholm commission and recommended Grimm be restored to his previous party posts. A minority report signed by Charles Naine, Grimms former ISC colleague, was more condemnatory and denied the right of the presidium to restore Grimm to his previous mandates.

== The Third Zimmerwald Conference ==
Meanwhile, the ISC in Stockholm held a meeting at the office of the Stormklocken newspaper on July 3, with representatives of the Soviets to attempt to clarify the situation. Present at this meeting were Linstrom, Lindhagen and Hoglund for Sweden; Olausen for Norway; Otto Lang for Switzerland; Karl Kautsky, Hugo Haase, Luise Zietz, and Oskar Cohn for Germany; Sirola for Finland; Orlovsky, Radek and Hanecki for the Bolsheviks; Boris Reinstein for the US Socialist Labor Party; Kirkov for Bulgaria and Balabanoff in her capacity as secretary of the ISC. The representatives of the Soviet were Goldenberg, Vladimir Rozanov and "Smirnov". At this meeting Balabanoff, Orlavsky and Reinstien stated their objections to the invitation of the majority Socialist parties to the proposed Stockholm conference. Goldberg replied that the proposed conference was open to socialist parties without conditions, and would include minorities as well as majorities. Radek re-emphasized the Bolshevik party's disapproval of the Stockholm Conference and the Party's determination to quit the Zimmerwald movement if the Third Zimmerwald Conference chose to participate. Haase, of the Independent Socialist Party of Germany, however, was for the Conference and stated that his party would attend. Again, Balabanoff reminded everybody that no single party could dictate the ISCs position, which would be decided by the third Zimmerwald Conference. On the next day the conclave resumed, this time without the Soviet delegates. A statement was adopted in the name of the "Bureau of the International Socialist Commission" to the effect that the Third Zimmerwald Conference would take place five days before the proposed general Stockholm Conference, but should the conference not meet by September 15, 1917 the commission was empowered to call a conference of affiliates anyway.

On July 9, once their meetings with the Dutch-Scandinavian Committee (the organization planning the Stockholm conference) were finished, the Soviet delegation tried once again to enlist the ISC in the preparation work for the Stockholm Conference. This meeting, held at the ISCs "quarters" was between Balabanoff, Hoglund and Carlson for the ISC and Hendrik Ehrlich and another representative The Soviet delegation did not get a formal answer until July 11, when the ISC sent them a formal letter stating that they would not be able to participate in the preparations because the Stockholm Conference invitations had been "altered" to include the pro-war socialist parties and that the breaking of the "civil peace" was not a requirement of the parties to the conference

On July 13, according to Fainsod, there was another meeting of the ISC with Zimmerwaldists in Stockholm. Participants reported included Radek, Alexandra Kollontai, Orowski, Martinov and Jermanski of Russia, "Mohr of Switzerland", Sirola of Finland, Storm and Kilborn of Sweden. Radek and Kollantai are supposed to have argued against going to the proposed Stockholm Conference while it was still reiterated that only the Third Zimmerwald Conference could decide that.

On July 18 Balabanoff did issue a revised invitation to the Third Zimmerwald Conference. The invitation gave the date as August 10, 1917 and included a provisional agenda, stated that the condition for participation were the same as those published in Bulletin #3 and also included an invitation to a socialist women's conference to be held in connection with the Zimmerwald conference

On August 1 another meeting of the ISC with Zimmerwald adherents in Stockholm decided to call the Third Zimmerwald Conference and meet in Stockholm on September 5 regardless of what happened to the movement for the proposed general Conference. The participants at this meeting included Lindhagen, Lindstorm, and Otto Strom of Sweden; Osip Arkadievich Ermanski of the Menshiviks; Yrjo Sirola of Finland; J. Eads How of the United States; Ledebour of Germany; and Radek and Hanecki "representing both the Bolsheviks and the Social Democracy of Poland and Lithuania"

Finally, the Third Zimmerwald Conference met at Stockholm on September 5–12, 1917. It had a smaller number of participants than any of the previous Zimmerwaldist Conferences, with only about thirty delegates from Russia, Germany, Poland, Finland, Rumania, Switzerland, the United States, Sweden and Norway, as well as the members of the ISC itself. By this point the question of attending the proposed general Stockholm Conference had been rendered practically moot because of the inability of the organizers to realize the project. The question was discussed anyway because some delegates felt that the issues raised by the movement for the Stockholm Congress were of a "fundamental" nature and the proletarians needed to be educated as to why the proposal foundered. No resolution was passed on the issue, though the movement for the Stockholm Conference is condemned, in passing, in the Conferences manifesto.

== Final months in Stockholm ==
The manifesto itself caused some trouble for the ISC. It was agreed that it would not be immediately released because it contained a call for co-ordinated mass action against the war by the proletarians of all countries. The Conference felt it would be best to postpone publication until all the Zimmerwaldist groups had consented to this. A messenger was to memorize the text in English and go to London where he would deliver the manifesto orally. There it would be translated into French, memorized by another messenger who would travel to Paris. Meanwhile, on September 28, Louise Zeitz of the German Independent Socialists arrived in Stockholm and the ISC met to discuss her request that the publication of the manifesto be postponed further. The ISP had been getting into trouble lately because of mutinies in the German navy led by alleged party members. The group's parliamentary leaders denied responsibility and pleaded that they were only for legal action. The publication of the manifesto at this time might lead to the dissolution of the party by the government. Karl Radek, on the other hand, argued for immediate publication. The Commission decided to postpone issuing the manifesto for the time being. The ISC would publish it only after personal or telegraphic communication with the ISP and, barring that, on its own discretion. Radek threatened to publish the manifesto himself—and he did so, in a Finnish newspaper that November.

The ISC held a meeting with a visiting Serb delegation on October 10. The Serbs were represented by Kaslerovic and Popvic. In addition to the Serbs, the following were present: Christian Rakovsky of Romania; Katerina Tinev of the Bulgarian Trade Union Federation and Kharlokov of the opposition with the "Broad" Bulgarian socialist party; Radek, Orlovsky and Haneki of the Bolsheviks; Yrjo Sirola of Finland and Fritz Rosen of the Socialist Propaganda League of America. No decisions or resolutions appear to have been made at this meeting. The Serb delegation were there to submit a memorandum to the Dutch-Scandinavian committee.

The ISC held two meetings on November 8, 1917, the day after the Bolshevik seizure of power in Petrograd. Present, beside the formal members of the Commission, were Radek, Racovsky, Tinev and Kharlakov. At the first it was moved that the ISC send a telegram of congratulations to the Petrograd Soviet in the name of all the affiliated parties. Racovsky protested against this, suggesting they wait until the situation in Russia was clear and all the parties were able to take a stand on what happened. He was overruled. Radek offered an already written appeal that he wanted issued jointly by the Bolsheviks and the ISC which urged workers around the world to strike and form soviets to defend the Russian revolution from counter-revolution and defend peace. It also asked all the parties which approved of the revolution to send delegates to Stockholm. This was approved. At a second meeting later that night the publication of the manifesto adopted at the Third Zimmerwald Conference was approved.

The ISC spent the remainder of its existence publishing its newsletter and other material supportive of the Bolshevik revolution. In March 1918 its published a special illustrated "Zimmerwald Russia Review", Frieden, Brot, Freiheit in twelve languages. It also published a pamphlet of Bukharin, Thesen über der sozialistische Revolution und die Aufgaben des Proletariats während seiner Diktatur in Russland. The final issue of Nachrichten was published on September 1, 1918 and contained an appeal to the workers in German, French, Swedish, Italian and English. That month Balabanoff went on a tour of several countries to try to revive the influence of the ISC and fight off calls for its return to Switzerland. She was not especially successful, being expelled from Switzerland and denied reentry into Sweden. As secretary of the International Socialist Commission, she consented into its formal dissolution into the Communist International at its first congress in March 1919.

== Conferences ==
- Zimmerwald Conference (1915)
- Kienthal Conference (1916)
- Stockholm Conference (1917)

== Publications ==
=== Periodicals ===
- Bulletin published in German, English and French at Berne
    1. September 21, 1915
    2. November 27, 1915
    3. February 29, 1916
    4. April 22, 1916
    5. July 10, 1916
    6. January 6, 1917
- Nachrichtendientst published in German at Stockholm 44 issues. Some of the more significant of which were:
1. No. 3 May 12, 1917 (announces 3rd Zimmerwald conference)
2. No. 9 June 20, 1917 (announces Grimm resignation and formation of a new ISC)
3. No. 10 June 22, 1917 (announces a commission of inquiry into the Grimm affair; July 3 meeting)
4. No. 13 July 8, 1917 (publishes findings of the above commission)
5. No. 28 November 10, 1917 (publishes Third Conference manifesto; endorses October Revolution)
6. No. 44 September 1, 1918 (final issue)

=== Pamphlets ===
- Das Wiedererwachen der Internationale by Christian Rakovsky Bern: Internationale Sozialistische Kommission, 1916
- Lenin: am Tage nach der Revolution by Fritz Platten Zürich : Genossenschaftsdruckerei, 1918

== Affiliates ==
Two membership lists of organizations adhering to Zimmerwald were published in Bulletins #3 and #4. Not included in either lists were the opposition sections within the German and French socialist parties. Additionally, the Finnish Social Democrats adhered in the summer of 1917. There were also other groups whose allegiance to the ISC and Zimmerwald was ambiguous.

=== Entente countries (other than Russia) ===
- Italian Socialist Party (October 12, 1915)
- Confederazione Generale del Lavoro (Italy)
- American Socialist Party (before December 27, 1915)
- German Speaking group of the Socialist Party of America
- Socialist Labor Party (before December 27, 1915)
- Independent Labour Party
- British Socialist Party
- Social Democratic Party of Romania
- Serbian Social Democratic Party
- Portuguese Socialist Party (before December 27, 1915)
- International Socialist League (South Africa)
- Socialist Workers' Federation (Greece)

=== Czarist Russia ===
- Central Committee of the Russian Social Democratic Workers Party (Bolsheviks)
- Organization Committee of the Russian Social Democratic Labor Party (Mensheviks)
- Socialist Revolutionary Party (Internationalist)
- General Jewish Labour Bund in Lithuania, Poland and Russia
- Polish Socialist Party – Left
- Social Democracy of the Kingdom of Poland and Lithuania
- Lettish Social Democratic Labour Party
- Social Democratic Party of Finland (June 15–18, 1917)
- Ukrainian Social Democrats - Borotbists

=== Neutral countries ===
- Social Democratic Party of Switzerland (November 21, 1915)
- Swedish Social Democratic Youth League
- Young Social Democrats of Norway
- Social Democratic Youth League (Denmark)
- Madrid Socialist Youth
- Revolutionary Socialist League

=== Central Powers ===
- Bulgarian Social Democratic Workers' Party (Narrow Socialists)
- Bulgarian Social Democratic Workers' Party (Broad Socialists)
- Federation of Trade Unions of Bulgaria
- Independent Social Democratic Party of Germany.

== See also ==
- Vienna Socialist Conference of 1915
- Neutral Socialist Conferences during the First World War
