= Neutral Socialist Conferences during the First World War =

During the First World War there were three conferences of the Socialist parties of the non-belligerent countries.

== Lugano, 1914 ==
The first joint meeting of any of the socialist parties after the out break of the war was held by representatives of the Swiss Social Democratic Party and the Italian Socialist Party at Lugano on September 27, 1914. Attendees included Giacinto Menotti Serrati, Angelica Balabanoff, Oddino Morgari, Costantino Lazzari, Filippo Turati, Elia Musatti, Giuseppe Modigliani, Dominico Armuzzi, Giuseppe de Falco, Celestino Ratti for the Italians and Josef Albisser, Mario Ferri, Hermann Greulich, Paul Pfluger, Anton Rimathe, Hans Schenkel, Robert Grimm and Charles Naine for the Swiss Party.

The resolution adopted by the conference declared that the war was caused by "the imperialist policy of the Great Powers", the competition for markets, and the attempt to suppress the proletariat and Social democracy. It claimed that the Central Powers could not claim this as a fight against Czarism to protect high culture, as they suppressed it in their own lands, and that the Entente could not claim to be fighting for self-determination, as the war was not being fought to free the nations from "capitalist oppression" and their Alliance with Russia only increased oppression and hindered the growth of high culture. The resolution further stated that the capitalists had stirred parts of the working class into a chauvinist frenzy and made portions of it believe it was fighting for a noble cause. The conference called on the parties of the neutral countries to demand that their states stay out of the war, and that the war should be brought to a speedy end by diplomatic negotiations.

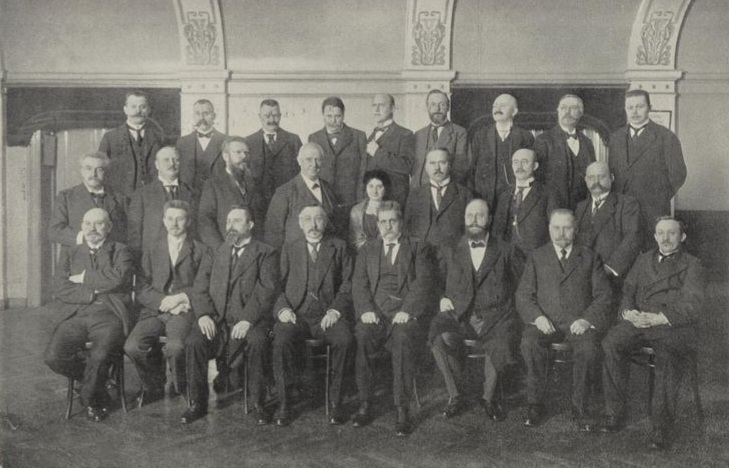
Participants of the 1915 conference

== Copenhagen, 1915 ==
A joint meeting of the socialist parties of the Scandinavian countries was held on October 11 at Stockholm. Hjalmar Branting, Fredrik Ström and Herman Lindquist represented the Swedish Social Democratic Party, Jacob Vidnes, Magnus Nilssen and Ole Lian represented the Labour Party (Norway) and Frederick Borgbjerg, Thorvald Stauning and Carl Madsen for the Danish Social Democrats. Pieter Jelles Troelstra of the Social Democratic Workers' Party (Netherlands) also attended. Among the topics discussed was a proposed by the Dutch that the headquarters of the International Socialist Bureau be moved from occupied Brussels to Amsterdam and its affairs be put in charge of the Dutch party. It was decided that a conference of all the parties affiliated to the ISB should be called to decide on the issue. The French rebuffed this offer, and it was soon decided to call a conference just of the parties of neutral countries. Some time between October 11 and November 1914, the headquarters of the ISB were moved to the Hague and three Dutch members were added to the executive committee with the consent of its secretary, Camille Huysmans, and all the other affiliated parties, with the exception of the French.

Meanwhile, attempts to line up delegations from other neutral countries were not very successful. The proposed program of the conference, which excluded discussion of the causes of the war and the standpoints of the belligerents alienated the Spanish Socialist Workers' Party, who declined to attend. The Swiss party was more intent on a conference along the lines of the Lugano resolution, and by December 19 they had decided not to attend. When Hilquit learned that the scope of the conference had narrowed down to four countries in a "localized" region of Europe, he felt the US would be out of place there and decided not to attend. The Italian Modigliani did not attend "rather from accident than for any other reason", according to Angelica Balabanov.

When the conference did finally assemble on January 17–18, 1915, it consisted of sixteen delegates, four from the Netherlands (Troelsta, Henri van Kol, Vliegen and Wibaut) and four each from the Scandinavian countries (at least: Sweden – Branting; Denmark – Staunding and Borgbjerg; Norway – Nilssen and Ole Z. Lian). The representatives of the Jewish Bund and the editor of Het Volk, the central Dutch organ were admitted as guests. Greetings or declarations were received by the conference from the French Socialist Party, Social Democratic Party of Germany, Swiss Social Democratic Party, the Italian Socialist Party, the Independent Labour Party, the Central Committee of the Russian Social Democratic Labor Party (Bolsheviks), the Organization Committee of the Russian Social Democratic Labor Party (Menshevik), the Nasha Zarya group (who submitted a report advocating German victory), Camille Huysmans (who claimed he could not attend because the Germans would not grant him a passport), several Swedish trade unions and Bund.

The conferences main resolution was drafted by a commission of Stauning, Troelsta, Nilssen and Branting. It blamed capitalism "in its imperialist form", growth of armaments, secret diplomacy and expansionism as the cause of the war. Recalling the resolution passed at the 1910 Copenhagen Congress, it called on socialist parliamentarians to struggle for the introduction compulsory arbitration courts for international disputes; reduction of armaments, with complete disarmament as the ultimate aim; abolition of secret diplomacy, making foreign affairs a parliamentary responsibility; and recognition of the right of national self-determination. It further suggested that socialist parties should elaborate peace terms that would not be the basis for a future war, called for a full meeting of the International Socialist Bureau "as soon as is deemed convenient", and a full congress of the international at the time of the peace negotiations. Finally they reminded the workers that the world war was only possible because the capitalists were in control of the governments and "consequently, the conference urges the laboring class to make every effort to seize political power in order that imperialism may be crushed and international Social Democracy may accomplish its mission of emancipating the peoples." The conference also passed resolutions urging the parties in neutral countries to persuade their governments to offer their services to mediate an end to the war and protesting the arrest of socialist members of the Fourth Duma.

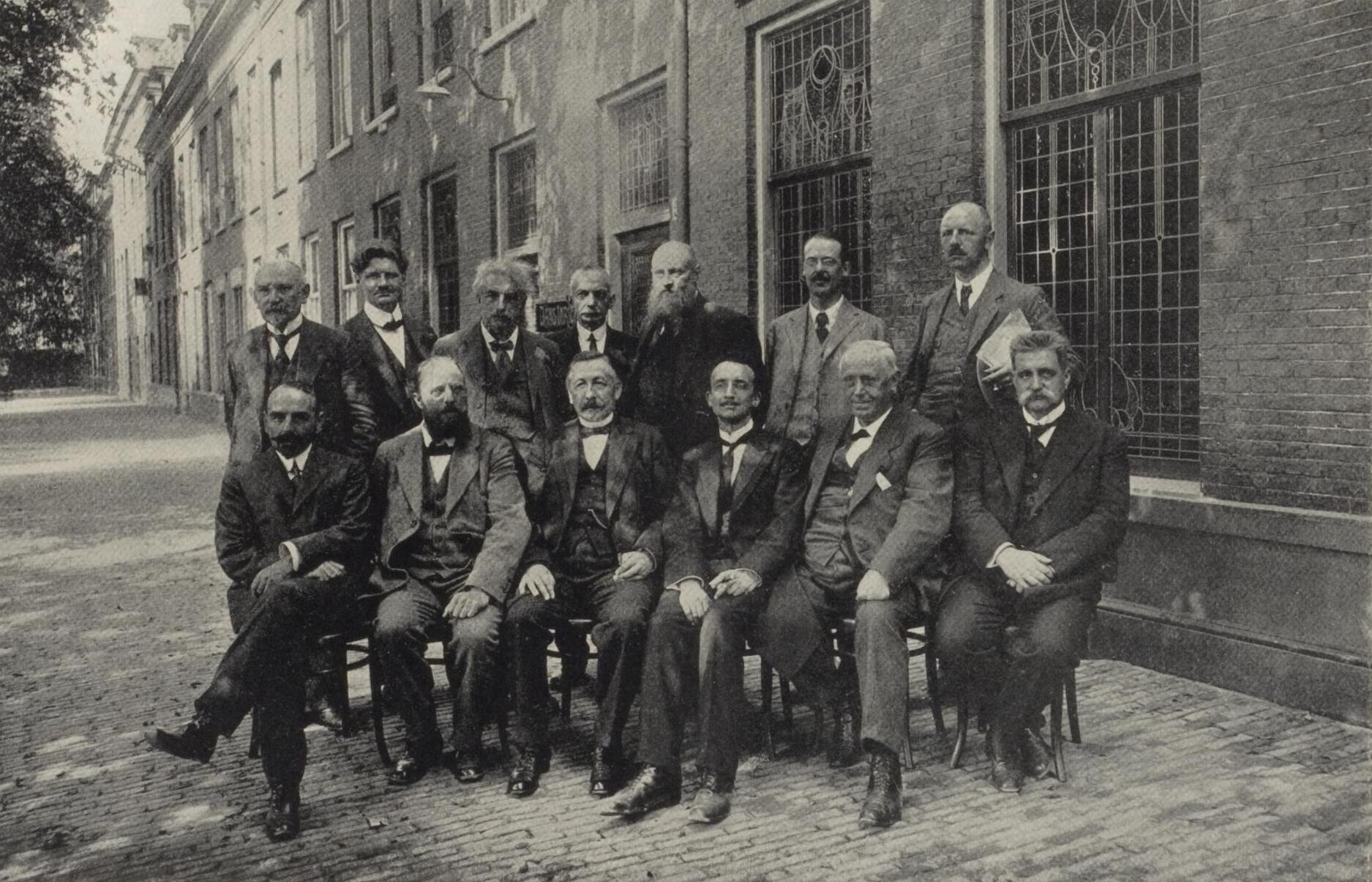
Participants of the 1916 conference

== Hague, 1916 ==
After the Zimmerwald Conference, the International Socialist Bureau arranged to have a meeting of socialist from neutral countries convene under its auspices. Originally scheduled for June 26, 1916, it finally met at the Hague on July 31. The conference was attended by nine delegates: Argentina- Nicolás Repetto; Denmark- Thorvald Staunning; the Netherlands- Troelstra. Albarda, van Kol, Wibaut, Vliegen, Jan van Zutphen, Edo Fimmen and H.J. Bruens; Sweden- Hjamar Branting; and the United States-- Algernon Lee. Representatives from Norway, Switzerland and Luxemburg tried to attend but the German authorities would not allow them to pass through their territory to get to the Netherlands. Vladimir Lenin and Alexandra Kollontai, a Bolshevik residing in Norway had attempted to get a Zimmerwald Left representative from Norway sent to the conference, possibly Martin Tranmæl. Other delegates from the Social Democratic Youth League, the Social Democratic Party of Romania and the Netherlands who might have been sympathetic to the Zimmerwald Left were also prevented from attending for various reasons. The conference adopted resolutions declaring capitalism to be the cause of the war; condemned "economic warfare"; advocated free trade; declared that the conditions were right for peace negotiations to begin on the basis of national self-determination; for the re-establishment of Belgium and Serbia; autonomy for Poland; and negotiations between German and French socialists on the Alsace Lorraine question. The conference also protested the jailing of Karl Liebknecht and the execution of Battisti. Finally it approved of the work of the executive committee efforts to re-establish relations between the various parties and favor the early convening of the full International Socialist Bureau.

== See also ==
- Inter-Allied Socialist Conferences of World War I
- Vienna Socialist Conference of 1915
