= Oskar Cohn =

German Zionist and socialist politician

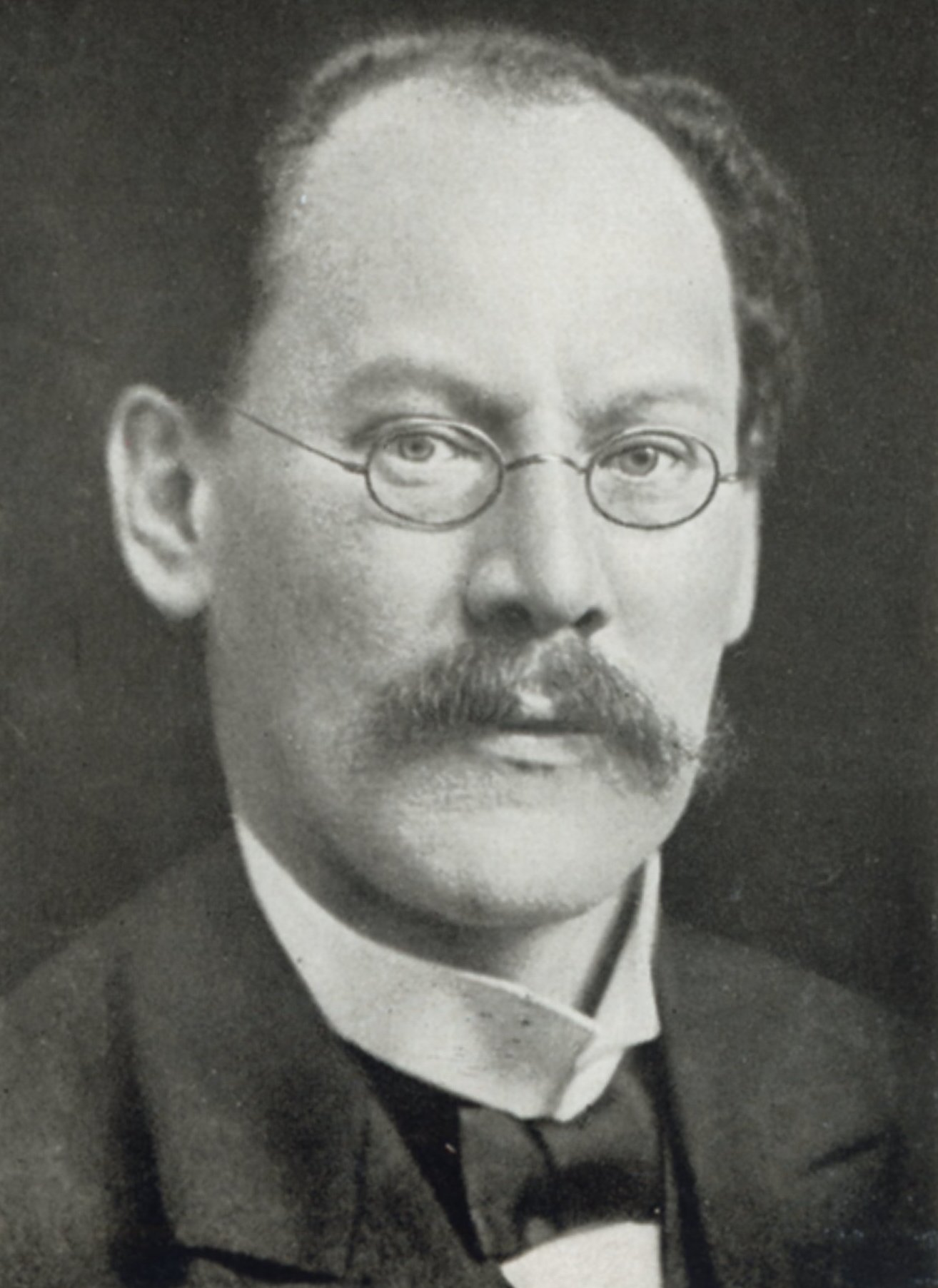

Member of the Berlin City council
- In office 1909–1921
- Constituency: Berlin-Tiergarten

Member of the Reichstag (German Empire)
- In office 1912–1918
- Constituency: Erfurt 1, Nordhausen

Member of the Weimar National Assembly
- In office 1919–1920

Member of the Prussian House of Representatives
- In office 1919–1924

Personal details
- Born: 15 October 1869 Guttentag, Silesia, Kingdom of Prussia (Dobrodzień, Poland)
- Died: 31 October 1934 (aged 65) Geneva, Switzerland
- Party: SPD (before 1917, after 1922); USPD (1917–1922)
- Other political affiliations: SAG (1915–1917)
- Spouse: Sophie Cohn (–1922)
- Children: Reinhold Cohn, Eva Cohn
- Occupation: Lawyer

Oskar Cohn (15 October 1869 – 31 October 1934) was a German lawyer, Zionist and socialist politician. He was a member of the German and Prussian parliament and the Weimar National Assembly representing the Social Democratic Party of Germany and the Independent Social Democratic Party of Germany.

== Early life and education ==
Cohn was born in Guttentag, Silesia, Kingdom of Prussia (Dobrodzień, Poland), the eleventh child of Bernhard Cohn (1827–1903) and Charlotte née Dresdner (1831–1908). His family were religious but largely assimilated German Jews, his grandfather was an honorary citizen of Guttentag. He attended school in Brieg (Brzeg) and started to study medicine at the Friedrich Wilhelm University of Berlin. After two semesters he switched his studies to law and continued at the University of Greifswald, at the Ludwig-Maximilians-Universität München, and again at the Friedrich Wilhelm University of Berlin. As a student, he came in contact with Otto Landsberg and Wilhelm Liebknecht.

== Career ==
In 1892, Cohn obtained his doctorate and served in the Prussian Army in 1892/93. In 1897, he started to practise as a lawyer in Berlin and joined the law-office of Karl and Theodor Liebknecht in 1899; as a lawyer working in Berlin, Cohn also co-operated with Wolfgang Heine. In 1909, he became a member of Berlin's city council for the Tiergarten district for the Social Democratic Party of Germany (SPD). In 1912 Cohn was elected a member of the German Reichstag representing Nordhausen.

In World War I Cohn served as a guard in prisoner of war camps in Alsace, Guben, Lithuania, and Courland from April 1915 to June 1917; during this time he had his first significant contact with Eastern European Jewry.

Cohn was regularly exempted from military service to take part in Reichstag sessions. When news about the Tel Aviv and Jaffa deportation reached Berlin, Cohn brought up the issue in the Reichstag on 7 May 1917. On 14 May he applied a parliamentary interpellation to intervene in the policy of Djemal Pasha in Palestine. The deportations were finally stopped by Erich von Falkenhayn.

Cohn joined the Independent Social Democratic Party of Germany (USPD) in 1917 and was a member of the USPD delegation at the Stockholm Peace Conference of June 1917. Along with Hugo Haase, Karl Kautsky, and Luise Zietz, he met Angelica Balabanoff and the Russian delegation on 3 July 1917. Here in Stockholm he also came in contact with Ber Borochov and the Poale Zion movement.

After the restoration of diplomatic relations between Germany and Russia, Cohn became legal advisor of the Russian delegation in Berlin. In early November 1918, the Russian delegation was expelled on charges of preparing a Communist uprising in Germany. On the night of 5 to 6 November, Adolph Joffe, the Russian ambassador in Berlin, rendered him about 1 million Mark and a 10.5 million Russian ruble mandate for a bank account at Mendelssohn & Co. After the delegation returned to Russia, Joffe claimed to have paid this money to the USPD to support the revolutionary activities and to purchase weapons.

While the leading USPD politicians Hugo Haase and Emil Barth denied the payment, Cohn admitted the receipt and regretted that he was not able yet to spend the complete sum to spread the idea of the revolution. He explicitly denied receiving the money to acquire weapons; instead he had used most of the cash money to support employees of the embassy and Russian nationals in Germany. Because he could not use the bank account for formal reasons (the Mendelssohn bank refused the mandate), only 50,000 Mark were used to support a socialist uprising in Germany.

Cohn also justified the receipt because the SPD had provided money to Russian socialists in the 1905 Russian Revolution in a similar way. He was however criticised, also by socialist newspapers like Die Freiheit and Vorwärts, because his actions stood in contrast to a USPD party resolution, which ruled out the acceptance of foreign money for revolutionary purposes. These payments led to the demission of Wilhelm Solf as German minister of foreign affairs, who refused further cooperation with the USPD. Later on they were regularly used to discredit Cohn publicly—for instance the nationalist politician Karl Helfferich refused to answer any question asked by Cohn in a Reichstag investigatory committee.

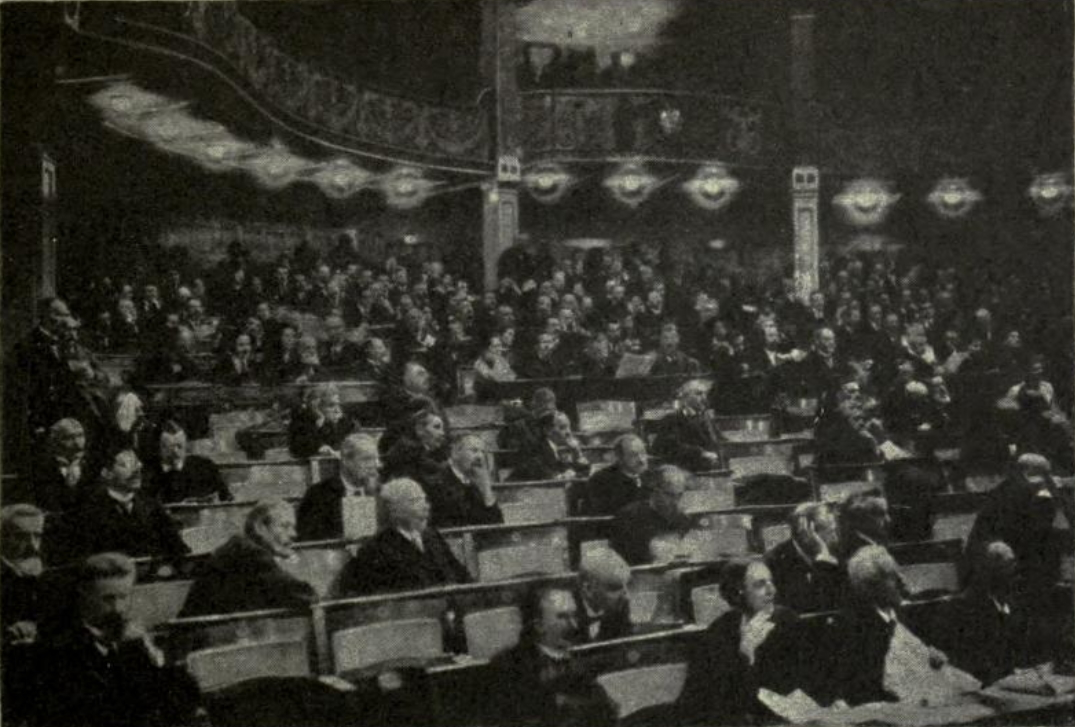
Weimar National Assembly, Cohn standing on the far left

After the November Revolution, Cohn became undersecretary in the Reich Ministry of Justice. In January 1919, Cohn was elected a member of the Weimar National Assembly. His motions to replace the term "Reich" by "Republic" and to address German Jews as a national minority in the Weimar Constitution were denied by the Assembly.

In November 1919, Cohn became a member of the so-called "Schücking Commission", an official commission to investigate Allied allegations of illegal treatment of prisoners of war in Germany, named after its chairman Walther Schücking. In the case of Charles Fryatt, who had been executed by German authorities in 1916, Cohn and Eduard Bernstein dissented from the commission's verdict and publicly declared that they regarded the execution as a severe infringement of international law and an "inexcusable judicial murder".

From 1920 on, he represented Poale Zion in the Jewish community of Berlin, especially advocating the equal status of eastern european Jewish immigrants. In 1922 Cohn re-joined the SPD; he left politics in 1924 and focused on religious affairs in Berlin. He continued to work as a lawyer in Berlin and became a member of the German League for Human Rights.

Cohn managed to escape from Berlin the day after the Reichstag fire of February 1933. He moved to Paris where he worked for the Hebrew Immigrant Aid Society (HICEM). In August 1934, Cohn took part in a conference of the World Jewish Congress in Geneva. While in Switzerland, he was diagnosed with lung cancer. He died in Geneva and was buried in Degania Alef, a kibbutz in northern Israel. The funeral orations were given by Zionists Nahum Goldmann and Yosef Sprinzak.

== Remembrance ==
The Oskar-Cohn-Straße in Nordhausen is named in his honour. In 1934 Arnold Zweig reported the "Oskar-Cohn-library" in Neve Haim, the library however does not exist anymore, its fate is unknown.
