= Bob Grim =

Robert or Bob Grim may refer to:

- Bob Grim (baseball) (1930–1996), Major League Baseball player
- Bob Grim (American football) (born 1945), American football player
- Bobby Grim (1924–1995), American racecar driver

== See also ==
- Bob Grimm, guitarist with The Four Seasons
- Robert Grimm (1881–1958), Swiss Socialist politician
