= Inter-Allied Socialist Conferences of World War I =

During the First World War there were a number of conferences of the socialist parties of the Entente or Allied powers.

== London, February 1915 ==
The first conference was held in London 14 February 1915. The official minutes were not published, but among the approximately 40 delegates were representatives from the Independent Labour Party (Keir Hardie, Ramsay MacDonald, Bruce Glasier and William Anderson), British Socialist Party, Fabian Society, Labour Party; the Belgian Workers Party (Emile Vandervelde, Camille Huysmans and Henri La Fontaine); the French Section of the Workers' International and the General Confederation of Labour – Marcel Sembat, Jean Longuet, Édouard Vaillant, Albert Thomas, Adéodat Compère-Morel, Léon Jouhaux, Alphonse Merrheim and others; from the Russian Empire: Socialist Revolutionary Party – Rubanovich, Viktor Chernov, Bobrov, Central Committee of the Russian Social Democratic Labor Party – Maxim Litvinov, Organization Committee of the Russian Social Democratic Labor Party – Ivan Maisky

The ILP had tried to include the German and Austrian parties, but the French said they would not allow it. This conference was initiated by Vandervelde and presided over by Keir Hardie. Both Litvinov and Maisky attempted to attend the conference and transmit declarations. Litvinov was unable to finish reading his at the conference, but he was subsequently able to have it published in the March 1915 issue of the Socialist Standard of the Socialist Party of Great Britain Reports were made by Vailant, Vandervelde and one of the Social Revolutionaries enthusiastically supporting the war. The British apparently abstained from making a report. There was apparently much debate in the drafting commission and the subsequent plenary session on the war responsibility of the Central Powers and the position of Belgium and Serbia. The Belgian and French delegates are reported as taking a harder line on this point than their British comrades. The attitude of the Russians is difficult to ascertain because of contradicting primary sources.

The resolution adopted by the conference claimed that the war was the product of the antagonisms produced by capitalist society, imperialism and colonial rivalry in which every country had a share of responsibility. Given the invasion of Belgium and France, a victory in the war for Germany would extinguish liberty, national independence and faith in treaties. Therefore, the workers of the Allied countries are fighting a defensive war against the German and Austrian governments, not against the German and Austrian people, and would resist attempts to turn this into a war of conquests. The resolution specifically demanded the restoration of Belgium, autonomy or independence for Poland, and the resolution of all the national problems of Europe from Alsace-Lorraine to the Balkans on the basis of national self-determination. After the war they hoped from an end to secret diplomacy, the "interest of armaments makers" and international compulsory arbitration.

The victory of the Allied Powers must be a victory for popular liberty, for unity, for independence, and autonomy of nations in the peaceful federation of the United States of Europe and the world

At the end of the resolution the conference condemned the repression against socialist newspapers and parliamentarians in Russia, as well as the national oppression of Finns, Jews and Russian and German Poles.

== Paris, March 1917 (canceled) ==
The French Socialist party called for another meeting of the Entente socialists on 7 August 1916 by a vote of 1,937 to 2, 997 not voting. The purpose of the conference was to focus opinion against annexation and conquest, for the establishment of international agreements for the maintenance of peace after the war and for an economic policy that would not be based on exploitation or contain the germs of a new war. The proposal was endorsed by the executive committee of the International Socialist Bureau and votes were to be allotted according to the Second Internationals formula. The proposed conference was set to meet in Paris in March 1917. The organizers of the conference began to have second thoughts, though, when they saw that anti-war socialists might predominate at the conference. They decided to give one of the British Socialist Parties four votes to Henry Hyndmans National Socialist Party and one of the Italian Socialist Party's votes to Benito Mussolinis Fascio. The Italian party then withdrew its decision to participate and called on the International Socialist Commission to give its opinion of the purposed conference. The ISC was for abstaining, but felt it would be useful to call a conference of Entente Zimmerwaldists in order to outline a common policy toward the Paris conference. However, only exile groups in Switzerland, the Bolsheviks, Mensheviks, Socialist Revolutionaries, Polish Socialist Party – Left, General Jewish Labour Bund and the group around Vie Ouvrere were able to attend, and they had already declared their opposition to the conference. The meeting of Zimmerwaldists adopted a non-binding resolution recommending abstinence from the Paris conference. The ILP and BSP were still willing, but when the British Labour Party decided to withdraw a few days before the conference was to open, the meeting was cancelled.

== London, Aug. 1917 ==
The second London conference of Entente socialists was called by the British Labour Party in May 1917 in response to calls began for the convocation of a general socialist congress at Stockholm. After the Council of Soviets had joined the call for the purposed Stockholm conference and made a tour of Allied capitals to make the case, the necessity of convening an Inter-Allied Socialist Conference before the Stockholm one was seated became more imperative, and the final date was set at a meeting of representatives of the French Socialist Party, the British Labour Party and the Soviets at a meeting in Paris on 20–30 July.

The Second Inter-Allied Socialist Conference took place in London 28–29 August 1917. Britain was represented by 41 delegates, France by 12, Russia and Italy 4 apiece, Belgium and Portugal 2 apiece and Greece and South Africa by 1 each. Votes were allotted according to the Second Internationals precedent: France, Great Britain and Russia each had 20 votes, Belgium 12, Italy 10, Portugal 2, Greece and South Africa 1 each. No full membership list seems to be available, but some of the known delegates included Emile Vandervelde and Louis de Brouckere of Belgium, Felicia Scratcherd for Greece, Pierre Renaudel, Albert Thomas, Edgard Milhaud, Poisson, Bracke and L. Dubreuilh, and Arthur Henderson, Ramsay MacDonald, Henry Hyndman, Sidney Webb, Hunter Watts, Frederick Gorle, J. Jones and Bernard Shaw.

Two commissions were elected at the conference, one on the purposed Stockholm congress, the other Allied war aims. The commissions met early the next day and presented their reports to the conference that afternoon. The commission on Stockholm could not come to a unanimous decision, but the majority report as presented by Ramsay MacDonald which welcomed the convening of the Stockholm conference and particularly supported the seating of minorities. On a motion by Bernard Shaw this was amended to include a condemnation of the refusal of passports by the Allied governments. This resolution, as amended, passed 48–13, with the Belgian, South African and Greek delegates voting against and the British Trades Union Congress and the majority French socialists not voting.

The report of the commission on war aims presented by Sidney Webb simply stated that no unanimity could be reached as the commission was presented with six or seven different statements on war aims: a Franco-Belgian statement, a Russian statement, a Portuguese statement, one from the British Socialist Party, a Labour Party statement with an additional memorandum by the ILP and statements of the Italians. The commission recommended that the conference appoint a standing committee of Allied Socialist Parties with a view to arranging another conference. This decision was narrowly approved by the majority of the conference, with each country being allowed two representatives. The second commission also suggested sending either a deputation or a letter to President Woodrow Wilson, but this was withdrawn after strong opposition. There was also a suggestion that the congress be allowed to continue a third day but the conference divided equally on the proposal 21–21 and the chair ruled the proposal not carried.

== London, February 1918 ==
Discussion among the Entente socialist parties on war aims continued through February 1918. The issue was tackled in party conferences, memorandums, and informal talks. On 20 September, the Blackpool congress of the British TUC passed a resolution stating that the Stockholm conference would not be successful at this time, but called on their Parliamentary Committee to take steps for an agreement on war aims among the allied workers and that an eventual general congress should be called on the basis of the agreed war aims. A sub-committee of the Parliamentary Committee and the Labour Party executive met and worked out a memorandum of war aims which was ratified at a meeting of societies affiliated with the TUC and Labour Party in London on 28 December 1917 and presented to Prime Minister David Lloyd George. War aims statements then made by the Prime Minister and President Wilson were approved "as far as they agreed with the memorandum" by the Nottingham conference of the Labour Party on 23 January 1918 which also urged the convening of another Inter-Allied conference and an eventual general conference to assemble in a neutral country, preferably Switzerland.

The French, meanwhile, corresponded with Henderson on the question of future conferences and based their peace term on the answers to the Dutch-Scandinavian questionnaire and the declaration of the first Inter-Allied conference. At the Nottingham conference, Paul Reynauld informally agreed that the draft memorandum on peace terms would be submitted to the National Council of the French Party and CGT on 17 February, and that continuous talks on the details of the memorandum should continue in Paris. He also stated that the Belgian Party would be able to adhere to the main lines of the memorandum and every effort should be used to secure the concurrence of other allied labor groups.

The conference met in London from 20 to 24 February 1918. The organizations represented at the conference included: the British Labour Party and Trade Union Congress; the Belgian Workers Party; the French Socialist Party – SFIO and General Confederation of Labor; Italian Reformist Socialist Party and Italian Socialist Party. Consultative delegates were present from South Africa, Romania and the "South Slav organizations". Messages of support came in from groups in New Zealand, Portugal, Romania, South Africa and the Russian Social Revolutionary Party. Camille Huysmans read a communication from delegates of the Menshevik and Social Revolutionary Parties stating that they had been refused passports by the Bolshevik government.

The conference was opened by J. W. Ogden of the TUC Parliamentary committee. At the opening session Albert Thomas announced that the French Party and C.G.T. had endorsed the British draft memorandum almost unanimously. Capeta, on behalf of the Italian reformists, stated that he had held informal talks with the Yugoslav delegation and they had come to an agreement over amendments to the memorandum affecting their frontiers. The conference formed five commissions: on a League of Nations (Renaudel, chairman, MacDonald, secretary); Territories (Sidney Webb, Jean Longuet, ditto); Publicity and Drafting (Thomas, G. H. Stuart-Bunning, ditto); the International Conference (Henderson, de Brouckere) and Economic conditions (J.H. Thomas).

The conference adopted a detailed memorandum on war aims. After endorsing and quoting in full the resolution of the first Inter-Allied Socialist conference, the memorandum planned post war from a "supernational authority" in the form of a League of Nations, which would have the power to enforce the decisions of a World Court regarding international disputes and conduct elections for the purpose of national self-determination. There would also be an International Legislature in which each "civilised state would have their allotted share" that would pass binding international law. This implied a complete democratisation of all existing states including removal of "arbitrary powers", elected parliaments, publication of all treaties, abolition of secret diplomacy and the responsibility of foreign policy to the legislature. Other elements included the abolition of compulsory military service in all countries, concerted disarmament and the nationalization of defense industries.

A long list of specific territorial goals was also drawn up, including the restoration of Belgium, the settlement of the question of Alsace-Loraine by popular vote, a Balkan Federation, settlement of the differences between Italy on the basis of mutual respect and popular sovereignty and restoration of Poland. Palestine was to be put under temporary international control and opened to Jewish immigration, the other former Turkish territory and Africa "north of the Zambezi and south of the Sahara" were likewise to by international protectorates until their populations were ready for self-government and the Dardanelles made a neutral zone.

The memorandum finally called for a halt to economic warfare and protectionism, while also recognizing the right of countries to create their own trade laws, international action to prevent famine and other dislocations caused by the end of the war, restitution for victims of the war and punishment of war crimes. The final portion of the memorandum included a call for a new general conference of labor and socialist parties of all countries to be held concurrently with the peace conference and for the representation of labor at the peace conference.

== London, Sept. 1918 ==
The final conference met in London 17–19 September 1918. The credentials committee received 86 credentials, 74 of which were accepted as full delegates. The conference was pointedly billed as a Socialist and Labor Conference, allowing Pure and Simple trades unions like the AFL and TLC to take part. Delegates came from a variety of countries, some of which had not been represented at war time socialist conferences yet. Serbia was represented by Dušan A. Popović of the Serbian Social Democratic Party; Greece by Petridis of the General Labor Federation of Piraeus; from the United States, representing the American Federation of Labor were Samuel Gompers, John P. Frey, William Bowen, Edgar Wallace and Charles Baine; the Trades and Labour Congress of Canada sent a single delegate; Romania and Transylvania were represented by a "National committee" which appointed two delegates whom the credentials committee gave consultative status; the Italians were represented by three delegates from the Socialist Union, one from Italian Union of Labor and five from the Democratia Sociale Irredenta, a group of pro-Allied Italian socialists in Austrian Tyrol, who were given consultative status; Great Britain had the largest delegations, with 24 delegates from the Labour Party and 18 from the Trade Union Congress, including Ramsay MacDonald, Sidney Webb, Arthur Henderson; France supplied six each from the SFIO and the CGT; there were six representatives of the Belgian Workers Party and two from the Union of Belgian Workers in France, which included Huysmans, de Broukere and Vandervelde. The status of the Russian delegation was the subject of some dispute on the first day of the conference. Some believed that those delegates, should they arrive, not be seated because Russia had left the Allies, while others believed that no Russian party should be seated because knowledge of conditions there was so unreliable. In any case the Soviet authorities would not let the representatives of the Mensheviks or Social Revolutionaries attend the conference but two communications were received, one from Roubanovich, the other from Axelrod, Gavronsky, Rousanoff and Soukholine. Alexander Kerensky was seated as a "guest".

The first day was taken up with electing commissions. First were the credential and procedures commissions, which reported that day and then commissions on war aims, international relations and for drafting a final statement were elected. There was some debate over what method of voting would be used, Longuet objecting to the use of the allotment used in Socialist congresses because of the absence of the American Socialist Party as well as the official Italian party and CGT, but the issue was not resolved. The second day was taken up largely with the presentation of British and American draft war aims proposals and introduction of resolutions to be sent to the various commissions.

The third meeting received the reports of the commission on international relations. A report on the Peace Note was adopted unanimously, albeit after reservations were made by several delegates. The report on the situation in Russia was more controversial. Two reports came out of the commission, both of which condemned the Treaty of Brest-Litovsk and asked the post war peace conference to "secure the complete freedom of the Russian people", however the majority report condemned the Allied intervention, while the minority supported it. The minority report was signed by two Americans, Blaine and Wallace, while the majority was signed by Henderson, Hill, Huysmans, Vandervelde, Longuet, Renaudel, Rosoni, Rossetti and Popovitch. Debate on this raged through the afternoon session of 19 September, and included a speech by Kerensky in which he pleaded for western socialists to support the anti-Bolshevik governments in Russia. It was finally decided to send the matter back to the committee. On the final day of the conference a compromise resolution was turned in, repeating the first two paragraphs of both resolutions and adding a new third paragraph which stated that the allied intervention should be carried out in conformity with article 6 of the 14 points and should have as its object only the restoration of peace and democracy to Russia. This compromise resolution passed 25–20, on a show of hands. Popovitch and Longuet attempted to deliver statements on their opposition to the resolution, but were overruled. This led to great consternation on the part of the French delegates who then demanded that voting be on the basis of former Socialist conferences with the US awarded 20 votes. It was decided that if any delegate objected to a vote by a show of hands, they would use the former system.

The commission on war aims adopted a statement that combined elements of the British and American proposals and the fourteen points. There was opposition to this report by Popovitch and Kneeshaw, who did not regard the war necessarily as one between freedom and despotism, and two amendments were offered to change the wording over the circumstances in which they would meet representatives of the German SPD, both of which were voted down. On the final vote of the war aims statement was then held

FOR the full text

- Italy....7
- Belgium.12
- France..18
- Britain.20

Total..57

Against the full text

- Serbia....7
- Greece...12
- France....2

Total..10

Abstaining

- American Federation of Labor
- Trades and Labour Congress of Canada

== See also ==
- Vienna Socialist Conference of 1915
- Neutral Socialist Conferences during the First World War
