= Minna Reichert =

German politician (1869–1946)

Minna Reichert (born Minna Fettke: 22 September 1869 – 3 April 1946) was a German peace activist and female politician of the Social Democratic Party of Germany, the Independent Social Democratic Party of Germany and the Communist Party of Germany. In 1920/21 she sat as a member of the Prussian assembly, the precursor body of the Prussian regional legislature ("Landtag").

== Life ==
Minna Fettke was born into a working-class family in Nieder Bielau, now called Bielawa Dolna in Poland. At the time of her birth the village was in the Prussian Province of Silesia.

Sources accessed are silent on her early years, but by 1907, when she was identified as Minna Reichert (housewife) living in Berlin, it is evident that she had married. She was active as a member of the Berlin SPD Women's Association ("Sozialdemokratische Frauenverein") and employed, in Berlin's Electoral District 6, as a party official from 1906. Between 1914 and 1917 she was a member of the regional party executive for the Greater Berlin region.

The decision of the party leadership to enter into what amounted to a political truce in the Reichstag for the duration of the First World War encountered opposition from within the party from the outset. Minna Reichert was an active member of the party's "peace" faction. In September 1915 she participated in the international Zimmerwald Conference which condemned the imperialism of the "capitalist classes" responsible for the war. Two years later, when the German Social Democratic party finally broke apart over the issue of continued support for funding the war, Reichert was one of those who broke away to form the Independent Social Democratic Party ("Unabhängige Sozialdemokratische Partei Deutschlands" / USPD). Between 1919 and 1920 she was a member of the new party's national women's committee. Between October and December 1920 she was a member of the party's central control commission.

As the USPD itself broke apart at the end of 1920 she campaigned for a merger with the newly created Communist Party of Germany, and she was part of the left-wing USPD majority that joined the Communists. During 1920 and 1921 she was a member of the Prussian assembly, mandated to create a post-imperial constitution for the "Prussian Free State", taking the seat vacated by her party colleague Kurt Rosenfeld when he was elected to the national parliament ("Reichstag"). In 1921 she became regional party secretary for Halle-Merseburg. Here she was given responsibility for the "women's work" section. She no longer sought election to the Prussian regional legislature ("Landtag"), but she was a member of the provincial legislature ("Provinziallandtag") for Saxony. Along with her fellow communist, Hedwig Machlitt from Eisleben, in 1921 she was one of the first two women ever to be elected to the Saxon Provinziallandtag.

Minna Reichert was widowed in 1926 and moved back to Berlin. She continued to work for the national Communist Party Central Committee till 1933 as a party advisor and instructor.

After the Second World War she lived in Berlin-Heiligensee. Minna Reichert died in Berlin on 3 April 1946.
