= ISSC (disambiguation) =

ISSC stands for the International Social Science Council, a non-governmental organization set up by the United Nations.

ISSC may also refer to:

== Education ==
- Interdisciplinary School of Scientific Computing, at the University of Pune, India
- Instituto Salesiano Student Council, at the Instituto Salesiano, Macau

== Business ==
- Isles of Scilly Steamship Company, a UK transportation company
- Integrated Systems Solution Corporation, an IBM computer services subsidiary, precursor of IBM Global Services
- ISSC Technologies, a Taiwan-based developer of Bluetooth system on chip solutions, acquired in 2014 cby Microchip Technology#ISSC Technologies

== Others ==
- Interstate Shellfish Sanitation Conference, a US federal organization
- International Super Sportscar Circuit, at Rockingham Motor Speedway, UK
- The Informatics and Statistics Science Collaboration of the Large Synoptic Survey Telescope
- U.S. Army Information Systems Software Center, a former center in the United States Army Communications-Electronics Command

== See also ==
- ISCC (disambiguation)
- ISC (disambiguation)
- International Solid-State Circuits Conference (ISSCC)
