= ISCC =

ISCC may refer to:

- Integrated solar combined cycle, a form of electric power generation, see Combined cycle #Integrated solar combined cycle (ISCC)
- Inter-Service Chess Championship, a chess tournament sponsored by the United States Department of Defense, see United States Armed Forces Chess Championship #Inter-Service Chess Championship
- Inter-Society Color Council, a US trade organization
- Islamic Supreme Council of Canada, based in Calgary, Alberta
- IEEE Symposium on Computers and Communications, held by the IEEE Communications Society
- Invasive Species Council of California, a state inter-agency council involved with invasive species in the United States

== See also ==
- ISC (disambiguation)
- ISSC (disambiguation)
- International Solid-State Circuits Conference (ISSCC)
