= Campaign for Creativity =

The Campaign for Creativity (C4C) was an organisation that lobbied in favour of software patents. It was operated by Campbell Gentry, a London-based public relations firm, which had previously lobbied in favour of biological patents in the EU.

C4C described itself as being "supported by individuals across Europe". However, its finances were not transparent, and its website acknowledged the backing of software multinationals such as Microsoft and SAP. Critics, such as the FFII, suggested that C4C was merely a mouthpiece for the views of those multinationals, masquerading as a grass-roots organisation, without popular support.

The Campaign has consistently denied this and points to the six hundred small and medium-sized companies that participated in its work around the Directive.
