= Petridis =

Petridis or Petrides (Greek: Πετρίδης) is a Greek surname. It is a patronymic surname which literally means "the son of Petros", equivalent to English Peterson. Notable people with the surname include:

- Alexis Petridis (born 1971), English music journalist
- Elia Petridis, American filmmaker
- Ioannis Petridis (1931–2016), Greek economist and politician
- Konstantinos Petridis (born 1906), Greek sprinter
- Linos Petridis (born 1961), Cypriot swimmer
- Loukas Petridis (1850–1912), Ottoman Greek priest
- Tosca Petridis (born 1966), Australian boxer

== Fictional characters ==
- Nick Petrides, from the Australian soap opera Neighbours
