= Vliegen =

Vliegen is a surname. Notable people with the surname include:

- Joran Vliegen (born 1993), Belgian tennis player
- Kristof Vliegen (born 1982), Belgian tennis player
- Loïc Vliegen (born 1993), Belgian cyclist
- Olivier Vliegen (born 1999), Belgian footballer
