= Third Zimmerwald Conference =

Anti-war socialist conference

Stockholm Conference
- Begins: September 5, 1917
- Ends: September 12, 1917
- Location: Stockholm
- Country: Sweden
- Previous event: Kienthal Conference
- Next event: 1st Congress of the Comintern

The Third Zimmerwald Conference or the Stockholm Conference of 1917 was the third and final of the anti-war socialist conferences that had included Zimmerwald (1915) and Kienthal (1916). It was held in Stockholm on September 5–12, 1917.

== Background ==
The Third Zimmerwald Conference was originally called so that the Zimmerwald parties could discuss their attitude toward a proposed general conference of socialist parties in Stockholm that had been called by Petrograd Soviet and Dutch-Scandinavian Committee that had included the members of the old International Socialist Bureau. As this conference kept being postponed, so was the Zimmerwald meeting that was supposed to assemble before it, until late July 1917 when the International Socialist Commission decided to hold its own meeting regardless of what happened to the plans for the proposed general conference for September 5–12, 1917.

== Delegates ==
The following delegates attended the conference.

=== Neutral countries ===
- Social Democratic Left Party of Sweden and the Social Democratic Youth League - Oskar Samuelson, Fredrik Ström, Carl Lindhagen, Georg Lindström
- Socialist Youth League of Norway - Adam Egede-Nissen, Ernst Christian and Johannes Erwig
- Swiss Social Democratic Party - Ernst Nobs and Rosa Bloch
- Danish Socialist Youth League

==== Russian Republic ====
- Central Committee of the Russian Social Democratic Party (Bolshevik Party) - Vatslav Vatslavovich Vorovsky and Nikolai Semashko
- Organization Committee of the Russian Social Democratic Party (Mensheviks) - Pavel Axelrod and Mark Makadziub
- Menshevik Internationalists - Osip Ermansky
- Social Democratic Party of Finland - Yrjö Sirola
- Social Democracy of the Kingdom of Poland and Lithuania - Karl Radek and Jacob Hanecki

=== Entente countries ===
- Social Democratic Party of Romania - Alecu (Alexander) Constantinescu and Ion Costache Frimu
- Socialist Propaganda League of America - Fritz Rosen
- International Brotherhood Welfare Association - J. Eads How

=== Central powers ===
- Independent Social Democratic Party of Germany - Hugo Haase, Georg Ledebour, Arthur Stadthagen, Käte Duncker, Adolf Hofer and Robert Wengels
- Opposition elements within the Social Democratic Labor Party of German Austria - Therese Schlesinger and Elisabeth Luzzatto
- Opposition within the Bulgarian Social Democratic Workers' Party (Broad Socialists) - Nikola Kharlakov
- General Trade Union Federation - Katerina Tinev
- Bulgarian Social Democratic Workers' Party (Narrow Socialists) - Vasil Kolarov and Georgi Kirkov

The International Socialist Commission was represented by Angelica Balabanoff, Ture Nerman, Carl Hoglund and Carl Carlson. Lindhagen was appointed chairman of the presidium of the Conference and Balabanoff its secretary.

== Proceedings ==
The conference first heard reports from the ISC on its general operations and on the Grimm Affair. The conference approved of both reports. Next reports were heard on the progress of the Zimmerwald movement in various countries. Schlesinger spoke for Austria, Nissen for Norway, Sirola for Finland, Constantinescu for Romania and Rozin for the United States. Written reports were received from countries whose delegates had been unable to attend the conference because their passports had been denied, particularly Entente countries. Messages or greetings from Klara Zetkin, the Netherlands and the French Zimmerwaldists had already been received at the opening of the conference. On September 10, additional reports were made on the situation in Great Britain, France and Italy by members of the Petrograd Soviet who had just visited those countries. The Soviet representatives who made this report were Nikolai Rusanov, Hendrik Ehrlich and Yosef Goldberg.

There was broad agreement on some political questions, namely, that any peace achieved by the bourgeois governments or by the Pope would be reactionary - such a peace would contain the seeds of a new war, burden the workers with war debts, dampen class consciousness, stabilize class power and only prolong the struggle for socialism. There was some debate on the proposed Stockholm conference, even though it was felt that its prospects of meeting were "shattered". Radek, Dunker, Balabanoff, Hoglund and Sirola were against participation; Ledebour was personally against going to the conference, but that was not necessarily the official view of his party; Haase and Stadthagen favor participation, but only as a tactical move in order to settle accounts with the social patriots and majorities in an international setting; Axelrod stated that he would leave if the conference did not endorse the proposed conference and he did after the first meeting; Ermansky was for the conference "heart and soul.

On September 10, after hearing the reports of the Petrograd Soviet delegation on the situation in Western Europe, Nobs suggested a commission be elected to draw up a manifesto. The commission consisted of Balabanoff, Haase, Ledebour, Radek, Ermansky, Höglund, Dunker and Schlesinger. The text of the manifesto was hammered out in five meetings until it was unanimously adopted on September 12.

There was also some controversy with regard to the situation in Russia. After the representatives of the Organization Committee made their report, Orlovsky introduced a declaration on behalf of the Bolsheviks and the Polish and Lithuanian Social Democracy condemning the Mensheviks for keeping ministers in the Kerensky government even though it had initiated the Kerensky Offensive, reintroduced capital punishment in Russian military, suppressed socialist newspapers and imprisoned socialist leaders. Even though the declaration stated that the present conference did not have the power to expel the Mensheviks from the Zimmerwald movement, it stated that if a resolution was not adopted on the situation in Russia, that, implicitly, condemned the Mensheviks conduct, they would quit the conference. The issue was debated at length but, because some delegates did not feel they were sufficiently informed on events in Russia to commit themselves to such a resolution and because resolutions in the conference had to be unanimous, no action was taken and the Bolsheviks did not leave the conference.

At the last two conferences resolutions of sympathy for the victims of the war were drawn up at the end of the conference. This time a "fraternal greeting" was sent to those social democrats who had been persecuted for their opposition to the war - Friedrich Adler, Karl Liebknecht and Rosa Luxemburg were specifically mentioned. Also a telegram of solidarity was sent to Vladimir Lenin, Leon Trotsky, Grigory Zinoviev, Alexandra Kollontai and Christian Rakovsky rejecting the "libels" against them. The new ISC membership that had provisionally been agreed to that summer was ratified, with Höglund, Carlson and Nerman as bureau members and Balabanoff as secretary.

After the conference, an informal women's socialist conference was held by the female delegates

== Manifesto ==
The manifesto of the conference condemned the peace moves being made by the bourgeois governments. These manoeuverings, made under the pressure of the war weary masses, were only designed to mask the ruling classes' attempts to increase their sphere of exploitation, smash their adversaries and make conquests. A "capitalist peace" would only mean heavy war debts on the working masses, limitation of their rights and a strengthening of the capitalist state. The proposed Stockholm conference was also categorically condemned. The government socialists of either bloc had lost credibility because of their "hodman services" for the capitalist governments.

The only "true peace" would be one through the struggle of the proletarian masses to create socialist republics. This at the same time meant support of the Russian revolution, though even there "reaction" was raising its ugly head. The only way to a "socialist peace" was in a great international "mass action" on the part of the socialist proletariat of all countries. This was a most difficult duty, but it would lead to "the final liberation of mankind".

Because of the manifesto's content, it was agreed to keep it a secret until all the parties that were supposedly going to participate in the mass action could be informed. It was further delayed in Germany for political reasons. It was finally published a few days after the October Revolution.
