= Vienna Socialist Conference of 1915 =

The Vienna Socialist Conference of 1915 gathered representatives from the Socialist parties of Germany, Austria and Hungary to the only meeting of the pro-war socialist parties of the Central Powers during World War I.

Seen by some as a response of answer to the first conference of pro-Entente socialists that had gathered in London that February, the Vienna Conference met on April 12–13, 1915. It was attended by Friedrich Ebert, Hugo Haase, Luise Zietz, Hermann Molkenbuhr and Hermann Müller representing the Social Democratic Party of Germany; Ernő Garami and Zsigmond Kunfi for the Hungarian Social Democratic Party and an unknown number of representatives of the Social Democratic Workers Party of German Austria.

The conference passed a resolution declaring that the predictions of the socialist movement made at its international congresses had come true—that the armaments race would lead to a world-wide catastrophe. They proclaimed that the proletariat suffers most from the war, and it was only natural that people in the belligerent as well as the neutral countries would be longing for peace and that the Social Democratic parties have always, and still do, strive for world peace and the brotherhood of peoples. However, the resolution also states that peoples were fighting to defend their independence and "that only such a peace as would not humiliate any of the peoples is possible, for only such a peace could establish a lasting co-operation among all civilized peoples.

The resolution stated four specific conditions that would be necessary for peace:

- the establishment of international courts with compulsory arbitration in international conflicts
- subjection of all international treaties to parliamentary, democratic control
- limitation of armaments with disarmament as the final aim
- national self-determination

The resolution concluded by noting that the fact that Social Democratic parties defended their countries should not be an obstacle to maintaining international contact with other parties, or result in the suspension of activities of their international institutions.

== See also ==
- Inter-Allied Socialist Conferences of World War I
- Neutral Socialist Conferences during the First World War
