= Robert Grimm =

Swiss politician

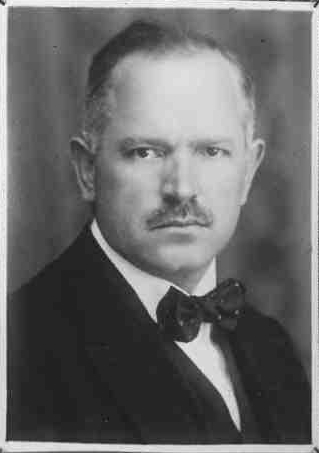
Robert Grimm (1930)

Robert Grimm (16 April 1881, in Wald – 8 March 1958) was the leading Swiss Socialist politician during the first half of the 20th century.

As a leading member of the Social Democratic Party of Switzerland he opposed the First World War. Grimm was the main organiser of the Zimmerwald Movement and the chairman of the International Socialist Commission in Bern 1915–1917. After the Grimm–Hoffmann Affair he had to resign from this function.

Grimm was the leader of the Swiss general strike in November 1918. The demands of the strike included the 48-hour working week, old-age pensions and women suffrage. In April 1919, a military tribunal sentenced Grimm to six months in prison for calling on soldiers to refuse orders to open fire on the strikers.

Grimm was among the founders of the International Working Union of Socialist Parties. He held various parliamentary seats and executive functions from communal to federal level between 1909 and 1955. In 1946 he became President of the Swiss National Council.

Preceded by Pierre Aeby	President of the National Council; 1945/1946	Succeeded by Max Wey
