= Initiative for Software Choice =

The Initiative for Software Choice (ISC) is a lobby group founded in May 2002 in response to widespread international government interest in open source software. The ISC website characterizes its membership as "committed to advancing the concept that multiple competing software markets should be allowed to develop and flourish unimpeded by government preference or mandate".

According to many Free Software advocates such as Bruce Perens, Microsoft founded ISC in reaction to the call for the adoption of Free Software by politicians in many countries.

The Computing Technology Industry Association (CompTIA) chairs the Initiative.
