= Luise Zietz =

German socialist and feminist (1865–1922)

Luise Catharina Amalie Zietz
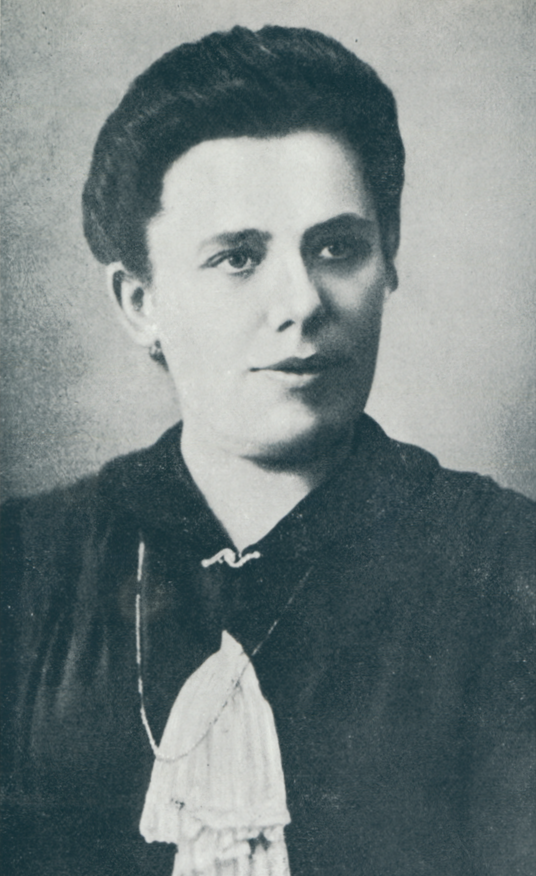
- Luise Zietz (around 1908)
- Born: 25 March 1865; Bargteheide, Holstein, Prussia
- Died: 27 January 1922 (aged 56); Berlin, Free State of Prussia, Weimar Republic
- Occupations: feminist, politician, member of the Weimar National Assembly, member of the Reichstag of the Weimar Republic
- Years active: 1896–1922
- Known for: one of the first female members of the Reichstag

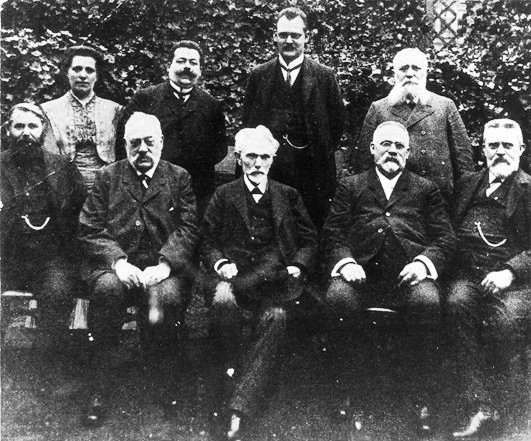
Picture with Luise Zietz at the top left.

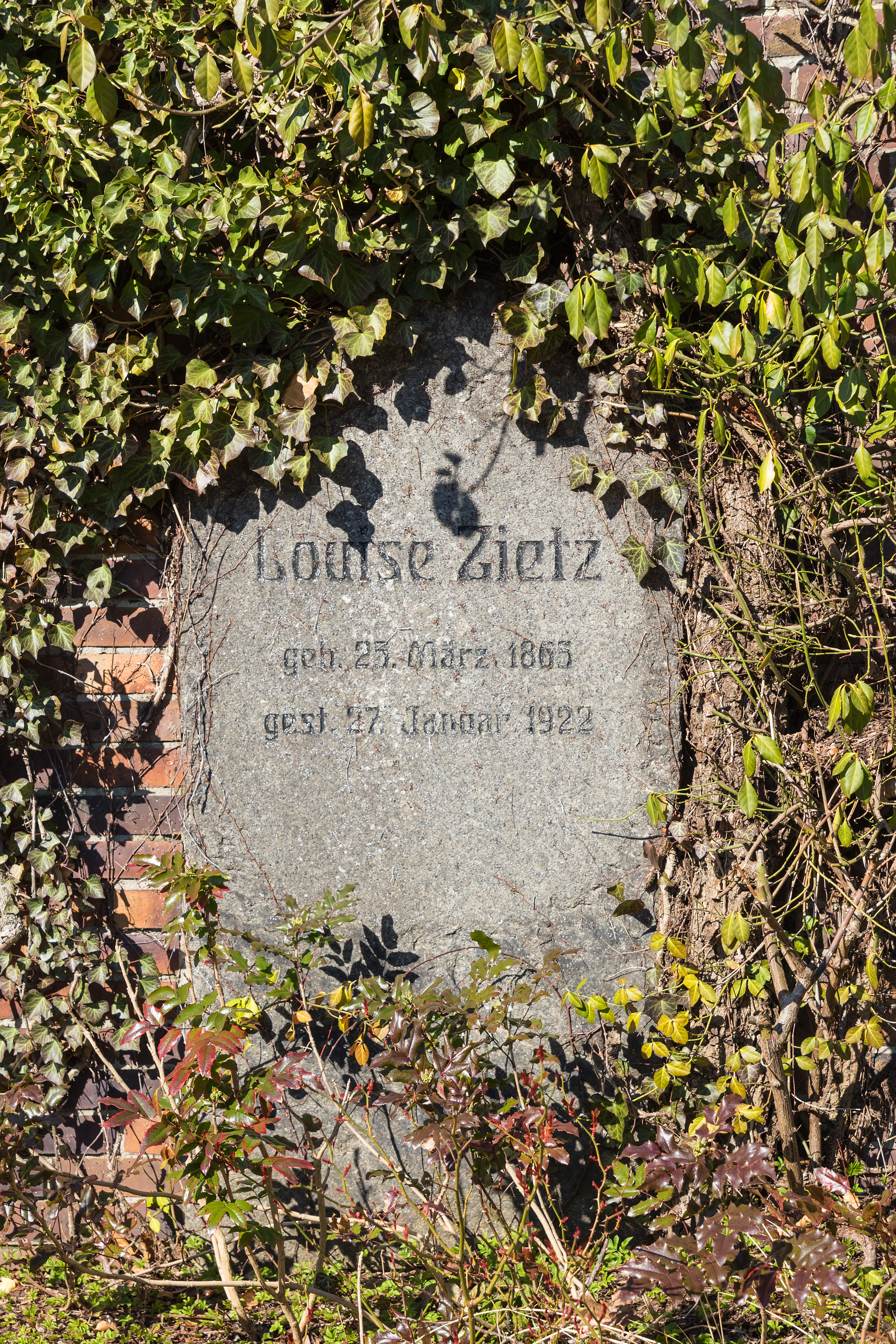
Grave of Luise Zietz.

Luise Catharina Amalie Zietz (née: Körner) (1865–1922) was a German socialist and feminist. She was the first woman to occupy a leading party post in Germany. She also helped bring the socialist women's movement into the Social Democratic Party of Germany.

In 1908, the same year the government legalized women's participation in politics, she became the first woman appointed to the executive committee of the Social Democratic Party of Germany. She later nominated Marie Juchacz for a paid position by the party as the Cologne women's secretary in what was then the Upper Rhine province.

Zietz and Friedrich Ebert, Hugo Haase, Hermann Molkenbuhr and Hermann Müller attended the Vienna Socialist Conference of 1915 representing the Social Democratic Party of Germany.

In 1917 she was one of the main agitators in favor of a split in the party, which led to the formation of the Independent Social Democratic Party of Germany. She then became a leader in the creation of that party's women's movement.

She was one of the first female members of the new Reichstag in 1919.
