= Bertha Thalheimer =

German left-wing peace activist and politician

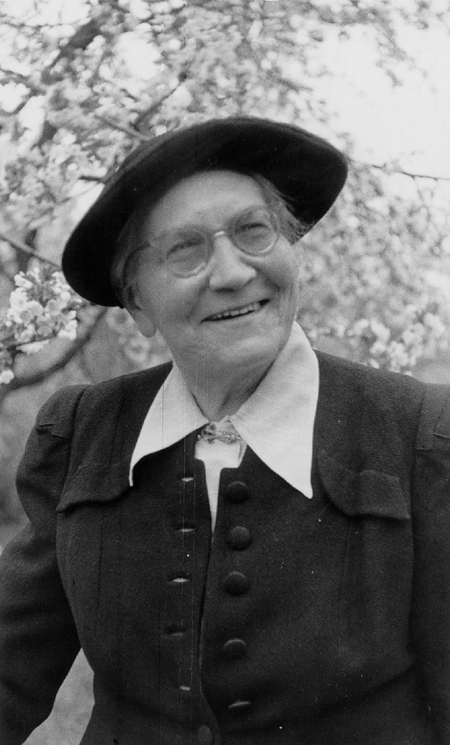
Bertha Thalheimer

Bertha Thalheimer (17 March 1883 – 23 April 1959) was a German left-wing peace activist who became a politician (KPD).

== Life ==
=== Provenance and early years ===
Bertha Thalheimer was born in Affaltrach in southern Germany, a short distance to the east of Heilbronn. Moritz Thalheimer, her father, was a prosperous businessman and real estate agent with an active interest in politics. He was close to some of the leading Social Democrat left-wingers of his generation, including Clara Zetkin and the Mehrings. Thanks to her father's political connections she also met the pioneering thinker Rosa Luxemburg fairly early on.

Bertha was almost precisely one year older than her brother August who grew up to become a Marxist philosopher and, like her, a political activist. As long as they both lived, Bertha and her brother would be closely aligned politically.

The family relocated to Winnenden in 1892 and then, to Cannstatt in 1899. Here she completed her schooling at the Boys' Gymnasium (secondary school), for which special permission was obtained, presumably because there was no place available at an appropriately academic girls' school. Her brother, meanwhile, concluded his schooling at an elite Jesuit school, although the Thalheimers were a Jewish family. On leaving school she moved to Berlin to study Applied Economics ("Nationalökonomie").

=== Politics ===
In 1910, the Thalheimer siblings joined the Social Democratic Party. They gravitated easily to the left of the party working on political matters with friends such as Rosa Luxemburg, Clara Zetkin, Fritz Westmeyer and the Mehrings. Bertha saw her most important task as the political education of young people. August and Bertha Thalheimer both wrote for "Gleichheit" ("Equality"), the feminist magazine edited by Clara Zetkin, and for the regional socialist newspaper "Göppinger Freie Volkszeitung" for which August Thalheimer became the editor. By 1914, Bertha Thalheimer had become a member of the regional SPD party executive.

=== War: peace activism ===
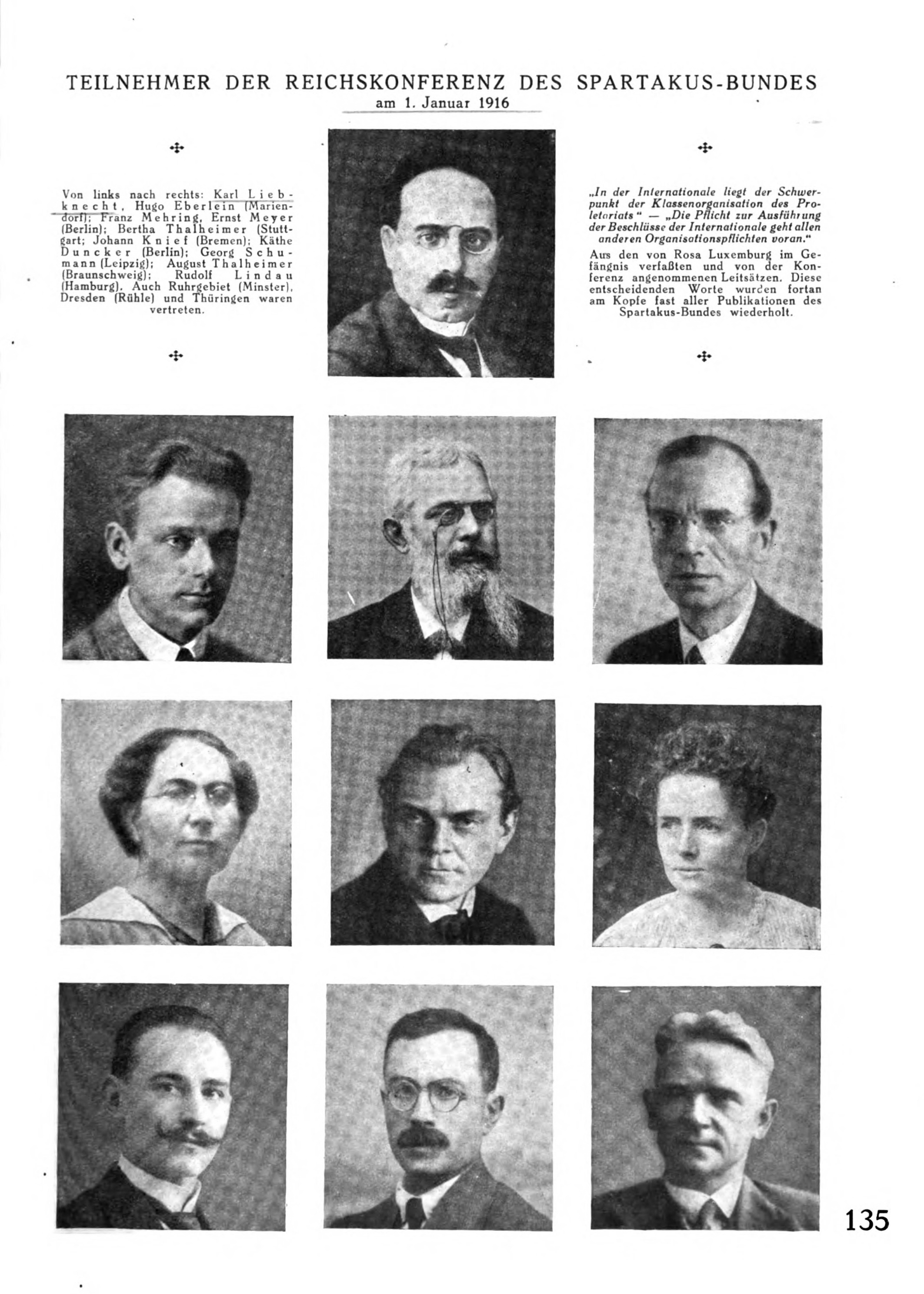
Thalheimer (third row, left) among participants of the Reich Conference of the Spartacus League, 1 January 1916

War broke out in July 1914. The decision by the party leadership, citing "defense of the fatherland", to implement what amounted to a parliamentary truce ("Burgfriedenspolitik") on votes involving funding for the war was contentious within the party from the outset. An antiwar group quickly emerged in the Württemberg SPD with Clara Zetkin, Fritz Westmeyer and the Thalheimer siblings at its heart. They quickly linked up with the party's pacifist group at a national level, becoming known as the International Group, and headed up by Karl Liebknecht and their friend Rosa Luxemburg. In 1915 Bertha Thalheimer was a co-founder of the anti-war Spartacus League, and was one of the organisers of its launch conference held in Berlin in January 1916. In September 1915, together with Ernst Meyer, she represented the league at the Zimmerwald Conference, an international conference of socialist pacifists held near Bern in Switzerland. She also represented the Spartacus League six months later at the follow-up Kienthal Conference. The conferences demanded an immediate peace, without territorial annexations. They called on the German SPD to reject further war funding. During these years Bertha Thalheimer and her sister-in-law Cläre Thalheimer were also working closely with Leo Jogiches. Although the anti-war message gained popular traction, the political authorities in the leading belligerent powers - except in the Russian Empire - were untouched by it: in March 1917 Thalheimer, who had been participating in anti-war street protests in defiance of court orders, was arrested for "anti-military activities" (wegen "antimilitaristischer Tätigkeit"): in October 1917 she was convicted on charges of high treason by a Stuttgart court, which sentenced her to two years in prison. Her co-accused, Cläre (or Klara) Thalheimer, was acquitted. Bertha served more than a year of the sentence in Castle Delitsch near Halle which had been adapted for use as a jail.

=== Communist party ===
War ended in military defeat for Germany in November 1918. A wave of revolutions broke out across the country. Revolutionaries broke into prisons, releasing the inmates. Elsewhere the panicking authorities released prisoners in order to averts such attacks. Bertha Thalheimer was one of thousands of prisoners who found themselves abruptly released. By the end of 1918 she was participating in what became the founding conference of the Communist Party which took place in Berlin between 30 December 1918 and 1 January 1919. The party leaders were the former leaders of the Spartacus League of which in many ways the Communist Party was a continuation, although by the end of January 1919 the two most prominent of these had been killed by "Freikorps" volunteers. Bertha Thalheimer took on responsibilities for guiding the women's activities in the party.

Thalheimer married the mechanic Karl Wilhelm Schöttle in 1920: the marriage ended in divorce in 1933. While her brother, for a couple of years during the early 1920s, took a leading position in the party, Bertha Thalheimer was a co-founder in 1925, of the Red Women's and Girls' League ("Der „Rote Frauen und Mädchenbund“" / RFMB). However, as the decade progressed the party leadership was taken over by hardline Stalinists. The increasingly bitter rivalry in the Moscow party between Stalin and those, notably Leon Trotsky, who doubted the direction in which he was taking the Soviet Union, found strong echoes in the German party under the leadership of Ernst Thälmann. August Thalheimer was increasingly critical and spent much of the 1920s being kept out of the way in Moscow. He became ill and returned to Germany late in 1927, however. As an intellectually formidable representative of the party's "anti-Stalin" right wing he was distrusted by the party leadership and, early in 1929, expelled from the German party. Bertha Thalheimer, who shared her brother's rejection of domination of the party from Moscow, was expelled from the German party at about the same time.

=== Communist Party (Opposition) ===
A large number of people were expelled from the Communist Party in 1929 and many of them joined a newly formed alternative communist party known as the Communist Party (Opposition) ("Kommunistische Partei Deutschlands (Opposition)" / KPDO / KPO) of which her brother had been a co-founder. Bertha Thalheimer worked for the KPO as a speaker and as a journalist, writing contributions for the party's bimonthly newspaper "Arbeiterpolitik" and for the Stuttgart-based "Arbeiter-Tribüne".

=== Nazi years ===
The political backdrop changed, as it seemed, permanently in January 1933 when the Nazi Party took power in Germany and lost little time in transforming the country into a one-party dictatorship. The Nazis had built their support base on the traditional populist twin pillars of hope and hate. The principal targets of their hate were Communists and Jews. From a Nazi perspective Bertha Thalheimer qualified as both Communist and Jewish. This was the context in which Karl Wilhelm Schöttle, who was categorised as an Aryan, and Bertha Thalheimer were now divorced, although she continued to receive material support from her former husband. Meanwhile her brother emigrated, initially to France and ultimately to Cuba.

Bertha remained in Germany, under constant threat of persecution but nevertheless well supported by friends. At one stage she was earning a living by selling coffee from door to door. In 1941 she was forcibly transferred into a so-called "Jews House" (ein "Judenhaus") in Stuttgart. In 1943 she was deported to the Theresienstadt concentration camp. She survived.

=== After the war ===
After she was liberated by the Soviet army in May 1945, Bertha Thalheimer immediately returned to Stuttgart and rejoined the no-longer outlawed Communist Party. What remained of Germany was now divided into four military occupation zones. Stuttgart was administered as part of the American zone. Bertha tried to arrange a job and a return from exile for her brother. However, with Cold War tensions rising rapidly as the Soviet Union consolidated its hold on central Europe, the military authorities were not willing to import a high-profile communist intellectual into Germany's US occupation zone, and when August Thalheimer died in September 1948 it was still as a German exile, still in Cuba. His widow, Bertha's sister in law Cläre, now left Cuba with her son: her destination was not Germany, however, but Australia, where she settled in Wandiligong and made a new life for herself as a teacher.

A series of troubling events in the Soviet occupation zone between 1945 and 1948 gave rise to suspicions that the Communist Party of Germany was in danger of becoming a tool of Soviet foreign policy, and while levels of support for its successor in the Soviet zone are hard to determine objectively, in the American, British and French occupation zones, declining levels of support suggest widespread disenchantment with it. Disappointed, Bertha Thalheimer left the Communist Party (again) in 1948. She joined the new Gruppe Arbeiterpolitik organisation which was in many respects a survivors' revived version of the old KPO. The group took its world political outlook largely from the writings of the format KPO policy man, Bertha's brother, August Thalheimer who was dying in Cuba during this time. Within the trades union movement of the zones which became, after May 1949, the German Federal Republic (West Germany), the group promoted a robustly anti-Stalinist version of socialism. From 1952 Bertha Thalheimer took responsibility for Arbeiterpolitik's newspaper.

However, Thalheimer's health had been permanently damaged by the rigours of life at the Theresienstadt concentration camp. On 23 April 1959 Bertha Schöttle-Thalheimer died in Stuttgart. The street Bertha-Thalheimer-Weg in Stuttgart is named after her.
