= Arnold Pomerans =

German-born British translator (1920–2005)

Arnold Julius Pomerans
- Born: 27 April 1920; Königsberg, Germany
- Died: 30 May 2005 (aged 85); Polstead, Suffolk, England
- Occupation: Translator
- Awards: Schlegel-Tieck Prize

Arnold Julius Pomerans (27 April 1920 – 30 May 2005) was a German-born British translator.

Arnold Pomerans was born in Königsberg, Germany, on 27 April 1920 to a Jewish family. Because of growing antisemitism in Germany the family left for Yugoslavia and later South Africa. In 1948 Arnold Pomerans emigrated to England, where he became a full-time translator in the 1950s, after first working as a teacher.

He translated about two hundred works of fiction and non-fiction, selected from most European languages. Among the authors he translated are Louis de Broglie, Werner Heisenberg, Anne Frank, Sigmund Freud, Johan Huizinga, Jean Piaget, Jacques Presser and Jan Romein. His translation of George Grosz's autobiography A Little Yes and a Big No earned him the 1983 Schlegel-Tieck Prize and in 1997 Pomerans was awarded the PEN Translation Prize for The Selected Letters of Vincent Van Gogh. In his obituary, he was called "one of Britain's finest translators" by The Independent.

In 1956, Pomerans married Erica White and they moved to Polstead in Suffolk the following year. They carried out much of the translation work together. He died in Polstead of cancer on 30 May 2005, aged 85.
