= Spartacus League =

World War I German Marxist revolutionary movement

- Spartakusbund
- Founders: Karl Liebknecht; Rosa Luxemburg; Clara Zetkin
- Founded: 4 August 1914
- Dissolved: 30 December 1918
- Split from: Social Democratic Party
- Country: German Empire; Weimar Republic
- Ideology: Marxism; Luxemburgism; Revolutionary socialism Council communism Left communism
- Political position: Far-left
- Status: Defunct

The Spartacus League (German: Spartakusbund) was a left revolutionary movement organized in Germany during World War I and immediately thereafter. It was founded in August 1914 as the International Group by Rosa Luxemburg, Karl Liebknecht, Clara Zetkin, and other members of the Social Democratic Party of Germany (SPD) who were dissatisfied with the party's official policies in support of the war. In 1916 it renamed itself the Spartacus Group and in 1917 joined the Independent Social Democratic Party of Germany (USPD), which had split off from the SPD as its left wing faction.

During the November Revolution of 1918 that broke out across Germany at the end of the war, the Spartacus Group re-established itself as a nationwide, non-party organization called the "Spartacus League" with the goal of instituting a council republic that would include all of Germany. It became part of the Communist Party of Germany (KPD) when it was formed on 30 December 1918 and at that point ceased to exist as a separate entity.

The League's name referred to Spartacus, the leader of a major slave uprising against the Roman Republic (73–71 BCE). For the Spartacists, his name symbolized the ongoing resistance of the oppressed against their exploiters and thus expressed the Marxist view of historical materialism, according to which history is driven by class struggles.

== History ==
=== Background ===
At the 1907 congresses of the Second International in London and Stuttgart, it was decided that the European social democratic and socialist parties would oppose the threat of war between the major European powers. At the 1912 Basel conference, additional antiwar measures were decided on, including that the working classes should "exert every effort to prevent the outbreak of war by the means they considered most effective". The SPD had explicitly and repeatedly opposed an imperialist war in Europe, approved measures against it and announced them publicly. During the July crisis of 1914 that followed the assassination of Archduke Franz Ferdinand of Austria-Hungary, it reaffirmed its rejection of war in nationwide large-scale demonstrations by its supporters.

On 4 August 1914, just days after the start of World War I, the Reichstag voted on loans to fund the war. The SPD's Reichstag membership voted unanimously in favor of both the loans and Burgfriedenspolitik, a policy of political truce under which the parties would support war loans and not criticize the government or the war, and the trade unions would not strike. Even Karl Liebknecht, an outspoken anti-militarist, voted in favor because of the SPD's unwritten rule to maintain party solidarity and unity. With its approval of the imperial government's war policy, the SPD parliamentary group abandoned three program points that they had adhered to since the party's founding: proletarian internationalism, class struggle and opposition to militarism.

=== The International Group ===
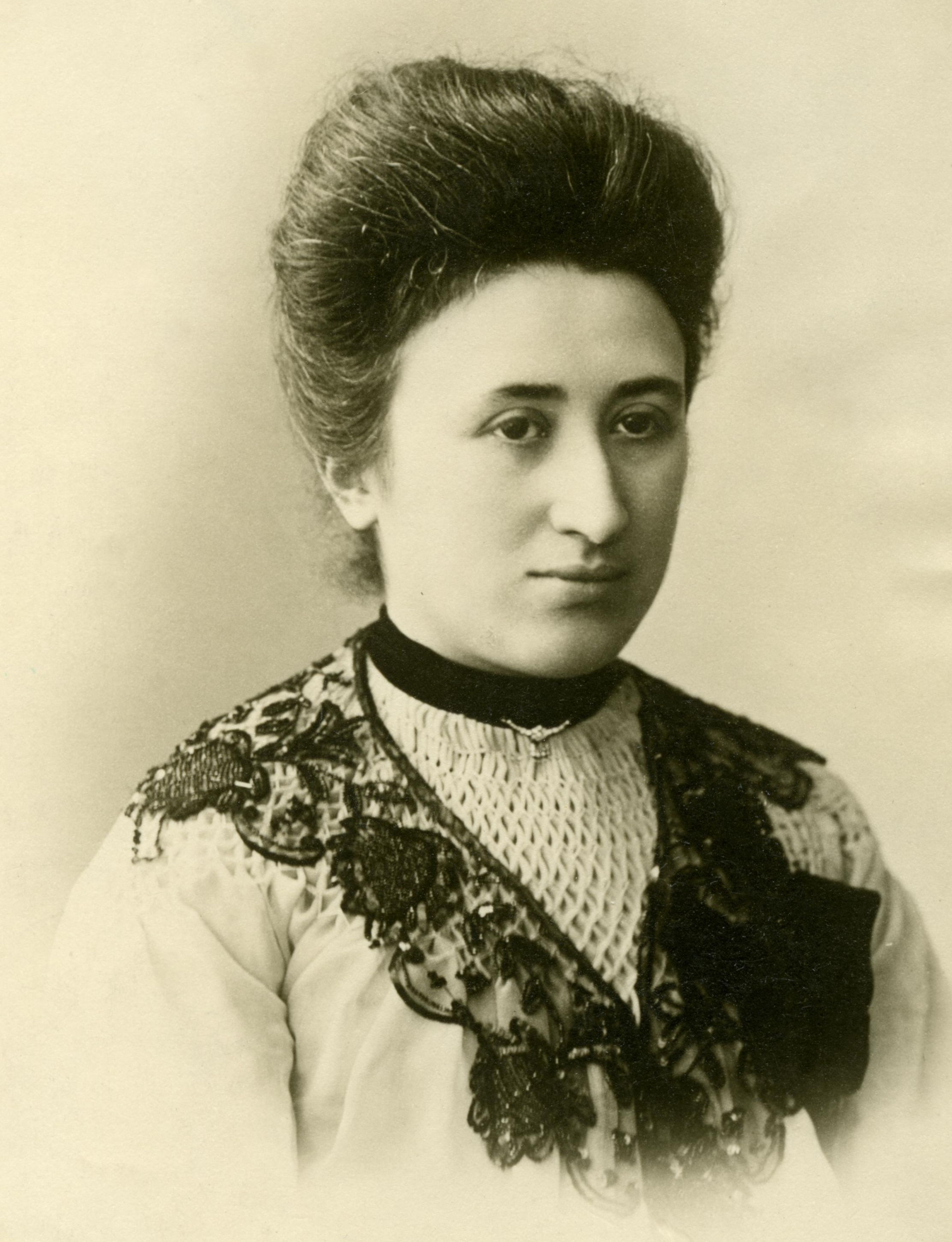
Rosa Luxemburg, c. 1900

The International Group (Gruppe Internationale) came about through Rosa Luxemburg's initiative. Immediately after the vote on war loans, she invited the SPD opponents of the war who were her friends to her Berlin apartment. The evening meeting on 4 August 1914 was attended by six guests who, together with Luxemburg, formed the nucleus of the later Spartacus League: Hermann Duncker, Hugo Eberlein, Julian Marchlewski, Franz Mehring, Ernst Meyer and Wilhelm Pieck. In the following week, a number of others joined the group: Martha Arendsee, Fritz Ausländer, Heinrich Brandler, Käte Duncker, Otto Gäbel, Otto Geithner, Leo Jogiches, Karl Liebknecht, August Thalheimer and Bertha Thalheimer.

The International Group saw the SPD's approval of the war loans as a betrayal of the goals of pan-European social democracy and especially of the international solidarity of the workers' movement against the war. It maintained its pre-war goals and rejected the war as an imperialist genocide by the ruling bourgeoisie directed against the interests of the peoples of Europe and the proletariat.

The idea of a withdrawal from the SPD that was contemplated by some International Group members was quickly discarded since it was expected that the government would soon ban the SPD's activities and that the SPD majority would then abandon the political truce. It was decided to organize the struggle against the war within the SPD, to persuade the SPD majority to reject further war loans, and to restore international solidarity with other European workers' parties.

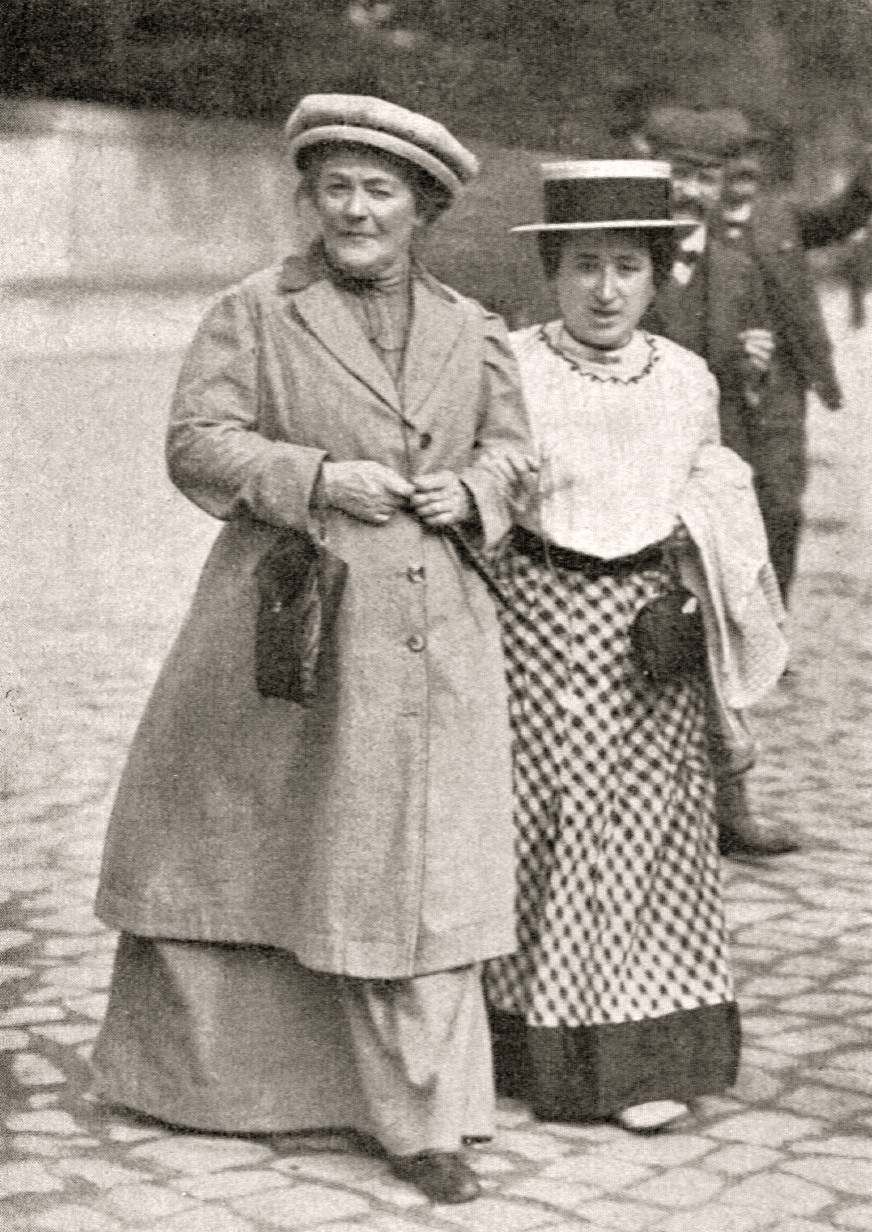
Clara Zetkin (left) with Rosa Luxemburg in 1910.

The group's first step was to send 300 telegrams to SPD members urging them to publicly reject the SPD Reichstag faction's 4 August resolution. Only Clara Zetkin responded immediately and unreservedly in favor. Among the SPD's local groups, those in Berlin-Charlottenburg and Berlin-Mariendorf were initially the only ones to declare their support for the appeal. On 30 October 1914, the International Group publicly distanced itself from the SPD leadership, which had previously criticized the Second International in the Swiss newspaper Berner Tagwacht. From that point on the group's members were under police surveillance, and soon after some were arrested and imprisoned.

On 2 December 1914 Karl Liebknecht was the first and initially the only SPD deputy in the Reichstag to vote against the extension of the war loans. In January 1915, Otto Rühle and a number of others spoke out against the war and the party majority's affirmation of the war within the SPD parliamentary group.

In March 1915 the group published a magazine under the name Internationale, which appeared only once and was immediately confiscated by the police.

=== Spartacus Group ===
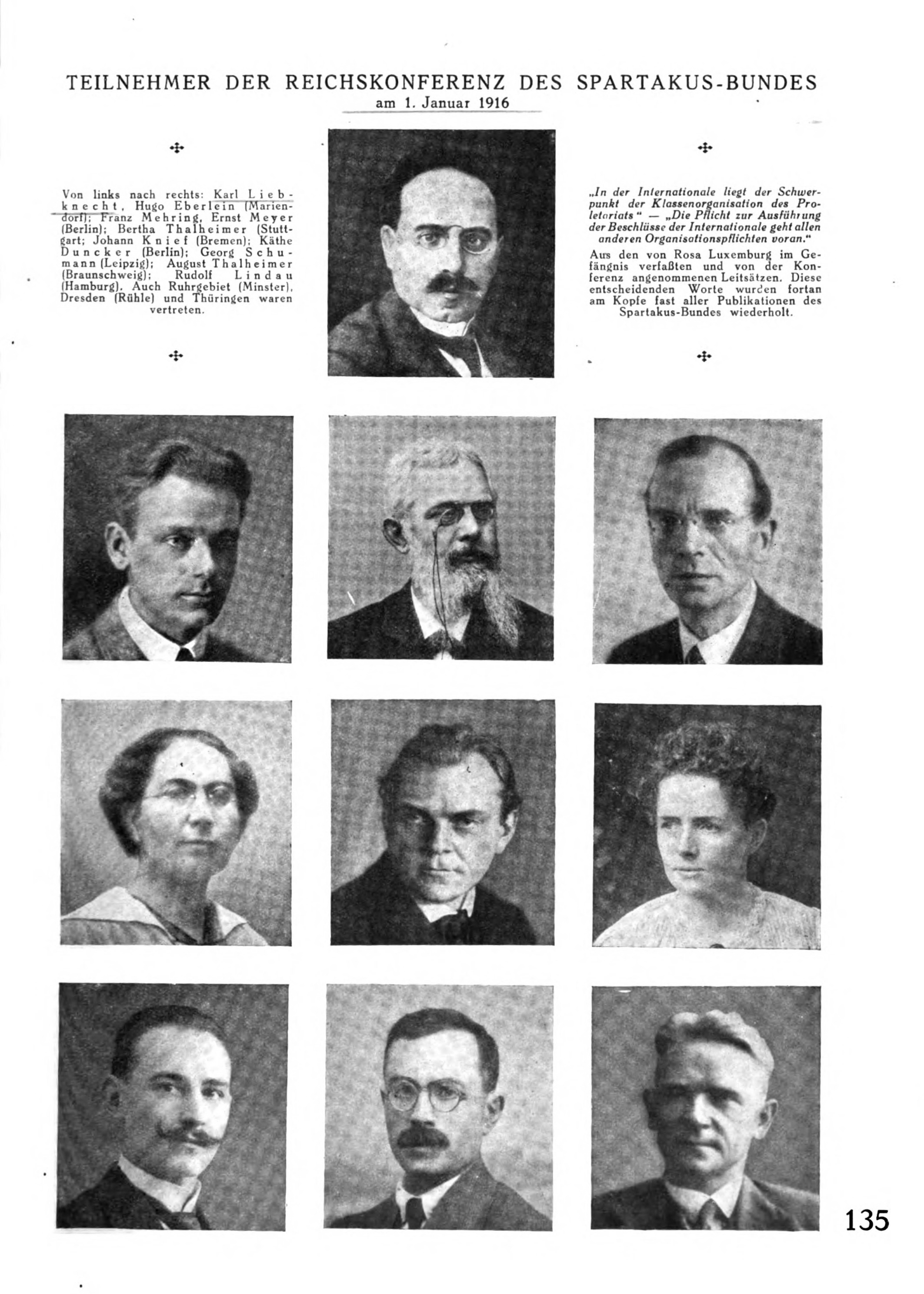
Participants of the Reich Conference of the Spartacus League, 1 January 1916

In 1916 the group expanded its organization throughout the Reich. On 1 January it adopted as its program the "Guiding Principles on the Tasks of International Social Democracy" (Leitsätze über die Aufgaben der internationalen Sozialdemokratie) that Rosa Luxemburg had written while in prison. On 27 January the first of the illegal "Spartacus Letters" appeared. They detailed the group's goals and gave it the popular name "Spartacus" that its members adopted, calling themselves the "Spartacus Group".

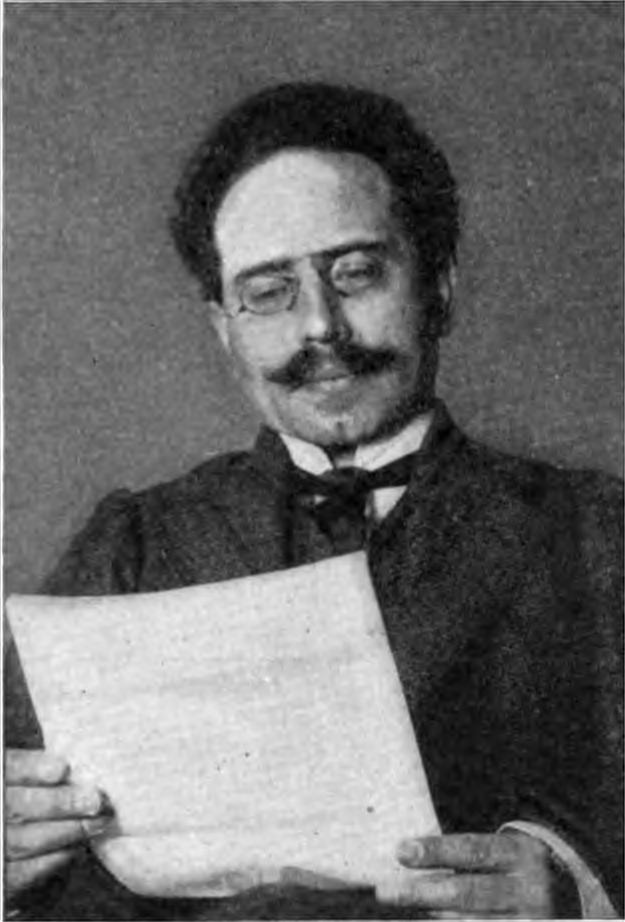
Karl Liebknecht, July 1915

The minority of declared opponents of the war within the SPD parliamentary group had grown to 20 by December 1915. Karl Liebknecht was expelled from the party in January 1916, Otto Rühle resigned in solidarity with Liebknecht, and the 18 other dissenters were expelled in March 1916. Meanwhile, the Spartacus Group gained new members. Among the better known were Willi Budich, Edwin Hoernle, Paul Lange, Jacob Walcher and Friedrich Westmeyer.

=== Affiliation with the USPD ===
In April 1917 the opponents of the war within the SPD founded their own party, the Independent Social Democratic Party (USPD); the rest of the SPD then took the name Majority Social Democratic Party (MSPD). The Spartacus Group joined the USPD even though it had previously opposed splitting the SPD. But it retained its group status as a "closed propaganda association" in order to influence the USPD. In the USPD, too, the internationalist Marxists were a minority. Revisionists like Eduard Bernstein and centrists like Hugo Haase and the SPD's former platform writer Karl Kautsky were in agreement with the Spartacists only when it came to rejecting war loans. At the Zimmerwald Conference, an international antiwar convention held in September 1915, they had refused to defend their rejection in the face of the party discipline of the SPD in the Reichstag. The Spartacus Group had severely criticized them at the time.

=== Relationship with the Bolsheviks ===
In 1917 the Spartacus Group hailed the first (February) revolution in Russia that year as a victory for its own cause that was important for Europe and the whole world. Rosa Luxemburg saw educating German workers about the revolution as the Spartacus Group's most important task at the time. From the summer of 1917 she and Leo Jogiches criticized the Bolsheviks' putschist policies against Alexander Kerensky's government in Petrograd. They also rejected Lenin's and Leon Trotsky's pursuit of a separate peace with the German Empire because they thought that such a peace would endanger both international proletarian opposition to war and the prospect for a successful German revolution. Luxemburg distanced herself from the Treaty of Brest-Litovsk (3 March 1918) that ended the war between Germany and Russia, as well as from the supplementary agreement to it of 27 August 1918. She found the terrorist measures of the Bolsheviks under Felix Dzerzhinsky repugnant. In September 1918 she called the threats made by Lenin's friend Karl Radek to "slaughter the bourgeoisie" after an attempted assassination of Lenin "an idiocy of the first order".

In her essay The Russian Revolution from the fall of 1918, Luxemburg welcomed in principle the October Revolution of 1917, in which the Bolsheviks under Lenin and Leon Trotsky dissolved the Duma and seized state power, but she criticized the Bolsheviks' party organization, Lenin's cadre concept, and the intra-party dictatorship for the way they impeded and stifled the democratic participation of workers in the revolution. The other Spartacists deferred public criticism of the Bolsheviks out of loyalty. Paul Levi did not publish Luxemburg's essay until 1922, three years after the author's death.

The Spartacus Group remained organizationally and politically independent of communists until it was absorbed into the KPD. It came closer to them politically only in the course of the November Revolution in Germany, when it decided in December 1918 to found a separate party with other left-wing radicals. This was in response to the USPD's rejection of a party congress proposed by Luxemburg.

=== Revolutionary program ===
In October 1918 the German government passed a series of constitutional and legislative reforms, in part in the hope of securing better peace conditions from the Allies of World War I. The reforms strengthened the Reichstag and the parliamentary form of government, but the emperor still appointed the chancellor and retained command authority. On 7 October 1918 the Spartacus Group reacted to the reforms and to the SPD's participation in them with an illegally held Reich conference in Berlin. There a revolutionary program against war and capitalism was adopted. Its demands were:

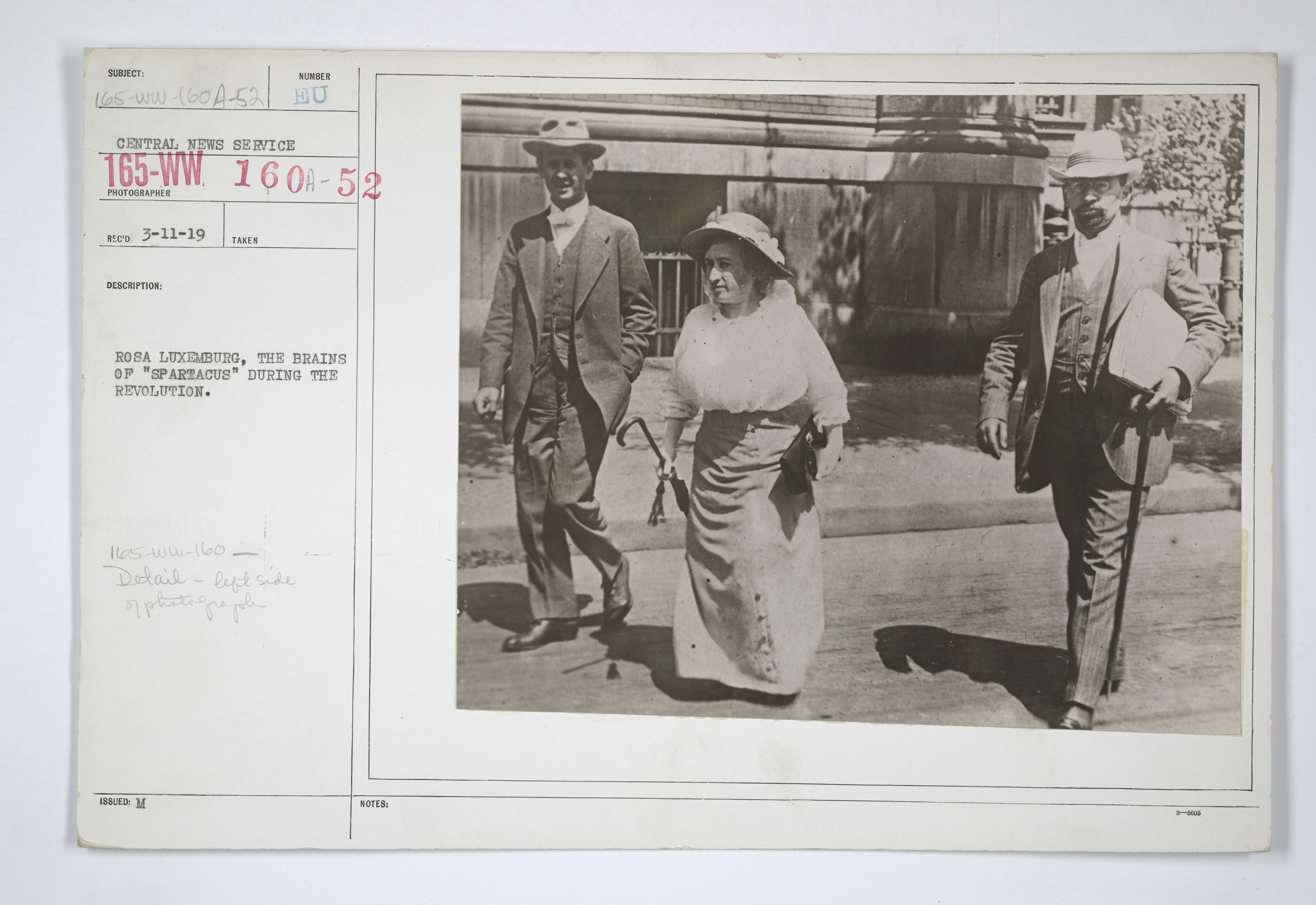
« Enemy Activities - German Revolution Continued - Rosa Luxemburg, the brains of "Spartacus" during the revolution », United States Department of War, 1917-1918.

- the immediate end of the war,
- cancellation of all war bonds without any compensation,
- the achievement of democratic rights and freedoms,
- comprehensive judicial reform to abolish class suffrage and class justice,
- the direct democratic disempowerment and disarmament of the imperial officer corps,
- the socialization of the means of production, the expropriation of all bank capital, mines and smelters – in other words, the heavy industry that was decisive for the war, above all the armaments industry,
- finally, the establishment of a socialist republic.

The demands for the democratization of the army were particularly detailed, as this was seen as the key to a successful revolution:

- granting soldiers the right of association and assembly in on-duty and off-duty matters,
- abolition of disciplinary punishment by superiors; discipline to be maintained by soldier delegates,
- abolition of courts-martial,
- removal of superiors by majority vote of those subordinate to them,
- abolition of the death penalty and penal sentences for political and military offenses.

The Spartacus Group issued a Reich-wide leaflet with these demands. It stressed that they were a touchstone for the democratic intentions of the MSPD, whose entry into the wartime government it regarded as a betrayal of the workers' interests.

The Spartacus Group made reference to the 1848 Communist Manifesto of Karl Marx and Friedrich Engels and pledged itself to the dictatorship of the proletariat, i.e. workers' control of the means of production and operation. Unlike the Bolsheviks, however, the Spartacus Group was not constituted as an elite cadre party.

=== Beginning of the November Revolution ===
The November Revolution started as a result the Kiel mutiny, when ships' crews resisted an order to prepare for a decisive battle with the British fleet. They appointed or elected workers' and soldiers' councils without the initiative or leadership of any of the left-wing parties. An essential prerequisite for this revolutionary coming together of workers and soldiers was the January 1918 strike in the German armaments industry. Revolutionary stewards who were independent of parties but often close to the USPD had emerged and now carried the revolution into big cities throughout the Reich. The newly formed workers' councils took up some of the demands of the Spartacus Group without it having called on them to do so or being able to exert any organizational influence on them, since until then such activity had been banned. The German workers' and soldiers' councils arose spontaneously in sections of the imperial military, local governments, and large industrial enterprises. They were not subordinate to a party and, unlike the Russian soviets, did not serve to pave the way for the exclusive control of any one party.

In anticipation of the end of the war, Karl Liebknecht was released from prison under an amnesty on 23 October 1918. He joined the executive council of the Berlin Revolutionary Stewards on 26 October and planned mass demonstrations with them to launch a national revolution. Because the Stewards wanted to postpone such actions until 11 November, their schedule was overtaken by the Kiel sailors' uprising and the November Revolution it triggered.

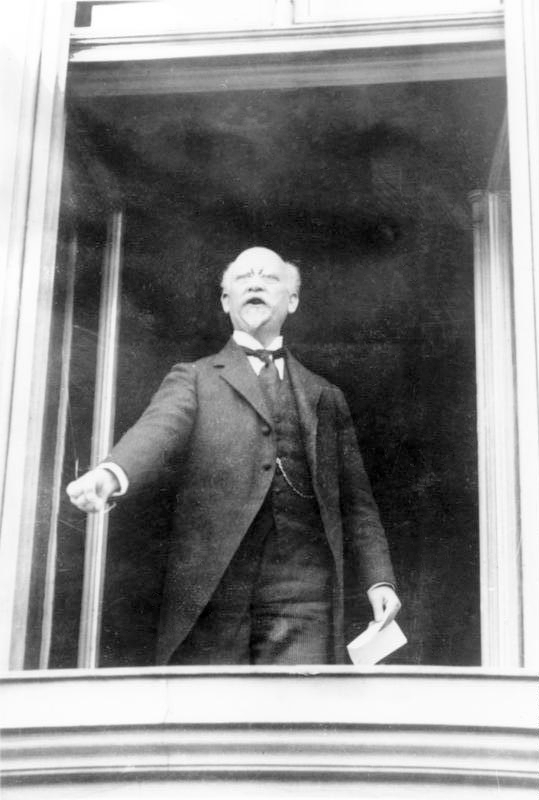
Philipp Scheidemann proclaiming the German Republic from a window of the Reichstag building.

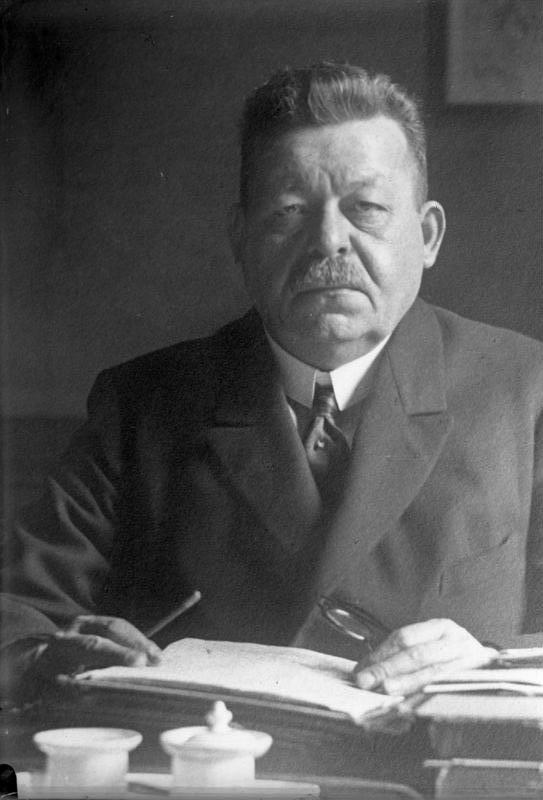
Friedrich Ebert

On 9 November 1918, a republic was proclaimed twice: Philipp Scheidemann (MSPD) proclaimed "the German Republic" from the balcony of the Reichstag building in the morning. Liebknecht then proclaimed "the free socialist republic of Germany" about two hours later in the Lustgarten, then later from the Berlin Palace.

There was no joy over what had been achieved that day in the Spartacus Group. The following night the leaders agreed that only a "first, quick victory" had been won. The goals set were to completely eliminate feudalism and the aristocratic Prussian Junker class, to overcome national "fragmentation into fatherlands and little fatherlands", and to create a socialist republic. To this end, the workers' and soldiers' councils were to assume all power, the Reichstag and all state parliaments eliminated, along with the provisional Reich government under the majority Social Democrat Friedrich Ebert.

=== Re-founding as the Spartacus League ===
On 11 November 1918, on Liebknecht's initiative, the Spartacus Group was re-founded at the Excelsior Hotel in Berlin. It became an autonomous, party-independent, national organization. The new name Spartacus League (Spartakusbund) was intended to express a higher level of organization and at the same time to distinguish it from the USPD. In the November Revolution the Spartacus League fought for taking power from the military, the socialization of key industries and the creation of a soviet republic as a future German state. Rosa Luxemburg wrote its platform, which called for immediate measures to protect the revolution:

- disarming the police and all members of the ruling classes,
- arming the proletariat and forming a Red Guard,
- takeover of all municipal councils and state parliaments by freely elected workers' and soldiers' councils,
- socialization (transfer to the people's ownership) of all banks, mines, smelters and large enterprises,
- contacting all like-minded foreign parties in order to internationalize the revolution.

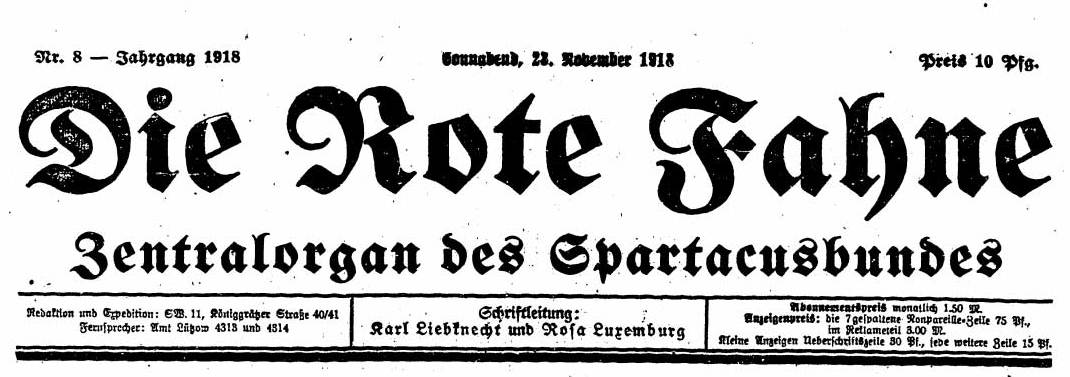
Die Rote Fahne, "Central organ of the Spartacus League", 23 November 1918.

Over the next few weeks the Spartacus League tried to influence political developments in this direction with its daily newspaper Die Rote Fahne (The Red Flag). In the first issue Rosa Luxemburg called for the nationwide abolition of the death penalty as a first step toward fundamental judicial and social reform. From 10 December she advocated a soviet republic and the controlled disarmament of soldiers by workers' councils. This was because on 6 December the first exchange of fire had occurred between Reich soldiers and the supporters of the USPD and the council movement. Behind the event was the secret 10 November 1918 Ebert-Groener pact in which the chairman of the interim government, Friedrich Ebert, had agreed with Quartermaster General Wilhelm Groener of the Supreme Army Command to take swift action against leftist uprisings in exchange for an assurance of the armed forces' loyalty to the new government. The 6 December fighting took place because Groener, in order to prevent power from being taken away from the Reich military, wanted to prevent the meeting of the Reich Congress of Workers' and Soldiers' Councils planned for 16 December in Berlin.

On 14 December Rosa Luxemburg published an article of policy in The Red Flag entitled "What Does the Spartacus League Want?" It stated:

The Spartacus League will never take over governmental power except in response to the clear, unambiguous will of the great majority of the proletarian mass of all of Germany, never except by the proletariat’s conscious affirmation of the views, aims, and methods of struggle of the Spartacus League. ... The victory of the Spartacus League comes not at the beginning, but at the end of the Revolution: it is identical with the victory of the great million-strong masses of the socialist proletariat.

The link to the council movement that emerged in 1918 and Rosa Luxemburg's theory of the spontaneity of the working class as the motor of revolution thus became the determining factors for the Spartacus League's theory of revolution.

At the Reich Congress of Workers' and Soldiers' Councils, only ten of 489 delegates represented the Spartacus League. Rosa Luxemburg and Karl Liebknecht were not even allowed to attend as guests. The majority of delegates voted to hold elections on 19 January 1919 for a constituent National Assembly. A disappointed Rosa Luxemburg described the congress as a "willing tool of the counterrevolution". The congress's results accelerated the Spartacists' drive to break away from the USPD and form their own party.

=== Founding of the KPD ===
On 24 December 1918 Friedrich Ebert attempted to disband and dismiss the People's Navy Division (Volksmarinedivision), which had been assigned to protect the interim government. The resulting confrontation at the Berlin Palace between it and units of the Reich military caused 67 deaths. The three USPD representatives on the Council of the People's Deputies blamed Ebert and, unaware of his secret agreement with Groener, saw his actions as an attempt to block the revolutionary goals they had jointly agreed on. They therefore resigned from the interim government on 29 December 1918.

Because of Ebert's actions and the behavior of the USPD, which was criticized as fickle and inconsistent, the Spartacus League decided on 22 December 1918 to hold a Reich congress in Berlin on 30 December to discuss the founding of a party, the relationship to the USPD, and parliamentary elections. In the interim it had delegates elected from throughout Germany. Many arrived in Berlin as early as 29 December, and on the same day a majority of them decided to found a new party. Above all, the Polish guest Karl Radek convinced most of the representatives of the Spartacus League, the Bremen left-wing radicals and the International Communists of Germany (IKD) of the prospects and the necessity of unifying. In doing so Radek contradicted the central statement of the Spartacus program that the party would take over the government only through the clear will of a majority of the population. Radek said that a proletarian revolution always begins with a minority seizing political power.

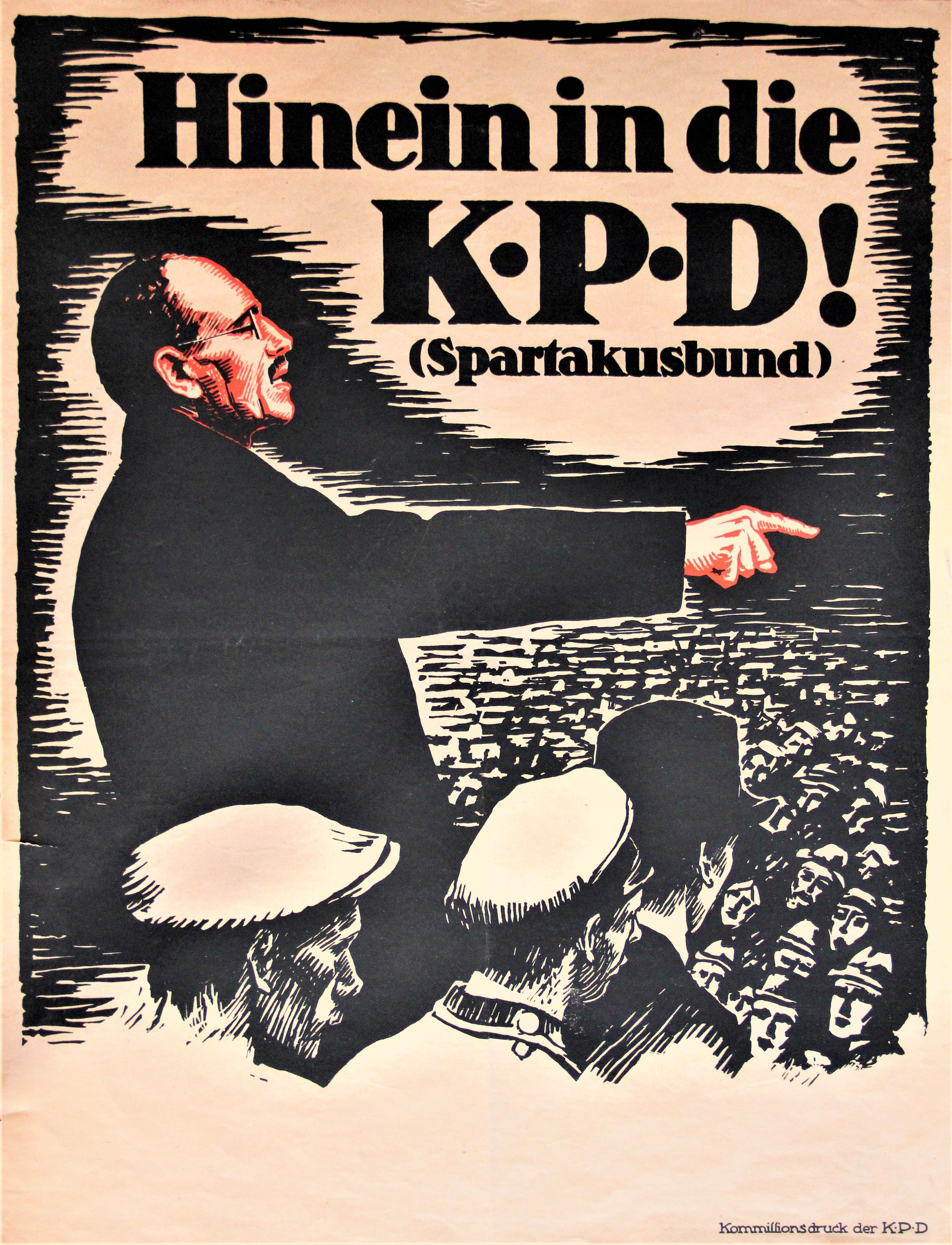
Poster urging people to join the KPD (Spartacus League). The figure addressing the crowd is Karl Liebknecht.

On 31 December 1918, 127 delegates, including 94 Spartacists and 29 IKD representatives, decided to unite to form the "Communist Party of Germany (Spartacus League)". Negotiations with the Revolutionary Stewards for their admission failed in part because Liebknecht did not want to drop the supplementary "Spartacus League" from the party name. Rosa Luxemburg had argued for "Socialist Party" in order to preserve the independence of German communists from the Bolsheviks and to facilitate their cooperation with other socialists.

In addition to the party name, its relationship to parliamentarianism was highly controversial. The leading Spartacus members Rosa Luxemburg, Paul Levi, Leo Jogiches, Käte Duncker, and hesitantly also Karl Liebknecht, were in favor of the KPD participating in the upcoming elections. Otto Rühle and the IKD, on the other hand, strongly opposed participation. Their motion to boycott the elections received a majority of 62 votes to 23. The majority of the party congress shared the view formulated by Liebknecht a week earlier: "The National Assembly means nothing other than a formal political democracy. It does not at all mean that democracy which socialism has always demanded. The ballot is certainly not the lever by which the power of the capitalist social order can be unhinged."

=== Spartacist uprising ===
On 5 January 1919, the Berlin armaments factories' Revolutionary Stewards, who had organized the January strike the previous year, instigated an armed uprising in protest against the dismissal of Berlin Police President Emil Eichhorn for refusing to use his forces against the People's Navy Division during the confrontation at the Berlin Palace. The KPD joined the call to action. It attempted to involve the soldiers' councils of the Berlin regiments in the overthrow of Friedrich Ebert's government in what came to be known as the Spartacist uprising. It failed when the Reich army that had assembled around Berlin, along with newly formed Freikorps units, put down the uprising on the orders of Gustav Noske (MSPD), the member of the Council of the People's Deputies who was responsible for military affairs. The restoration of peace and order was declared.

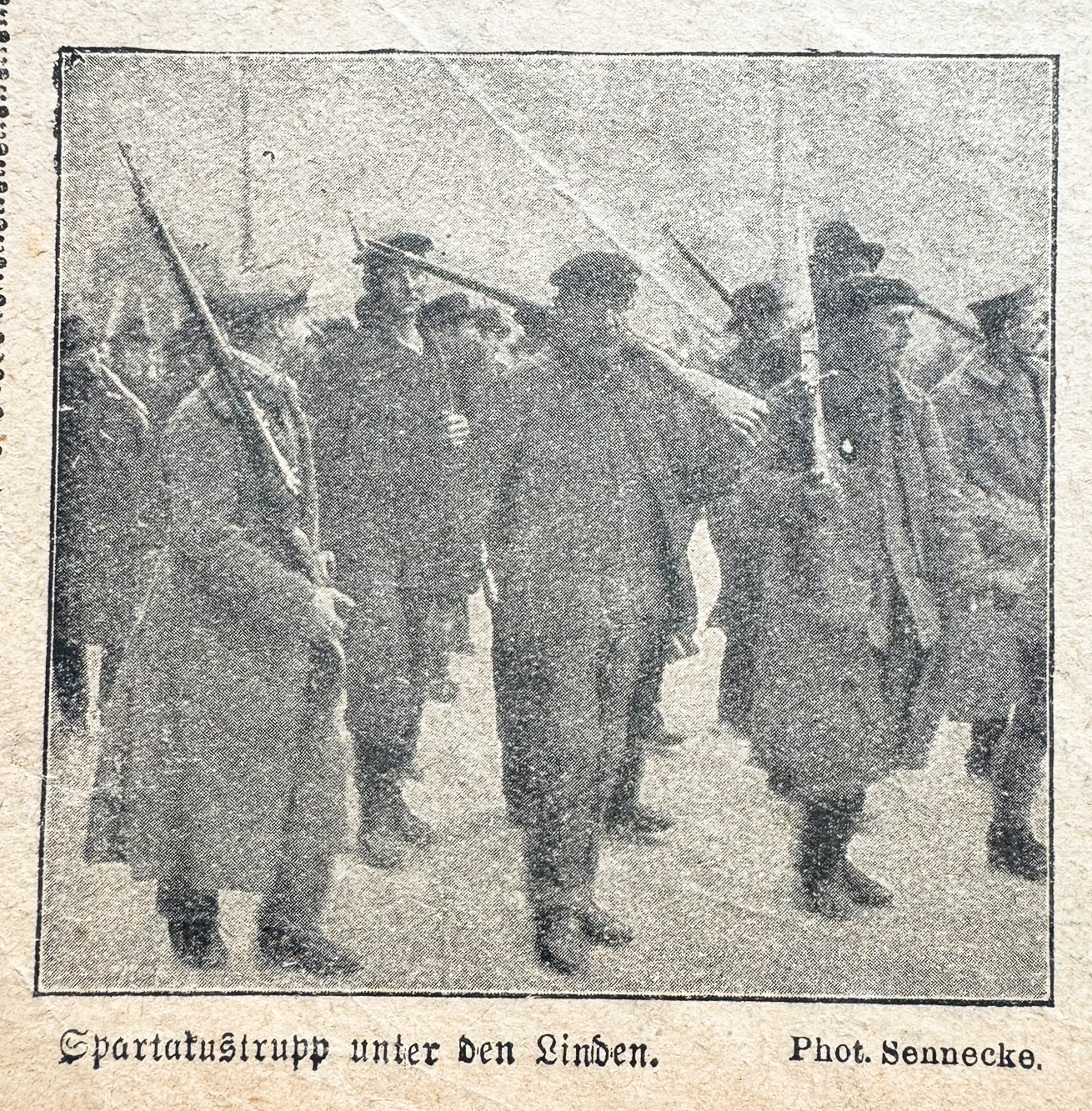
The Spartcus League in a show of force on Berlin's main thoroughfare

Immediately after this, on 14 January, Rosa Luxemburg wrote in Die Rote Fahne:

“Order prevails in Warsaw!” “Order prevails in Paris!” “Order prevails in Berlin!” Every half-century that is what the bulletins from the guardians of “order” proclaim from one center of the world-historic struggle to the next. And the jubilant “victors” fail to notice that any “order” that needs to be regularly maintained through bloody slaughter heads inexorably toward its historic destiny; its own demise.

[...]

“Order prevails in Berlin!” You foolish lackeys! Your “order” is built on sand. Tomorrow the revolution will “rise up again, clashing its weapons,” and to your horror it will proclaim with trumpets blazing:

I was, I am, I shall be!

On 15 January the two most important Spartacists and KPD leaders, Rosa Luxemburg and Karl Liebknecht were captured and murdered by members of the Freikorps Guard Cavalry Rifle Division. Freikorps officer Waldemar Pabst gave this order, who stated that the order was received from Gustav Noske in agreement with SPD leader Fredrich Ebert

Franz Mehring died at the end of January 1919 and in March 1919 Leo Jogiches was murdered in prison after being arrested while investigating the deaths of Luxemburg and Liebknecht. With the deaths of four of the founders of the Spartacus League, its history came to an end.

Anti-Spartacus poster. It reads: "Spartacus at work… Association for Combating Bolshevism".

== Reception ==
=== Until 1945 ===
The Spartacus League had advocated the solidarity of all revolutionary forces and a permanent commitment to the goals of the Communist Manifesto. Until the founding of the KPD, it saw itself as part of a class-conscious international social democracy which rests on the shoulders of the working mass of the people, meaning that working class organizations needed to express and enforce its will. The Spartacus League's founders had therefore criticized both the reformism of the majority social democrats and Lenin's one-party system and its tendencies toward a state bureaucracy after Russia's October Revolution.

In March 1919 the KPD became a member of the Communist International, which at that time was dominated by the Bolsheviks, and from then on followed its political line more closely. After Lenin's death, the KPD leadership increasingly followed Stalin's ideological course and excluded his critics, including former Spartacists such as Paul Levi, August Thalheimer, Heinrich Brandler and others. The "left opposition", the council-communist Communist Workers Party of Germany and the General Workers Union, since they were united in their rejection of Stalinism, united in 1926 to form the "Spartacus League of Left Communist Organizations", also called "Spartacus League No. 2". Its attempt to unite radical left-wing groups as an alternative to the KPD achieved only further fragmentation.

In 1919 the SPD and its press organs portrayed the Spartacus League as an offshoot of the Bolsheviks and the originator of uprisings and attempted coups. They invoked the danger of Bolshevism as something that had to be fought, even militarily, in order to save democracy. Although the Spartacus League had neither created, organized nor led the soviet movement and had no real options for attaining power, conservative and radical right-wing parties also shared the SPD's view, with the result that it became the prevalent one in the Weimar Republic.

=== German Democratic Republic ===
The historiography of the German Democratic Republic (East Germany) found the Spartacus League and its politics controversial. In 1938 Stalin classified the November 1918 Revolution in Germany as a "bourgeois" rather than a socialist revolution, devalued the councils of the time as "compliant tools of the bourgeois parliament" and held them responsible for the failure of the revolution. The leadership of the East German Communist Party followed the prescriptions from the time of its founding and thus did not interpret the Spartacus League as a revolutionary party, but rather emphasized its weaknesses and organizational shortcomings. In this way it justified the necessity of a centralized cadre party for a successful revolution. Otto Grotewohl held the MSPD primarily responsible for the failure of the November Revolution and the Weimar Republic. The Spartacus League and the KPD had committed "tactical", not strategic, mistakes.

=== Federal Republic of Germany ===
In West Germany the strongest influence of the Spartacus League was on the student movement of the 1960s. After its expulsion from the SPD in 1961, the majority of the Socialist German Student League (SDS) held a Marxist-Leninist view of history in which the Soviet Union, East Germany and the East German Communist Party sought to realize the goals of the Spartacus League. They saw and attempted to use pending educational and social reforms and opposition to the Vietnam War as a learning ground for building a new radical democratic international. The West German extra-parliamentary opposition took its cue from historical attempts at council democracy and, like the Spartacists and other Marxists, regarded it as a form of direct democracy superior to parliamentarianism. After its peak years in the sixties, the West German student movement continued to make use of the Spartacus name although it often had little relationship to the original Spartacus League.

== Prominent members ==
- Willi Budich
- Hermann Duncker
- Käte Duncker
- Hugo Eberlein
- George Grosz
- Fritz Heckert
- Leo Jogiches
- Paul Lange
- Paul Levi
- Karl Liebknecht
- Rosa Luxemburg
- Julian Marchlewski
- Franz Mehring
- Ernst Meyer
- Wilhelm Pieck
- August Thalheimer
- Clara Zetkin

== See also ==
- Roter Soldatenbund (Red Soldiers' League), the Spartacus League's paramilitary

== English language sources ==
- Ottokar Luban, The Role of the Spartacist Group after 9 November 1918 and the Formation of the KPD, in: Ralf Hoffrogge and Norman LaPorte (eds.), Weimar Communism as Mass Movement 1918–1933, London: Lawrence & Wishart, 2017, pp. 45–65.
- William A. Pelz, The Spartakusbund and the German Working Class Movement, 1914–1919, Lewiston [N.Y.]: E. Mellen Press, 1988.
- Eric D. Weitz, "'Rosa Luxemburg Belongs to Us!'" German Communism and the Luxemburg Legacy, Central European History, Vol. 27, No. 1 (1994), pp. 27–64
- Eric D. Weitz, Creating German Communism, 1890–1990: From Popular Protests to Socialist State. Princeton, NJ: Princeton University Press, 1997
- David Priestand, Red Flag: A History of Communism, New York: Grove Press, 2009
