= Prime House =

Historic house in New York, United States

- U.S. National Register of Historic Places
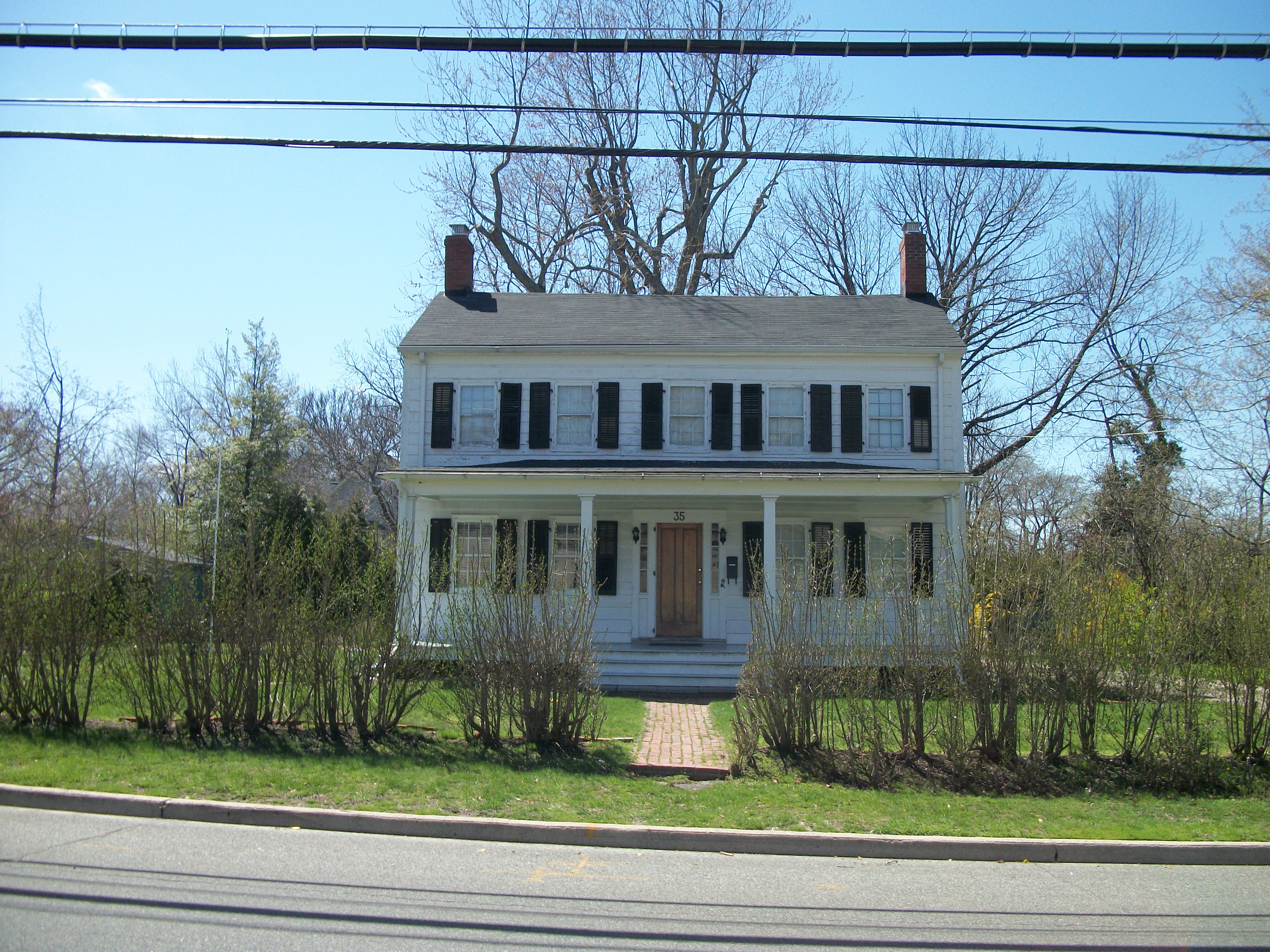
- The Ezra C. Prime House

- Location within New York Location within the United States
- Location: 35 Prime Avenue; Huntington, New York
- Coordinates: 40°52′26″N 73°25′23″W
- Area: less than one acre
- Built: 1855
- Architect: Prime, Ezra C.
- MPS: Huntington Town MRA
- NRHP reference No.: 85002568
- Added to NRHP: September 26, 1985

Prime House is a historic home located at Huntington in Suffolk County, New York. It is a 2 1/2-story, five-bay, gable-roofed clapboard structure with a shed roof rear extension. It was built as a two-family workers' residence in 1855 and was representative of the late settlement period of Huntington. The house is next door to the Prime-Octagon House, and across the street from the Heckscher Museum of Art.

It was added to the National Register of Historic Places in 1985.
