= Prime–Octagon House =

Historic house in New York, United States

- U.S. National Register of Historic Places
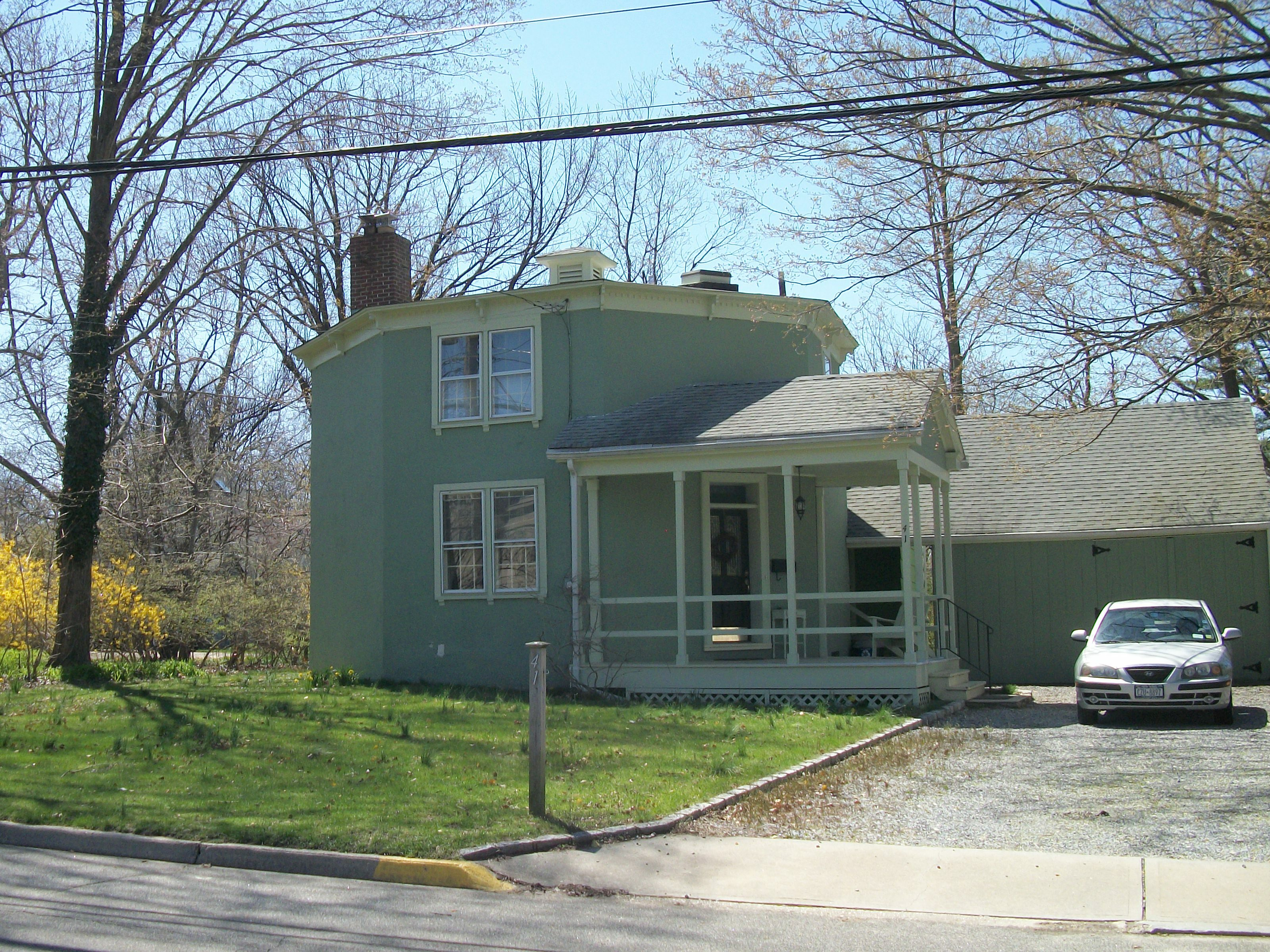
- Prime–Ocatgon House

- Location within New York Location within the United States
- Interactive map showing the location of Prime-Octagon House
- Location: 41 Prime Avenue; Huntington, New York
- Coordinates: 40°52′28″N 73°25′23″W
- Area: less than one acre
- Built: 1859
- Architectural style: Octagon House
- MPS: Huntington Town MRA
- NRHP reference No.: 85002569
- Added to NRHP: September 26, 1985

The Prime–Octagon House, built in 1859, is a historic octagonal house located at 41 Prime Avenue in Huntington, Suffolk County, New York.The house is next door to the 1855-built Prime House, and across the street from the Heckscher Museum of Art.

On September 26, 1985, it was added to the National Register of Historic Places.
