= Eclipse of the Sun (Grosz) =

1926 painting by George Grosz

- Artist: George Grosz
- Year: 1926
- Medium: Oil on canvas
- Dimensions: 207.3 cm × 182.6 cm (81.6 in × 71.9 in)
- Location: Heckscher Museum of Art, Huntington

Eclipse of the Sun is an oil-on-canvas painting by German artist George Grosz, painted in 1926. It is held at the Heckscher Museum of Art, in Huntington, New York, where it is the most famous painting.

== Description ==
The painting represents Grosz's harsh indictment of the political and economical realities of Germany during the Weimar Republic, specially the economic interests that dominated the new regime. It depicts several characters around a table before the backdrop of a burning city. The central figure is President Paul von Hindenburg, recognizable by his long mustache and his military uniform with medals. He sits with bared teeth, wearing an ironic laurel wreath on his head. A bloodied sword and a funerary cross on the table in front of Hindenburg are a reminder of his role in World War I, and the lives lost. Four headless financiers are also at the table, in formal attire. A corpulent industrialist, with a top hat, and with small weaponry and a miniature train under his arm, whispers discreetly at the President's ear. The implication is that the headless men cannot think for themselves, and simply obey the commands of the capitalists and the military.

A donkey, wearing blinders decorated with the German eagle, stands facing a feeding trough full of papers while balancing on a board tied to a skeleton. The donkey is interpreted by art historian Ivo Kranzfelder as a symbol of the German people, represented as accepting whatever is put in front of them. At the right, one of the headless men rests his foot on the prison bars below him, through which a prisoner's face is seen. At the top left is a darkened sun illuminated by the American dollar sign. This is a reference to the investment of American finance in the German economy after World War I.

== History ==
The painting was brought by Grosz to the United States when he moved there in 1933. It was thought lost but was found at the home of a house painter, Thomas Constantine, who had kept it rolled up in his garage for several years. When it was found, it was exhibited at the Harbor Gallery in Cold Spring Harbor. A fund-raising effort by the Heckscher Museum of Art's first professional director led to the museum's acquisition of the painting for $15,000 in 1968.
