= Friedrich Westmeyer =

German trade unionist and politician (1873–1917)

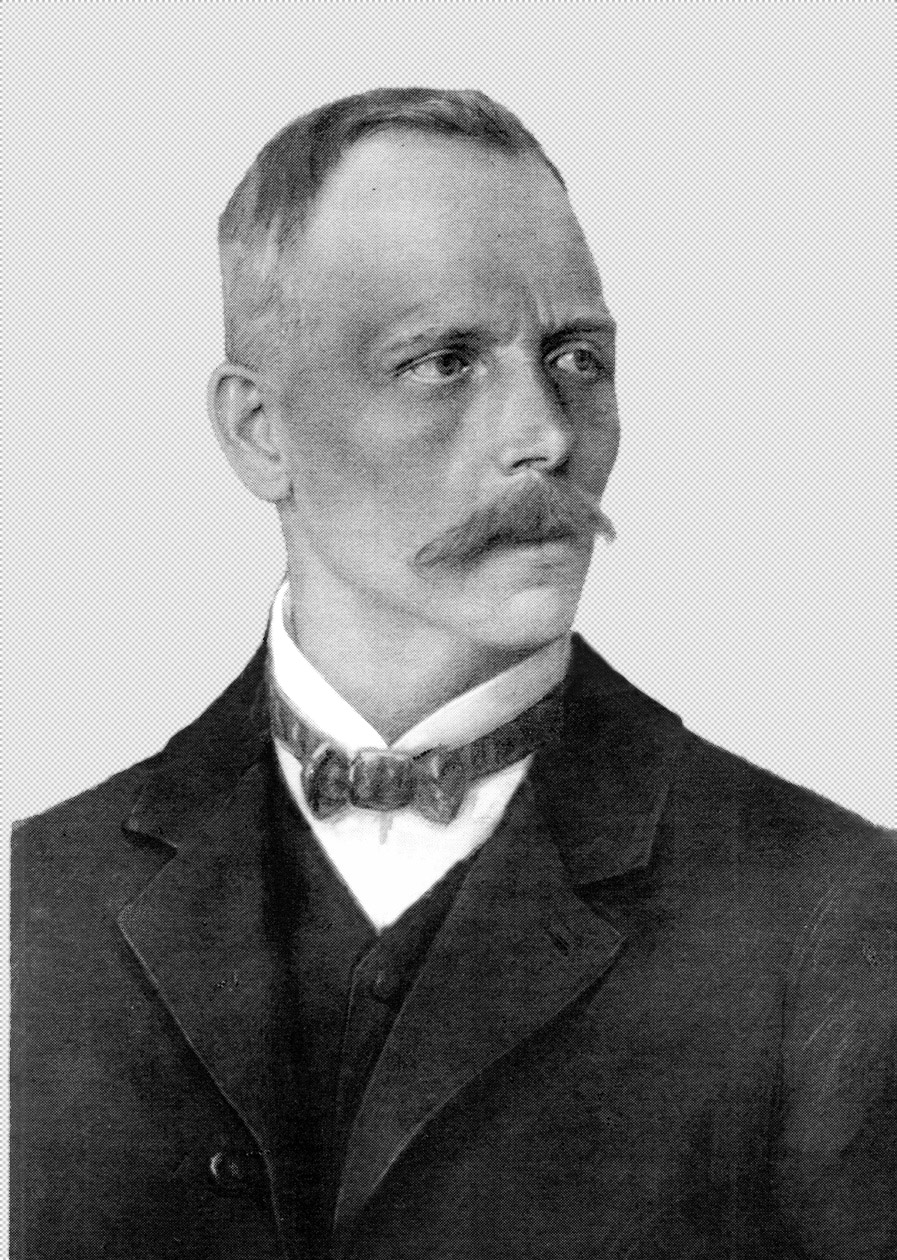
- Friedrich Westmeyer, Stuttgart, 1914

Member of the Estates of Württemberg for Stuttgart
- In office 9 January 1913 – 14 November 1917

Personal details
- Born: 14 January 1873 Osnabrück, German Empire
- Died: 14 November 1917 (aged 44) France
- Party: Social Democratic Party of Germany

Military service
- Allegiance: German Empire
- Branch/service: Imperial German Army
- Years of service: 1917
- Battles/wars: World War I; Western Front †

Johann Friedrich "Fritz" Westmeyer (14 January 1873 – 14 November 1917) was a German trade unionist and socialist politician. He stands out as one of the more radical members of the Social Democratic Party of Germany (SPD) in imperial Germany.

== Biography ==
The second youngest of five children, Westmeyer was born in Osnabrück in 1873. Westmeyer's father, a bricklayer, died during his childhood. Educated at Osnabrück schools, Westmeyer worked as a chimney sweep and became a trade unionist and member of the Social Democratic Party of Germany (SPD) in the 1890s.

Westmeyer began working for the SPD press in Nuremberg in 1896. He relocated to Hannover to work for the Volkswill in 1902, and attended the International Socialist Congress in Amsterdam in 1904. He was arrested for his work on the Volkswill and received a three-month prison sentence for blasphemy in 1905. Westmeyer spent the subsequent years as an activist and organizer in Stuttgart, where he became a close ally of Clara Zetkin, an influential Marxist who would become a leading member of the Spartacist League, the Independent Social Democratic Party of Germany (USPD), and the Communist Party of Germany (KPD) after the collapse of the German Empire in the First World War. He ran as a candidate for the Reichstag in 1907, was elected to lead the Social Democratic Association in Stuttgart in 1908-1914, and edited the Schwäbische Tagwacht. He was elected to serve as a member of the Württemberg Landtag in 1912-1917.

Westmeyer joined Zetkin, August Thalheimer, and others of the so-called "left-wing" of the SPD in taking an anti-war line during World War I and opposed the SPD leadership's support of the Kaiser's war. Westmeyer's radicalism during the war led to his expulsion from the Social Democratic faction of Württemberg's Landtag in 1915, and he joined Franz Engelhardt and Ferdinand Hoschka in establishing the Sozialistische Vereinigung, a rival legislative faction.

Westmeyer participated on 19 March 1916 at the Reich Conference of the Gruppe Internationale, later named the Spartakusbund, which he participated in Berlin.

Arrested by the authorities along with other significant Württemberg SPD radicals, Westmeyer was forcibly mobilized into imperial Germany's wartime army and sent to carry out his service on the Western Front despite his age and opposition to the war. He died at a military hospital near the front in Rethel, France, in 1917.
