= Fit for Active Service =

Fit for Active Service (also known as The Faith Healers) is a drawing by 20th-century German artist George Grosz, created between 1916 and 1917. It is considered a seminal part of the post-World War I movement, Neue Sachlichkeit, or New Objectivity. The medium is pen, brush, and ink on paper.

== Interpretation ==
Fit for Active Service depicts a bare skeleton being judged as physically fit for conscription (the military doctor declares: "KV," which abbreviates kriegsverwendungsfähig, or "fit for active service"). The German soldiers and military doctors around the conscript are well-rounded, some with dispositions of indifference, some grinning. The industrial smokestacks in the background windows are characteristic of Modernist and avant-garde art, symbolic of the social disillusion associated with rapid industrialization and urbanization. The military doctor dons the Iron Cross, a military medal awarded for bravery and leadership, debased by its often wide and undeserved distribution during the First World War.

== Techniques ==
The cartoon-like nature of the piece carried political and social overtones. Grosz drew what is essentially a sketch, alluding to the primitive nature of conscription. Some of the surrounding soldiers are drawn in the composite view, again suggesting the overt superficialness of war and society. The simplicity of the line drawing "contributes to the directness and immediacy of the work, which scathingly portrays the German Army." The cartoon gains credibility by including a tone of malicious humor, despite the traumatic and horrible subject matter, and it also establishes the viewer as a passive observer, perhaps as one of the German soldiers.

== Association with Neue Sachlichkeit (New Objectivity) ==
George Grosz was drafted by the German military upon the initial outbreak of World War I. He was able to avoid conscription, though, after having been deemed unfit for duty. In 1917, however, he was sent to an insane asylum, where he was examined by doctors and judged as fit for active service. He was later discharged, after having attempted suicide.

The scene depicted in Fit for Active Service connotes trauma and horror of Grosz's own war experience. He reported:

Of course, there was a kind of mass enthusiasm at the start. But this intoxication soon evaporated, leaving a huge vacuum... And then after a few years when everything bogged down, when we were defeated, when everything went to pieces, all that remained at least for me and most of my friends, were disgust and horror.

Although he was originally associated with Dadaism, his art is now referred to as art of the New Objectivity movement, a post-war movement in which veterans of World War I communicated the horror, destruction, and trauma of the war.
