= Martha Arendsee =

German politician (1885–1953)

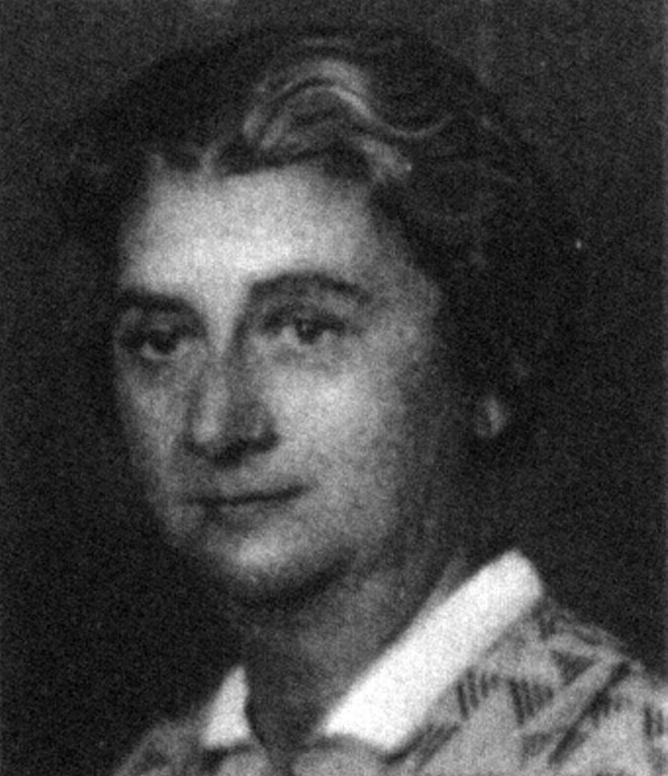
Arendsee c. 1928

Hulda Martha Arendsee (29 March 1885 – 22 May 1953) was a German politician (KPD) and women's rights activist.

== Life ==
=== Early years ===
Martha Arendsee was born in Wedding, a quarter to the northwest of central Berlin. Her father was a type-setter and print technician. On leaving school she undertook a commercial training. She became seriously physically handicapped after an operation when she was 18, and between 1903 and 1910 she was restricted to working at home.

=== Politics ===
Arendsee became politically engaged early on. She joined the Social Democratic Party (Sozialdemokratische Partei Deutschlands / SPD) in 1906, and within it was responsible for "Women work" in Berlin between 1907 and 1916. In 1907 she also joined a trades union, also becoming a member of the precursor to the "Revolutionary Union Opposition" organisation. Between 1910 and 1919 she was employed by the Co-Op in Berlin, latterly in charge of the wages and social security department. During the First World War she accompanied Clara Zetkin to the International Women's Congress at Bern in 1915.

=== Party splits ===
After 1914, she was one of those who came into conflict with the SPD party leadership over the party truce agreed between the political parties for the duration of the war: when the SPD split she was a member of the breakaway faction which was launched in 1917 as the Independent Social Democratic Party (Unabhängige Sozialdemokratische Partei Deutschlands / USPD), becoming a member of the new party's Berlin leadership team ("Bezirksvorstand"). In Berlin she participated in the revolutionary turmoil that followed national military defeat. When the USPD itself split in 1920, Arendsee was a strong advocate for the political regrouping which led to the creation of the Communist Party, of which she was a member from 1920.

=== Prussian parliament, National parliament ===
In 1919, an election was held for a Prussian Regional assembly which would be mandated to draw up a new constitution. Instead of the election taking place under a traditional indirect process, a system of proportional representation was used, whereby party representation reflected directly the number of votes cast. Martha Arendsee's name was on the USPD candidate list, positioned high enough up for her to become one of the party's 24 members in 401 seat assembly. (She was also one of just 26 successful female candidates.) She then sat as a member of the assembly, and following the 1921 election, of its successor body, the Prussian regional parliament ("Landtag") until 1924, latterly as one of the a Communist Party members.

In the second national election of 1924 she was included on the Communist Party list which resulted in her being elected to the national parliament (Reichstag). She was re-elected in 1928.

=== Activism ===
During the 1920s, Arendsee also wrote for various Communist publications, notably between 1922 and 1924 when she was responsible for "Die Kommunistin" ("The [Female] Communist") and then between 1928 and 1933 when she edited "Proletarische Sozialpolitik" ("Proletarian Social Policy"). From 1925 she also devoted much time to the Workers International Relief organisation, originally set up in 1921 to organise famine relief for the German ethnic population in the Soviet Union, and by 1925 a permanent Soviet sponsored Communist Welfare organisation based in Berlin.

Fierce rivalry at the top of the Communist Party in Moscow, which in the Kremlin resulted in the removal from positions of influence of Josef Stalin's principal rivals, had its direct equivalent in the German Communist Party, which had close fraternal links with Moscow. Arendsee's closer allies within the party leadership included the former party chairman August Thalheimer and Heinrich Brandler, who were not unreservedly supportive of Stalin's actions, and found themselves identified as members of the party right wing. With Stalinist hardliners in the ascendant within the German party, Arendsee was no longer included on the party's candidate list for the 1930 national election. She continued to apply herself to work with the Workers International Relief organisation, however, and is listed as a member of its national executive between 1931 and 1935

=== Régime change and exile ===
The political backdrop changed dramatically in January 1933 when the Nazis took power and converted Germany into a one-party dictatorship. Political activity (except in support of the Nazi party) became illegal. Arendsee was arrested in April 1933 and held in "protective custody" at the Barnimstrasse women's prison in Berlin in till September 1933. In April or May 1934 she emigrated via Prague and Paris to Moscow, where she joined her partner (described in some sources as her husband) Paul Schwenk who had already escaped from Germany to Paris in April 1933, in the aftermath of the Reichstag fire. In Moscow she undertook a succession of party and welfare related jobs, working at one stage in the socio-economic department of Profintern. She was also active in the leadership of "Foreign Workers' Clubs". From 1941 she also worked for Radio Moscow. For most of the time in Moscow she lived with Paul Schwenk. However, he was one of the many who fell foul of the dictator's paranoia, and he was arrested as a spy in 1937. He was released again on 13 January 1941, which according to one source was achieved through the efforts of his wife and friends. While Schwenk was locked away in the dungeons of the NKVD Ardensee's existence in Moscow was a relatively isolated one. 1941 was the year in which the non-aggression pact with Nazi Germany broke down when the German army invaded the Soviet Union. Between 1941 and 1943 Arendsee was evacuated to Engels, far to the southeast of Moscow. In 1943 she was one of the co-founders - according to one source the only female among them - of the Soviet sponsored National Committee for a Free Germany (Nationalkomitee Freies Deutschland / NKVD), an organisation for which she worked till 1945.

=== Soviet occupation zone ===
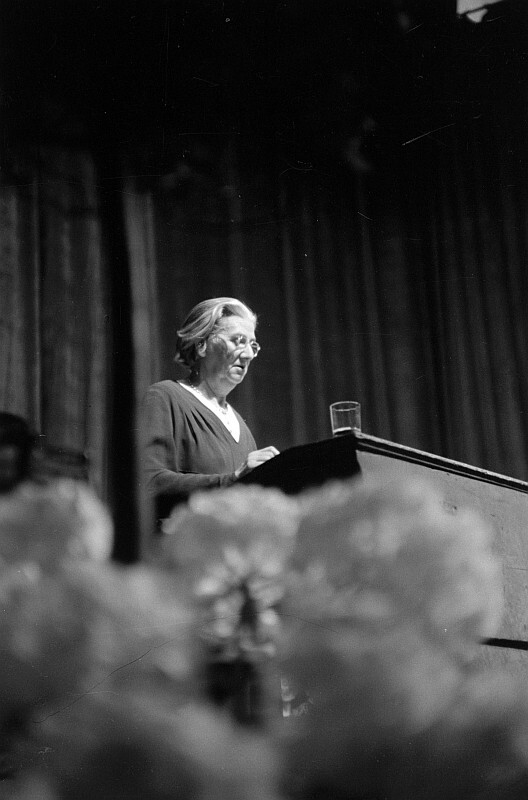
Arendsee gives a speech at the Deutsches Theater in East Berlin, May 1947

War ended in May 1945, and Paul Schwenk was among those able to return to Berlin from Moscow at the end of that same month. Martha Arendsee arrived early in June, with a group that also included Wilhelm Pieck. The entire region surrounding Berlin was now administered as the Soviet occupation zone, within which Martha Arendsee occupied a seat on the party executive ("Parteivorstand") - later the Central Committee - of the Communist Party. Following the contentious party merger that gave rise to the Socialist Unity Party ("Sozialistische Einheitspartei Deutschlands" /SED) in April 1946, she retained her Central Committee membership in the new party for a period.

Back in Berlin she resumed her focus on women's issues. In August 1945 she became a member of the main Women's Committee with the Berlin city administration ("Berliner Magistrat"). Between 1945 and 1948 she headed up the Social Policy department of the Trades Union Federation (Freier Deutscher Gewerkschaftsbund / FDGB). Around 1950 she resigned from her municipal responsibilities on health grounds.

Martha Arendee died in Berlin on 22 May 1953.

== Honours ==
Martha Arendee's retirement came shortly after the Soviet occupation zone had been relaunched, in October 1949, as the Soviet sponsored German Democratic Republic, and she died before the new country's elaborate honours system had become fully established, but the regime nevertheless found ways to honour her memory.

In 1975, on what would have been her ninetieth birthday, her face appeared on a celebratory postage stamp. Three years later, in 1978, a few months after celebrations marking the twenty-fifth anniversary of her death, a street in Berlin-Marzahn - then a large and prestigious newly built city district - was named after her. A nearby retirement home still carries her name.
