= Willi Budich =

German politician (1890–1938)

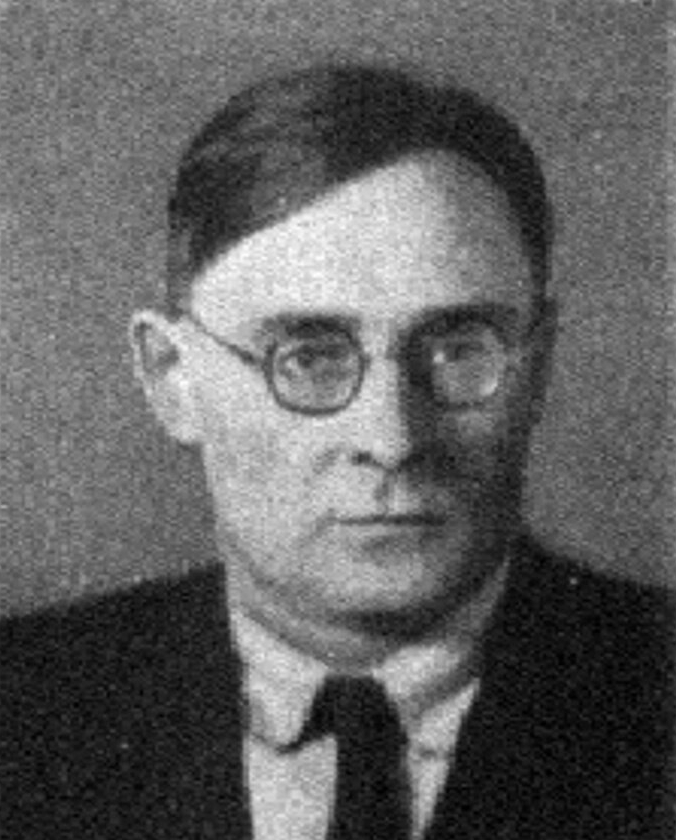
- Budich c. 1932

Chairman of the Roter Soldatenbund
- In office 15 November 1918 – 12 January 1919
- Preceded by: Position established
- Succeeded by: Position abolished

Member of the Reichstag for Reichswahlvorschlag
- In office 6 December 1932 – 28 February 1933
- Preceded by: Multi-member district
- Succeeded by: Constituency abolished

Personal details
- Born: 16 April 1890 Cottbus, Province of Brandenburg, Kingdom of Prussia, German Empire
- Died: 22 March 1938 (aged 47) Moscow, Soviet Union
- Cause of death: Execution by shooting
- Party: SPD (1910–1917); USPD (1917–1919); KPD (after 1919)
- Other party: Spartacus League (1914–1918)
- Spouse: Luba Gerbilskaya (m. 1923)
- Children: Irene; Leonie
- Education: Mittweida Technical College
- Occupation: Politician; Revolutionary

Military service
- Allegiance: German Empire; Revolutionaries; Russian SFSR
- Branch/service: Imperial German Army; Spartacus League; Red Army
- Years of service: 1914–1918; 1918; 1920–1921
- Battles/wars: World War I; Western Front (WIA); German Revolution (WIA); Russian Civil War

Willi Budich (16 April 1890 – 22 March 1938) was a German communist politician who served as chairman of the Roter Soldatenbund ("Red Soldiers' League"), the paramilitary of the Spartacus League, during the German Revolution of 1918–1919. He also served one term in the Reichstag from 1932 to 1933.

== Biography ==
Budich was born in Cottbus on 16 April 1890, the son of a Sorbian farmer and innkeeper. After attending volksschule, he trained as a locksmith. Later, he studied engineering for five semesters at the Mittweida Technical College, without graduating. From 1914, he served as a gunner in the First World War and was wounded several times.

Budich joined the Social Democratic Party of Germany (SPD) in 1910. In 1917, he switched to the Independent Social Democratic Party of Germany (USPD). After the founding of the Spartacus League in the autumn of 1917, Budich (under the pseudonym Brandt) was one of the League's most active organizers in Berlin in the following months and a close associate of Leo Jogiches. In March 1918, Budich was arrested. He was released as a result of the events of the November Revolution.

Following the revolution, Budich organized and led the Roter Soldatenbund ("Red Soldiers' League"), founded on 15 November 1918, and the newspaper The Red Soldier, which called for the exclusion of officers from the soldiers' councils.

In December 1918, Budich participated in the fighting taking place in Berlin between left-wing revolutionaries and the newly formed government Freikorps. On 6 December 1918, Budich was severely wounded in a skirmish and lost an arm, which prevented him from attending the founding congress of the Communist Party of Germany (KPD) held that same month. In June 1919, at the second (illegal) national conference of the KPD, he was put in charge of the party's special apparatus for intelligence gathering and combating spies.

In 1919, Budich was sent to Munich by Eugen Leviné of the KPD leadership in Berlin to participate in the establishment and defense of the Bavarian Soviet Republic, where he played a leading role as a member of the executive committee (under the codename Dietrich). Levine and Budich were also tasked with streamlining the organization of the Munich KPD.

In 1920, Budich co-authored the KPD's appeal to the workers during the Kapp-Lüttwitz Putsch. That same year, he traveled to the Soviet Union, where he received advanced military training and fought in the Russian Civil War on the side of the Red Army. After returning to Germany in 1921, Budich was arrested on 21 January 1922, along with Arkadi Maslow, but managed to escape and return to the Soviet Union. His role in the German October, a series of communist uprisings in Germany in 1923, remains unclear. However, it is assumed that he was the secret head of the KPD's Northeast Upper District (Mecklenburg-Danzig) in the early 1920s. In the following years, Budich lived in Moscow as secretary of the German section of the International Red Aid (IRH). From 1924, under the alias Gerbilski, he was director of the first Soviet trade mission in Vienna. In 1929, Budich, who had been married to Luba Gerbilskaya since 1923, returned to Germany. He then worked for a time as an editor for Die Rote Fahne (The Red Flag).

In the Reichstag elections of November 1932, Budich was elected to the Reichstag on the KPD's Reichswahlvorschlag (national list), where he served until March 1933. During one of the frequent violent riots in the Reichstag at that time, Budich suffered severe injuries that left him with a mobility impairment.

After the Nazi seizure of power, Budich, a veteran of the November Revolution and a communist member of the Reichstag, was persecuted. Following periods of imprisonment in penitentiaries and concentration camps, he emigrated to the Soviet Union via Prague in August 1933. However, mistreatment by members of the SA had left Budich permanently visually and hearing impaired. These injuries were most likely inflicted during his imprisonment in April 1933 at the SA prison on Papestraße in Berlin-Tempelhof.

His wife, who lived in Moscow, organized a campaign for his release through the International Red Aid and Elena Stasova. He was allowed to leave prison some time later, but the mistreatment he had suffered left him severely physically disabled and barely able to walk. His party comrades helped him escape in August 1933, traveling via Prague to Moscow. There he worked for the executive committee of the International Red Aid for several more years.

In 1936, during the Great Purge, he was arrested on the false charge of collaborating with the Gestapo. Budich was sentenced to death on 22 March 1938, and shot the same day.

== Legacy ==
On 28 March 1938, it was announced in the Deutscher Reichsanzeiger that Willy Budich, his wife Lubov Budich, née Gerbilskaya (born 1897 in Moscow) and his two daughters Irene (born 1924 in Moscow) and Leonie (born 1930 in Berlin) had their German citizenship revoked, their last address in Berlin being Gäßnerweg 57 in Tempelhof.

His rehabilitation only took place after Stalin's death in 1956. This occurred at the 20th Congress of the CPSU; on this occasion, he was also posthumously readmitted to the party.

== Honors ==
- On March 1, 1970, the 1st Aviation Technical Battalion (FTB-1) of the East German National People's Army (NVA) in Holzdorf-Ost was given the honorary name "Willi Budich."
- In 1981, a street in Cottbus was named after Willi Budich.
