= George Grosz =

German artist (1893–1959)

- George Grosz in 1921
- Born: Georg Ehrenfried Groß; July 26, 1893; Berlin, Kingdom of Prussia, German Empire
- Died: July 6, 1959 (aged 65); West Berlin, West Germany
- Education: Dresden Academy
- Known for: Painting, drawing
- Notable work: The Funeral (Dedicated to Oscar Panizza)
- Movement: Dada, Expressionism, New Objectivity

George Grosz (/ɡroʊs/; German: [ɡʁoːs]; born Georg Ehrenfried Groß; July 26, 1893 – July 6, 1959) was a German artist known especially for his caricatural drawings and paintings of Berlin life in the 1920s. He was a prominent member of the Berlin Dada and New Objectivity groups during the Weimar Republic. He emigrated to the United States in 1933, and became a naturalized citizen in 1938. Abandoning the style and subject matter of his earlier work, he exhibited regularly and taught for many years at the Art Students League of New York. In 1959 he returned to Berlin, where he died shortly afterwards.

== Early life and education ==
Grosz was born Georg Ehrenfried Groß in Berlin, Germany, the third child of a pub owner. His parents were devoutly Lutheran. Grosz grew up in the Pomeranian town of Stolp, Prussia/Free State of Prussia (now Słupsk, Poland). After his father's death in 1900, he moved to the Wedding district of Berlin with his mother and sisters. At the urging of his cousin, the young Grosz began attending a weekly drawing class taught by a local painter named Grot. Grosz developed his skills further by drawing meticulous copies of the drinking scenes of Eduard von Grützner, and by drawing imaginary battle scenes. He was expelled from school in 1908 for insubordination.

From 1909 to 1911, he studied at the Dresden Academy of Fine Arts, where his teachers were Richard Müller, Robert Sterl, Raphael Wehle, and Osmar Schindler. His first published drawing was in the satirical magazine Ulk in 1910. From 1912 until 1917 he studied at the Berlin College of Arts and Crafts under Emil Orlik. He began painting in oils in 1912.

In November 1914 Grosz volunteered for military service, in the hope that by thus preempting conscription he would avoid being sent to the front. He was given a discharge after hospitalization for sinusitis in 1915. In 1916 he changed the spelling of his name to "de-Germanise" and internationalise his name – thus Georg became "George" (an English spelling), while in his surname he replaced the German "ß" with its phonetic equivalent "sz". He did this as a protest against German nationalism and out of a romantic enthusiasm for America – a legacy of his early reading of the books of James Fenimore Cooper, Bret Harte and Karl May – that he retained for the rest of his life. His artist friend and collaborator Helmut Herzfeld likewise changed his name to John Heartfield at the same time.

In January 1917 Grosz was drafted for service, but in May he was discharged as permanently unfit.

== Political engagement (1918–1921) ==
Daum Marries Her Pedantic Automaton "George" in May 1920, mixed media on canvas, Berlinische Galerie

Following the November Revolution in the last months of 1918, Grosz joined the Spartacist League, which was renamed the Communist Party of Germany (KPD) in December 1918. He was arrested during the Spartakus uprising in January 1919, but escaped using fake identification documents. In 1920, he married Eva Peters.

In the same year, he published a collection of his drawings, titled Gott mit uns (lit."God [is] with us"), a satire on German society. Grosz was accused of insulting the army, which resulted in a 300 German Mark fine and the confiscation of the plates used to print the album. He also organised and exhibited at the First International Dada Fair.

Grosz was one of the founding members of the Workers' International Russian Famine Relief Committee, which was formed in Berlin in August 1921. Other members included Helen Crawfurd, Anatole France, Neil McLean MP and Upton Sinclair

== Trip to Russia (1922–1923) ==
In 1922, Grosz traveled to Russia with the Danish writer Martin Andersen Nexø. Upon their arrival in Murmansk, they were briefly arrested as spies. After their credentials were approved, they were allowed to continue their journey. Grosz met with several Bolshevik leaders such as Grigory Zinoviev, Karl Radek, and Vladimir Lenin. He also met the Constructivist artist Vladimir Tatlin. He went with Arthur Holitscher to meet Anatoly Lunacharsky with whom he discussed Proletkult. Grosz rejected the concept of "proletarian culture", arguing that the term proletarian meant uneducated and uncultured. He regarded artistic talent as a "gift of the muses", which a person may be lucky enough to be born with.

Grosz's six-month stay in the Soviet Union left him unimpressed by what he had seen. He ended his membership in the KPD in 1923, although his political positions were little changed.

== Later activities in Germany ==
His work was part of the painting event in the art competition at the 1928 Summer Olympics.

On December 10, 1928, he and his publisher Wieland Herzfelde were prosecuted and fined under charges of blasphemy and sacrilege for publishing two anticlerical drawings in his portfolio Hintergrund (Background). One depicted prisoners under assault from a minister who vomits grenades and weapons onto them, and another featured a crucified Christ wearing a World War I gas mask and combat boots.

According to historian David Nash, Grosz "publicly stated that he was neither Christian nor pacifist, but was actively motivated by an inner need to create these pictures". He and his publisher appealed twice, and were finally acquitted in 1929 by the Reichsgericht in Berlin. "The judge decided that it was not an offense to religion, but actually was an attack on militarism. The implication is that, from Grosz’s point of view, religion was being used as essentially an opiate of the masses to encourage soldiers to die for the state. 'Shut up and obey,' was the rubric associated with this," according to art critic Camille Paglia.

In 1942, Time magazine identified Grosz as a pacifist.

== Emigration to the U.S. ==
Bitterly anti-Nazi, Grosz left Germany shortly before Hitler came to power. In June 1932, he accepted an invitation to teach the summer semester at the Art Students League of New York. In October 1932, Grosz returned to Germany, but on January 12, 1933, he and his family emigrated to the United States. Their ship docked in New York on January 23, 1933, a week before Hitler came to power in Berlin. Grosz became a naturalized citizen of the U.S. in 1938, and made his home in Bayside, New York. In the 1930s he taught at the Art Students League, where one of his students was Romare Bearden, who was influenced by his style of collage. Grosz taught at the Art Students League until 1955. His other students included Joseph Glasco and Robert Cenedella, whom he mentored from 1957 to 1959.

In America, Grosz determined to make a clean break with his past, and changed his style and subject matter. He painted many watercolor landscapes and street scenes, but did not entirely stop producing anti-fascist works. He admired American illustrators, and contributed illustrations to Esquire and other American magazines. The death in a concentration camp of his friend Erich Mühsam motivated him to publish Interregnum (1936), a portfolio of photolithographs reproducing drawings made between 1919 and 1936. Both the portfolio and his paintings sold poorly, and he became increasingly discouraged.

In 1946 Grosz published his autobiography, Ein kleines Ja und ein großes Nein, first translated as A Little Yes and a Big No. In the same year, he had a retrospective exhibition in New York titled A Piece of My World in a World without Peace.

From 1947 to 1959, George Grosz lived in Huntington, New York, where he taught painting at the Huntington Township Art League. It is said by Huntington locals that he used what was to become his most famous painting, Eclipse of the Sun (1926), to pay for a car repair bill, in his relative penury. The painting was later acquired by house painter Tom Constantine to settle a debt of $104.00. In the 1950s he opened a private art school at his home and also worked as Artist in Residence at the Des Moines Art Center. Grosz was elected into the National Academy of Design as an Associate Academician in 1950. In 1954 he was elected to the American Academy of Arts and Letters.

== Personal life and death ==
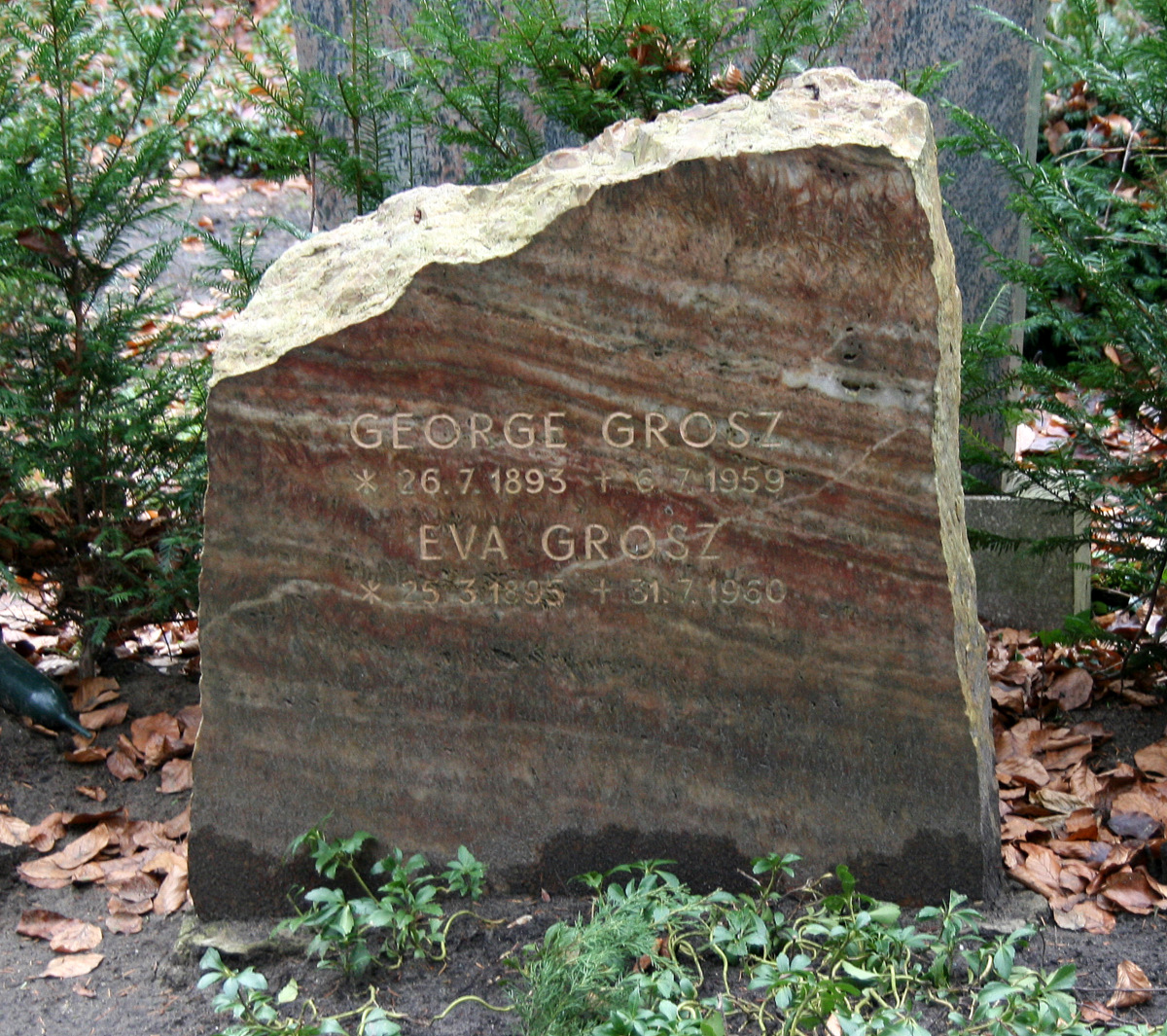
Grosz's tomb in the Friedhof Heerstraße, Berlin

On May 26, 1920, Grosz married Eva Louise Peter, with whom he had two sons, Peter Michael Grosz (1926–2006), a historian of early German aviation, and Marty Grosz (born 1930), a jazz guitarist.

Grosz resolved to return to Berlin, and relocated there in May 1959. He died there on July 6, 1959, from the effects of falling down a flight of stairs after a night of drinking.

== Work ==
Although Grosz made his first oil paintings in 1912 while still a student, his earliest oils that can be identified date from 1916. By 1914, Grosz worked in a style influenced by Expressionism and Futurism, as well as by popular illustration, graffiti, and children's drawings. Sharply outlined forms are often treated as if transparent. The City (1916–17) was the first of his many paintings of the modern urban scene. Other examples include the apocalyptic Explosion (1917), Metropolis (1917), and The Funeral, a 1918 painting depicting a mad funeral procession. He settled in Berlin in 1918 and was a founder of the Berlin Dada movement, using his satirical drawings to attack bourgeois supporters of the Weimar Republic.

His drawings, usually in pen and ink which he sometimes developed further with watercolor, frequently included images of Berlin and the Weimar Republic in the 1920s. Corpulent businessmen, wounded soldiers, prostitutes, sex crimes and orgies were his great subjects (for example, see Fit for Active Service). His draftsmanship was excellent although the works for which he is best known adopt a deliberately crude form of caricature in the style of Jugend. His oeuvre includes a few absurdist works, such as Remember Uncle August the Unhappy Inventor which has buttons sewn on it, and also includes a number of erotic artworks. George Grosz served as the illustrator for Carlyle-Wicksteed translation of the Divine Comedy published by the Illustrated Modern Library. His illustrations, mostly monotone drawings, are spread throughout the three books' cantos and typically depict scenes of torment and punishment in Inferno and many angels in Purgatorio and Paradiso.

After his emigration to the USA in 1933, Grosz "sharply rejected [his] previous work, and caricature in general", for he came to believe that "life and death ... are great subjects – not to be approached with mockery and cheap jokes." In place of his earlier corrosive vision of the city, he now painted conventional nudes and many landscape watercolors. In his autobiography, he wrote: "A great deal that had become frozen within me in Germany melted here in America and I rediscovered my old yearning for painting. I carefully and deliberately destroyed a part of my past." Although a softening of his style had been apparent since the late 1920s, Grosz's work assumed a more sentimental tone in America, a change generally seen as a decline. More acerbic works, such as Cain, or Hitler in Hell (1944) and his Stickmen series, whose emaciated figures resemble works by Giacometti, were the exceptions. His late work never achieved the critical success of his Berlin years.

In 1968, the Heckscher Museum of Art in Huntington purchased the painting Eclipse of the Sun for $15,000.00, raising the money by public subscription. As it portrays the warmongering of arms manufacturers, this painting became a destination of protesters of the Vietnam War in Heckscher Park (where the museum is sited) in the late 1960s and early '70s.

In 2006, the Heckscher proposed selling Eclipse of the Sun at its then-current appraisal of approximately $19,000,000.00 to pay for repairs and renovations to the building. There was such public outcry that the museum decided not to sell, and announced plans to create a dedicated space for display of the painting in the renovated museum.

== Legacy and estate ==
Grosz's art influenced other New Objectivity artists such as Heinrich Maria Davringhausen, Anton Räderscheidt, and Georg Scholz. In the United States, the artists influenced by his work included the social realists Ben Shahn and William Gropper. Ben Hecht, friendly with Grosz from his Berlin days, wrote in the Piece of My World catalog: "George Grosz has recorded the great phenomenon of our century – the collapse of human reason ... Alone, among modern painters, Grosz has recorded the spiritual descent into hell."

Grosz' art became popular in China, inspiring Chinese cartoonists such as Cai Ruohong and Lu Zhixiang with its criticism of German right-wing militarism. Grosz' pieces were widely reprinted in Chinese magazines, especially his 1922 artwork The White General.

In 1960, Grosz was the subject of the Oscar-nominated short film George Grosz' Interregnum. He is fictionalized as "Fritz Falke" in Arthur R.G. Solmssen's novel A Princess in Berlin (1980). In 2002, actor Kevin McKidd portrayed Grosz in a supporting role as an eager artist seeking exposure in Max, regarding Adolf Hitler's youth.

The Grosz estate filed a lawsuit in 1995 against the Manhattan art dealer Serge Sabarsky, arguing that Sabarsky had deprived the estate of appropriate compensation for the sale of hundreds of Grosz works he had acquired. In the suit, filed in New York Supreme Court in Manhattan, the Grosz estate claims that Sabarsky secretly acquired 440 Grosz works for himself, primarily drawings and watercolors produced in Germany in the 1910s and 20s. The lawsuit was settled in summer in 2006.

In 2003 the Grosz family initiated a legal battle against the Museum of Modern Art in New York City, asking that three paintings be returned. According to documents, the paintings were sold to the Nazis after Grosz fled the country in 1933. The museum never settled the claim, arguing that a three-year statute of limitations in bringing such a claim had expired. It is well documented that the Nazis stole thousands of paintings during World War II and many heirs of German painters continue to fight museums in order to reclaim such works.

In 2015, Ralph Jentsch – the managing director of the Grosz estate since 1994 – co-founded a Berlin-based nonprofit organization dedicated to the artist. In 2022, the Little Grosz Museum (Kleines Grosz Museum) opened in Berlin's Schöneberg district. Housed in a mid-century former gas station that was converted to a living space in 2008, the museum was funded by private donors and also housed a café and shop. It closed in November 2024.

== Art market ==
The highest price attained by a painting by Grosz in the art market was £9,740,250 ($12,661,185) for Gefährliche Straße (Dangerous Street) (1918) sold at Christie's, on February 5, 2020.

== Quotes ==
- "My Drawings expressed my despair, hate and disillusionment, I drew drunkards; puking men; men with clenched fists cursing at the moon. ... I drew a man, face filled with fright, washing blood from his hands ... I drew lonely little men fleeing madly through empty streets. I drew a cross-section of tenement house: through one window could be seen a man attacking his wife; through another, two people making love; from a third hung a suicide with body covered by swarming flies. I drew soldiers without noses; war cripples with crustacean-like steel arms; two medical soldiers putting a violent infantryman into a strait-jacket made of a horse blanket ... I drew a skeleton dressed as a recruit being examined for military duty. I also wrote poetry." — George Grosz

== Gallery ==
Café, 1915, Hirshhorn Museum

Made in Germany (German: Den macht uns keiner nach), 1919, Museum of Modern Art

Republican Automatons, 1920, Museum of Modern Art

Eclipse of the Sun, 1926, Heckscher Museum of Art

== See also ==
- Jedermann sein eigner Fussball, an artists' book by George Grosz and John Heartfield
- Assoziation revolutionärer bildender Künstler, an association of German artists
- List of German painters

== Bibliography ==
- Bergius, Hanne. Das Lachen Dadas. Die Berliner Dadaisten und ihre Aktionen. Gießen: Anabas-Verlag, 1989. ISBN 978-3-8703-8141-7
- Bergius, H. Montage und Metamechanik. Dada Berlin – Ästhetik von Polaritäten (mit Rekonstruktion der Ersten Internationalen Dada-Messe und Dada-Chronologie), Berlin: Gebr. Mann Verlag, 2000. ISBN 978-3-786115-25-0
- Bergius, H. Dada Triumphs! Dada Berlin, 1917–1923. Artistry of Polarities. Montages – Metamechanics – Manifestations. Translated by Brigitte Pichon. Vol. V of the ten editions of Crisis and the Arts. The History of Dada, ed. by Stephen Foster, New Haven, Conn. u. a., Thomson/ Gale, 2003. ISBN 978-0-816173-55-6
- Grosz, George (1946). A Little Yes and a Big No. New York: The Dial Press.
- Kranzfelder, Ivo (2005). George Grosz. Cologne: Taschen. ISBN 3-8228-0891-1
- Michalski, Sergiusz (1994). New Objectivity. Cologne: Taschen. ISBN 3-8228-9650-0
- Sabarsky, Serge, editor (1985). George Grosz: The Berlin Years. New York: Rizzoli. ISBN 0-8478-0668-5
- Schmied, Wieland (1978). Neue Sachlichkeit and German Realism of the Twenties. London: Arts Council of Great Britain. ISBN 0-7287-0184-7
- Vogel, Carol (October 7, 2006). "Peter M. Grosz, 80, Authority on Early German Aircraft, Dies" (obituary, Grosz's son), The New York Times
- Walker, B., Zieve, K., & Brooklyn Museum (1988). Prints of the German expressionists and their circle: Collection of the Brooklyn Museum. New York: Brooklyn Museum. ISBN 0872731154
