= August Thalheimer =

German activist

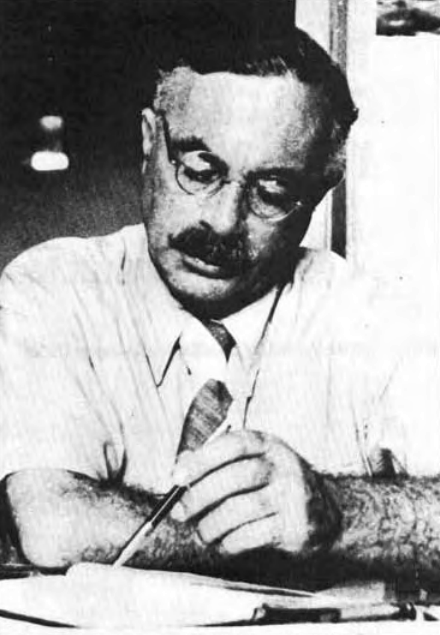
- Thalheimer in Havana, Cuba c. 1940s
- Born: 18 March 1884; Affaltrach, Kingdom of Württemberg, German Empire
- Died: 19 September 1948 (aged 64); Havana, Cuba
- Political party: SPD (1904–1917); USPD (1917–1919); KPD (1919–1929); KPD(O) (after 1929)
- Other political affiliations: Spartacus League (1914–1918)
- Relatives: Bertha Thalheimer (sister)
- Military career
- Allegiance: German Empire
- Branch: Imperial German Army
- Service years: 1916–1918
- Conflicts: World War I (WIA)
- Central institution membership: 1920–1924: Full member, KPD Politburo; 1919–1924: Full member, KPD Zentrale

August Thalheimer (18 March 1884 – 19 September 1948) was a German Marxist activist and theorist.

== Early life ==
He was born in 1884 in Affaltrach, now called Obersulm, Württemberg, Germany in to a Jewish working-class family. His sister was Bertha Thalheimer. He studied at the universities of Munich, Oxford, London, Strasbourg and Berlin.

== Political career ==
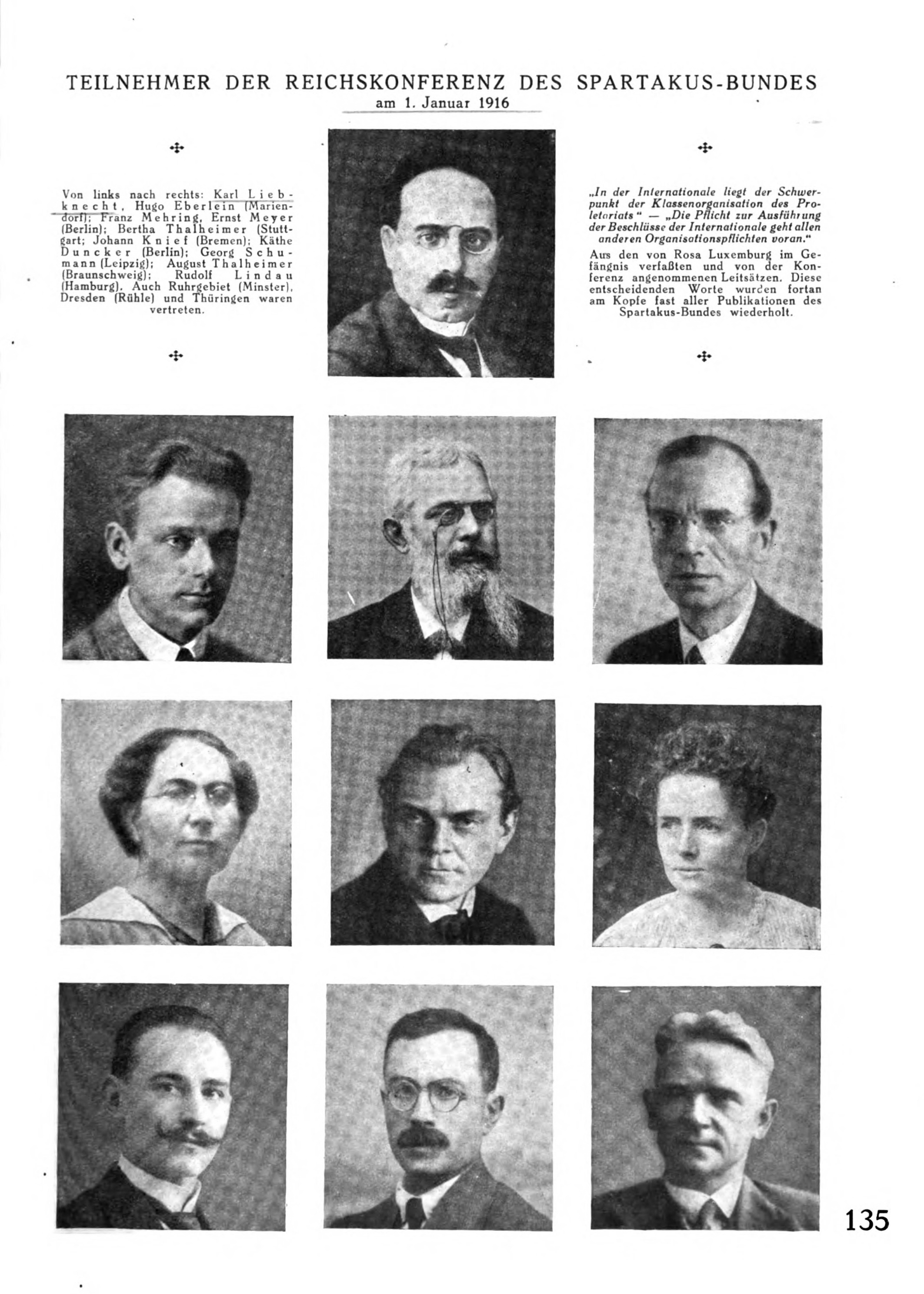
Thalheimer (bottom row, center) among participants of the Reich Conference of the Spartacus League, 1 January 1916

Thalheimer was a member of the Social Democratic Party of Germany (SPD) prior to the First World War. He edited Volksfreund, one of the party newspapers, and from 1916 he worked on Spartakusbriefe, the official paper of the Independent Social Democratic Party of Germany (USPD). After the 1916 Berlin strike, he was drafted into the Imperial German Army and sent to the front, where he was wounded. He was arrested shortly before the end of the war in 1918 but was freed by the German Revolution. Thalheimer became a founding member of the Communist Party of Germany (KPD) and was recognised as its main theorist in the early 1920s. He edited Rote Fahne and the manuscripts that Franz Mehring left unpublished at his death.

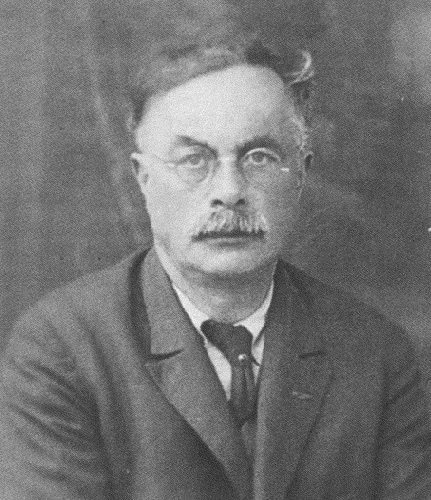
Thalheimer in November 1923

Thalheimer was part of the local government in Württemberg serving as Minister of Finance during the crisis of 1923. He and Heinrich Brandler were blamed for the consequences and summoned to Moscow in 1924. There, he worked for the Comintern and the Marx-Engels Institute. In 1927, Thalheimer gave a series of lectures at the Moscow Sun Yat-sen University that were then published as a textbook in philosophy (the English translation appeared as Introduction to Dialectical Materialism, New York, 1936). He also worked with Nikolai Bukharin on the draft programme of the Comintern. Unease with the leadership of Ernst Thälmann made him return to the KPD in Germany in 1928. However, a year later, he and Brandler were expelled from the KPD and they went on to form the Communist Party Opposition (KPO).

The KPO criticised the foreign policy of the Soviet Union but not its domestic policies. Thalheimer stated: "We do not want to draw the conclusion that as the politics of the Comintern are wrong, it must follow that the politics of Russia are also wrong". (Gegen den Strom, 4/1931) Thalheimer supported both forced 'collectivization' and Stakhanovism.

Thalheimer went into exile in Paris from 1932.

Beginning at the start of 1935 Thalheimer began writing a regular column on international news for Workers Age, the official newspaper of the Communist Party of the USA (Opposition), headed by Jay Lovestone.

Thalheimer went to Barcelona, Spain, in 1936. Here he became involved in an argument with Andrés Nin over the Workers' Party of Marxist Unification's (POUM) condemnation of the first Moscow Trial. He soon returned to France again to work with the KPO in exile. In July 1937, when six members of the KPO in Barcelona were arrested by the Stalinists, he issued a joint statement with Brandler:

"We take upon ourselves any political and personal guarantee for our arrested comrades. They are anti-Fascists and revolutionaries, incapable of any action that could be construed as high treason to the Spanish Revolution."

== Later life ==
In 1940, after the German conquest of France, Thalheimer fled to Cuba. He died in Havana in 1948.

== Works ==
- "1923: A Missed Opportunity? The German October Legend and the Real History of 1923." (1931) Mike Jones, trans. London: Marken Press, 1993.
- “On Fascism”. Telos 40 (Summer 1979). New York: Telos Press.

== Sources ==
- Theodor Bergmann: August Thalheimer - ein kommunistischer Ketzer. Zu seinem 60. Todestag, in: Jahrbuch für Forschungen zur Geschichte der Arbeiterbewegung, No. III/2008.
