= Heckscher Museum of Art =

American art museum

Coordinates: 40°52′29.5″N 73°25′18.5″W

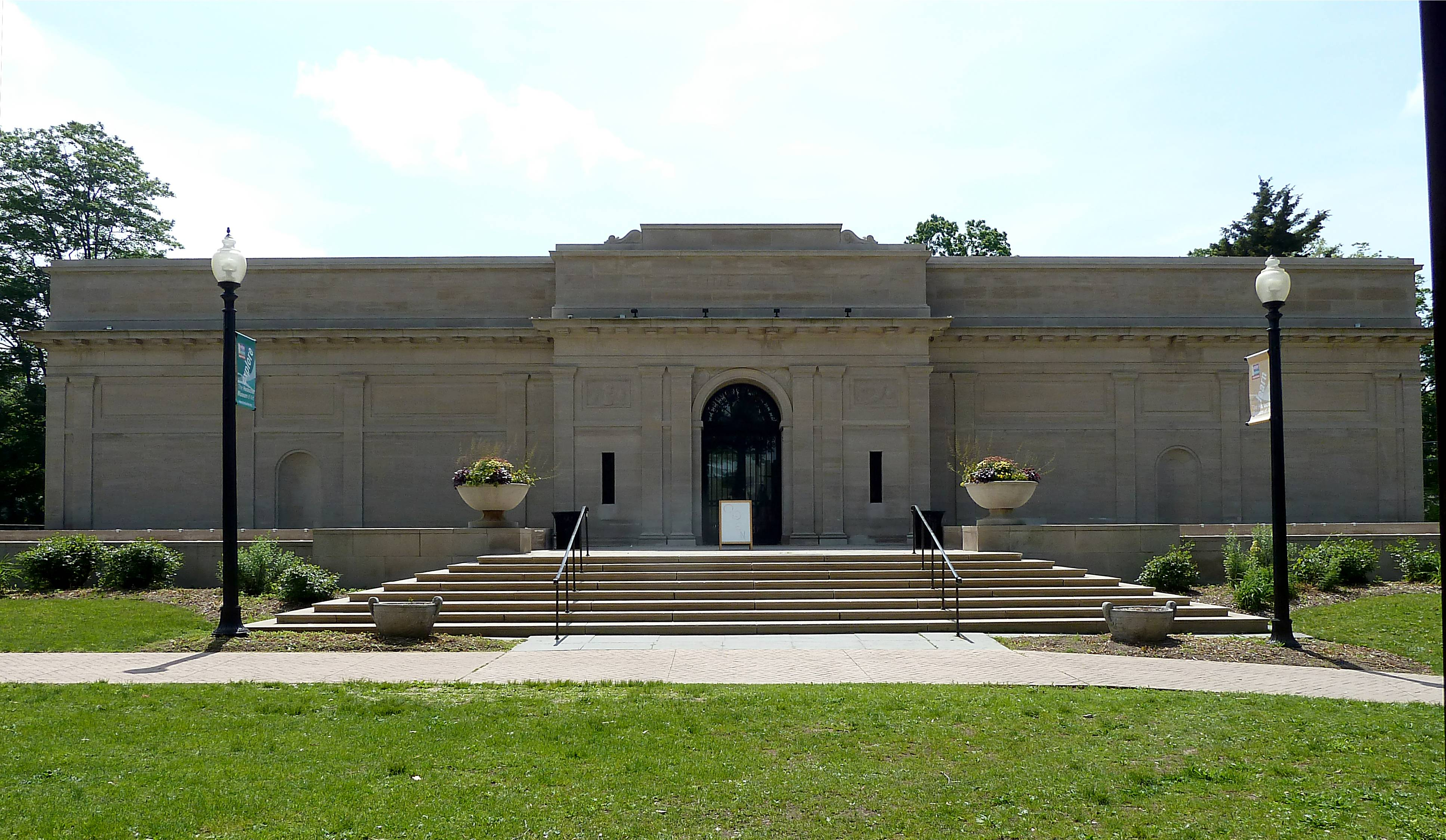
- Main entrance and front facade
- Established: 1920 (106 years ago)
- Location: 2 Prime Avenue, Huntington, New York, U.S.
- Type: Art museum
- Directors: Heather Arnet, Executive Director and CEO
- Curators: Karli Wurzelbacher, Ph.D., Chief Curator
- Website: heckscher.org

The Heckscher Museum of Art is an American art museum.

It is named after its benefactors, Anna and August Heckscher, who in 1920 donated 185 works of art to be housed in a new Beaux-Arts building located in Heckscher Park, in Huntington, New York. The museum has over 2,300 works of art, focused on American and Long Island artists, as well as featuring American and European modernism, and photography. The most famous painting in the collection is George Grosz's Eclipse of the Sun (1926). Four to five changing exhibitions are featured each year.

== History ==
Founded by Anna and August Heckscher in 1920, the museum was based on his initial donation of 185 works of art. The building was designed by Julius Franke of the New York architecture firm of Maynicke & Franke.

In 1957, the Town of Huntington passed responsibility for running the museum to an independent board of trustees, after which the museum began once again to expand its collection. The collection was greatly enlarged in 2001 with the donation of a large collection of American paintings and drawings by Ronald G. Pisano and D. Frederick Baker, one of the largest gifts to the museum since August Heckscher's original donation.

== Collection ==
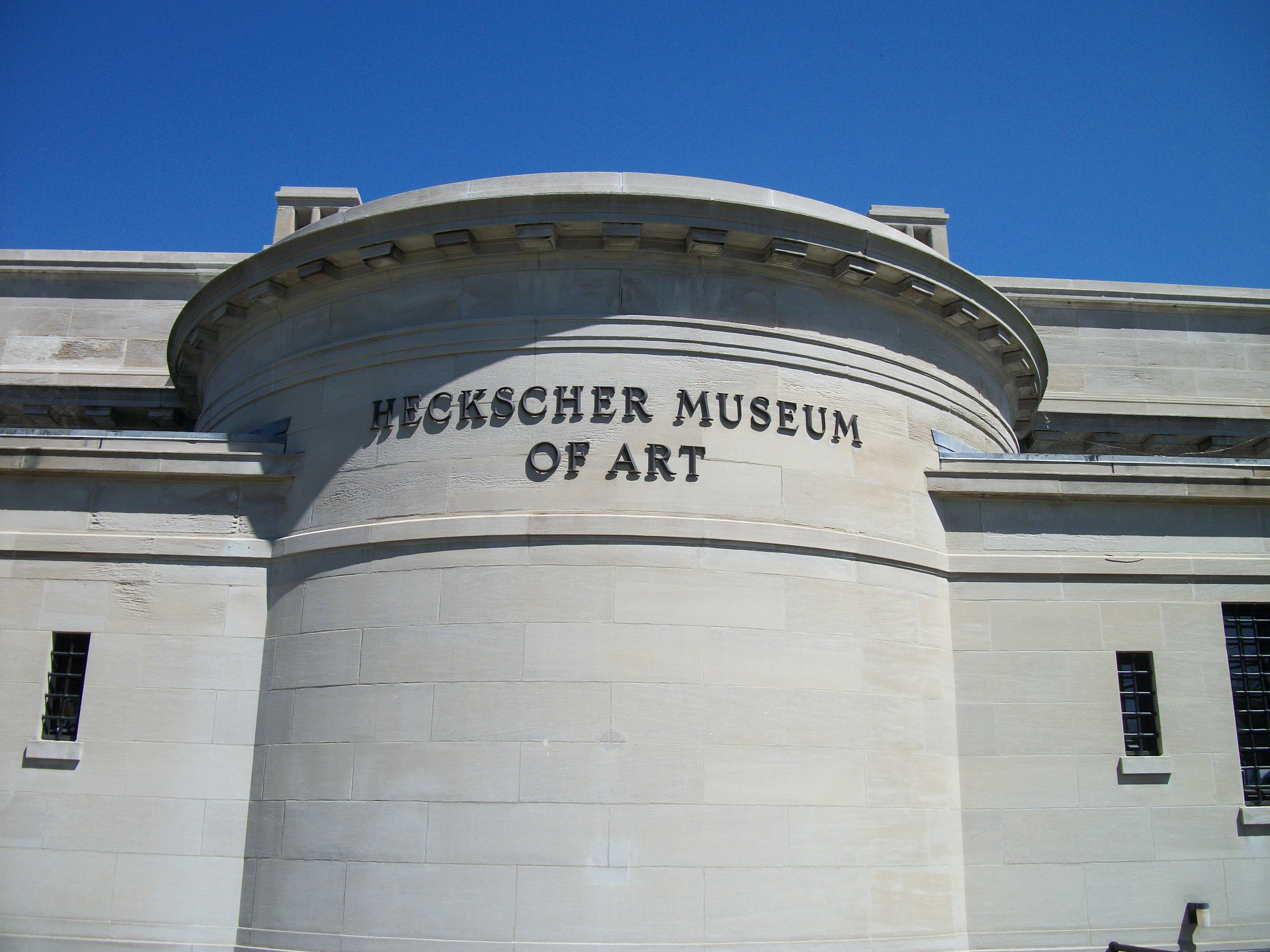
Detail of rear facade

The collection has grown from its original 185 works to over 2,300, and spans over 500 years. The oldest major work is Lucas Cranach the Elder's Virgin, Child, St. John the Baptist and Angels of 1534.

The museum has works by 17th-, 18th- and 19th-century European painters, but is strongest in 19th-, 20th- and 21st-century American artists. The entire collection can be viewed online.

The modern and abstract art collections are extensive and includes artists such as Ilya Bolotowsky, Georgia O'Keeffe, Knox Martin, and Esphyr Slobodkina. The museum also features many works from one-time Huntington residents such as Arthur Dove, Helen Torr, and George Grosz.

The photography collection features the work of Berenice Abbott, Larry Fink, Eadweard Muybridge, and Man Ray's Electricité portfolio of 1931.

The museum is open year round from Thursday through Sunday.
