= Kriege =

Kriege is a surname. Notable people with the surname include:

- Hermann Kriege (1820–1850), German-American journalist and revolutionary
- Jan Kriege (1884–1944), Dutch sculptor
- Johannes Kriege (1859–1937), German jurist and politician
- Walter Kriege (1891–1952), German jurist

== See also ==
- Krieger (surname)
- Krieg (surname)
