= Krieg (surname) =

Krieg is a surname, and may refer to:

- Angie Wester-Krieg (born 1964), American swimmer
- Bill Krieg (1859–1930), American baseball player
- Carolyn Krieg (born 1953), American artist
- Christine Krieg, Swiss curler
- Dave Krieg (born 1958), American football quarterback
- Jim Krieg (1949–2018), American football player
- Lenny Krieg (born 2002), German football player
- Lothar Krieg (born 1955), German sprinter
- Nathalie Krieg (born 1977), Swiss figure skater
- Otto Krieg, Swiss footballer
- Peter Krieg (1947–2009), German filmmaker
- Pierre-Charles Krieg (1922–1998), French lawyer and politician
- Rainer Krieg (born 1968), German footballer and coach
- Robert A. Krieg (born 1946), American theologian
- Susan Krieg (born 1952), American artist

== See also ==
- Kriege
