= Nursing in the United Kingdom =

Nursing in the United Kingdom is the profession of registered nurses and nursing associates in the primary and secondary care of patients. It has evolved from assisting doctors to encompass a variety of professional roles. More than 780,000 registered nurses practise in the UK, working in settings such as hospitals, health centres, nursing homes, hospices, communities, military, prisons, and academia. Many are employed by the National Health Service (NHS).

Nursing is split into four fields: adults, children, mental health, and learning disability. Within these nurses may work within specialties such as medical care or theatres, and may specialise further in areas such as cardiac care. Nurses often work in multi-disciplinary teams, but equally work independently, and may work in supporting sectors such as education or research.

The UK-wide regulator for nursing is the Nursing and Midwifery Council (NMC), and all nurses and nursing associates must be registered to practise. Dental Nurses, nursery nurses and veterinary nurses are not regulated by the NMC and follow different training, qualifications and career pathways.

== History ==
The history of nursing in the United Kingdom describes the development of nursing from an unregulated and low-paid occupation into a regulated, graduate profession. Developing from a tradition of monastic infirmaries, nursing as a profession was popularised most in the 19th century by Florence Nightingale, who alongside others sought to introduce a formally trained caring profession to complement medicine. The establishment of the Nightingale Training School at St Thomas’ Hospital in 1860 marked the beginning of organised nursing education in the UK and preceded similar developments across the country. The profession matured throughout the 20th century, with state registration introduced by the Nurses Registration Act 1919 and a royal college established in 1928. The establishment of the National Health Service in 1948 resulted most of hospital nursing moving into the public sector and more standardised approaches to care. Since then there has been a shift towards nursing being a graduate profession; all UK pre-registration nursing programmes being at undergraduate degree level from 2013 with an emphasis on evidence-based practice.

== Registration and regulation ==
There are two levels of nursing registration in the UK: registered nurses and nursing associates. To practise lawfully as a registered nurse or nursing associate, the practitioner must hold a current and valid registration with the Nursing and Midwifery Council (NMC).

The NMC exists to establish and improve standards of nursing and midwifery care to protect the public. It achieves this by placing registered nurses and nursing associates on a state register, which anyone can search. The powers of the NMC are set out in the Nursing and Midwifery Order 2001. The NMC's Council is appointed by the Privy Council.

=== Register ===
The NMC register is split into four main parts: nurses, midwives, specialist community public health nurses (SCPHN) and nursing associates. Nurse-midwife dual registration is sometimes held . The NMC sets out which qualifications it recognises and maintains a list of approved courses. Revalidation is a requirement for all NMC registered members, who revalidate every three years in order to ensure their registration can be renewed. Criteria to meet revalidation include having completed 450 hours of practice in the previous three years. Revalidation was introduced in April 2016.

=== Code of conduct ===
The Code: Professional standards of practice and behaviour for nurses, midwives and nursing associates, generally referred to as the NMC Code, was revised in 2018 to reflect the regulation of nursing associates. The NMC Code presents the professional standards that must be upheld in order to be registered to practise in the UK.

'Nurse' title

The title "registered nurse" can only be granted to those holding such registration; this protected title is laid down in the Nurses, Midwives and Health Visitors Act 1979. Until recently the title "nurse" was not legally protected, so anybody could call themselves a nurse. In response to a campaign led by Alison Leary and Paul Trevatt, the Brent East MP Dawn Butler successfully introduced a bill in Parliament in February 2025 to protect the title of 'nurse'. It was agreed it would be introduced via minor changes to the Nursing and Midwifery Order 2001.

== Nursing roles and education ==
All nursing roles require continuing professional development throughout someone's career. All nursing courses deliver learning split between study (lectures, essays, projects and examinations) and clinical practice (supervised patient care within a hospital or community setting). There is a strong tradition in UK nursing of combining academic and clinical professional development.

=== Registered nurses ===
Nurses in the UK qualify and work in one of the four fields of nursing - adult, children, mental health and learning disability. From 2011 students studying a pre-registration nursing programmes in Scotland were required to complete an undergraduate degree. From September 2013 all UK pre-registration nursing programmes are at degree level.

People apply to either an adult, children, mental health or learning disability nursing undergraduate course via university. An undergraduate nursing degree usually takes three years full-time, the NMC requires each student must log over 4,600 combined hours of study and clinical work.

After qualification, professional development areas such as cannulation, intravenous drug therapy, and male catheterisation is common. To become specialist nurses (such as nurse consultants, nurse practitioners, etc.) or nurse educators, some nurses undertake further training above bachelor's degree level. Master's degrees exist in various healthcare related topics, and some nurses choose to study for PhDs or other higher academic awards. District nurses and health visitors are also considered specialist nurses, and to become such they must undertake specialist training (often in the form of a top-up degree (see above) or post graduate diploma).

=== Nursing associates and support workers ===
The NMC Register for Nursing Associates opened in January 2019, for England only. Nursing Associates work across the four fields of nursing in many care settings, bridging the gap between nursing support workers and registered nurses. To become a Nursing Associate people apply for an NMC-approved university foundation degree level course, through the Nursing Associate Apprenticeship programme.

Nursing support workers are also known as healthcare assistants, clinical support workers, care assistants, or nursing assistants. The role is found across all nursing settings, and is a key part of the nursing team. Registration with the NMC is not required and the role is not regulated, with no specific education necessary. However care providers are legally accountable, so Nursing Support Workers must be trained and supervised - usually by a registered nurse.

=== Overseas nurses ===
The Nursing and Midwifery Council has a specific process for inducting Registered Nurses trained outside the UK. Prior to October 2016 an outside UK RN would have to undergo an Overseas Nursing Program known in short as the ONP. The ONP had to be undertaken by the candidate after NMC makes necessary checks and issue the candidate with a decision letter stating that the person may join a university to undertake the ONP.

However, owing to a shortage of nurses and increasing standards in nursing a new process was introduced to include two part test of competence, including an OSCE (Objective Structured Clinical Examination). The process includes an English language test, the standards of which have been criticised for being too high.

== Nursing organisations and trade unions ==
As of 2026, more than 100 organisations are related to nursing as regulated by the Nursing and Midwifery Council, not including nursing departments in universities or in the NHS. These include professional bodies, nursing specialties, charities, and migrant support networks.The largest of the professional bodies is the Royal College of Nursing (RCN) with over 500,000 members.

Four trade unions represent nurses: the Royal College of Nursing (RCN), Unite the Union, UNISON and GMB. The RCN has a dual role as both a professional body and a trade union.

== Workforce ==
=== Demographics ===
The Nursing and Midwifery Council report on registration data twice a year (April and September).

The majority of the nursing profession are women at around 90% of the total workforce. In September 2025, there were 793,694 registered nurses, 47,481 registered midwives, 6,193 dual registrants, and 13,433 nursing associates. The average age of registrants was 44 years, 1 month. 24.4% of registrants were internationally educated, but 2025 saw a slowing down of new international joiners to the register, and an increase in the number of international leavers.

As at September 2025 632,082 of registrants were Adult Nurses; 62,556 were Children's Nurses; 105,103 were Mental Health Nurses; and 16,796 were Learning Disability Nurses This further decrease in Learning Disability Nurses led the NMC to state "This is a particular concern given research findings that adults with a learning disability in England are nearly twice as likely as the general population to suffer an avoidable death."

=== Workforce planning ===
In England, Health Education England commission undergraduate and postgraduate education. This is an autonomous national body which works to "ensure that healthcare staff are recruited in the right numbers with the right values and behaviours to support the delivery of excellent healthcare and drive improvement". The number of commissioned places for nurses has varied year on year, as follows:

Adult nursing education places commissioned each year

2009/10	2010/11	2011/12	2012/13	2013/14	2014/15
14,451	13,628	11,930	11,416	12,134	

=== Nursing shortages ===
In January 2016 the RCN stated that more than 10,000 nursing posts went unfilled in 2015. This represented a 3% increase year on year from 11% in 2013, 14% in 2014 and 17% in 2015 of all London nursing positions and 10% as an average nationwide. The Department of Health said it did not recognise the figures. The National Audit Office estimated a shortfall of 7% in the supply of nurses. From 2016/17 registered nursing numbers fell 3% along with a 23% rise in de-registrations. 17,000 nurse permanently unfilled vacancies were observed. In 2019, clinical pharmacology, spinal injuries, paediatric surgery, neurosurgery and neurology were the worst-affected specialities. They had an average of less than 90% of their planned nurse staffing levels.

School nurses were also in short supply.

Hospitals in England are required to report the number of nurses employed on each ward each month. After this was established, ward nurses increased by 13,500, although the numbers of community nurses declined.

=== Migration ===
A 2015 Organisation for Economic Co-operation and Development survey reported that 21.7% of NHS nurses were born abroad, compared with 26.9% in Ireland, 9.8% in Italy, 14% in Germany and 5.9% in France. The UK was also the highest exporter of nurses, with more than 50,000 working in other OECD nations. The Migration Advisory Committee criticised the Department of Health, Health Education England, and NHS trusts for not recognising obvious warning signs and "reluctantly" agreed to keep nursing on the list of shortage occupations.

An English language test is compulsory for all foreign nurses, even if they are from English-speaking countries. The process of registering as a nurse can take migrants up to a year and cost more than £3,000.

== Nurse health ==
Obesity and smoking have long been an issue in nurse health. The effect of nursing on nurses' physical and mental health has been a subject of research papers where the effect of shift work and working with chemicals such as in chemotherapy has been explored. In 2016, the government announced £600 million was to be spent on "tackling obesity and improving the well-being of its 1.3 million staff".

== Pay and conditions ==
=== Agenda for Change ===
Agenda for Change (AfC) is the 'NHS Terms and Conditions of Service' including pay. As the NHS is the largest single employer of nurses in the UK this influences pay rates across the sector. Registered/newly qualified nurses begin their careers as a Band 5 . Pay is set out in nine pay bands, each band has a number of pay points. Staff usually progress to the next pay band after the required number of years until they reach the top of the pay band. In addition to basic pay, there is also extra pay for staff who work in high cost areas such as around London.

By 2025, devolution of health policy and of the NHS to each of the countries of the United Kingdom led to significant differences in pay for the same band. In 2025–26, the starting salary for a Band 5 registered nurse was £33,247 in Scotland £31,516 for Wales, £31,048 in England, and £29,970 in Northern Ireland.

Northern Ireland repeatedly faces issues with delayed public sector pay awards which the unions have campaigned against. The Northern Ireland Executive has faced several power-sharing impasses where no decisions were made by the government due to a boycott from one of the political parties, most recently in 2025.

Progression across bands was significantly slower for nurses than for other health professionals. A nine-year study by the Institute for Fiscal Studies for 2012-2021 showed over one-third (35%) of nurses were still in Band 5. A Royal College of Nursing report in 2025 showed "44% of the nursing workforce in the NHS in England are working at band 5. This rises to 46% in Wales, 50% in Northern Ireland and 54% in Scotland. By comparison, only 13% of midwives and 25% of paramedics are paid at band 5, despite starting their careers at the same pay band as registered nurses." It was asserted these barriers to career progression have a negative impact on recruitment and retention of nurses in the United Kingdom.

=== NHS Pay Review Body (NHSPRB) ===
The NHS Pay Review Body (NHSPRB) is an independent body that makes recommendations to the government on the pay of nurses and NHS staff. The government then makes the final decision.

=== Pay awards and disputes ===
The United Kingdom government austerity programme (2010–2019) pursued by the Conservative Party (UK) sought to reduce public spending and tax rises. The impact of COVID and a change of government led the Labour Party (UK) to continue awarding modest pay increases. Overall the pay awards in this period did not keep pace with inflation - resulting in pay cut a real terms. In 2015, the RCN stated that Nurses had suffered a drop in pay equivalent to 9.8% in real terms since 2008, in 2025 they stated it was a drop for an experienced nurse of 25%.

According to a Health Foundation report in 2021 "NHS nurses’ basic earnings grew by 13% in nominal terms between March 2011 and March 2021. However, after accounting for consumer price inflation, this amounts to a 5% reduction in real terms." whilst a Royal College of Nursing 2025 report placed the reduction for Band five nurses between 2010 and 2025 at up to 21%

This resulted in a number of pay campaigns and disputes by the unions including the first ever strike action by the Royal College of Nursing in Northern Ireland in 2019. The reasons for the strikes were not simply about pay, but about the ability of nurses to provide 'safe and effective care' with inadequate staffing levels. A study published in BMJ Open in 2017 linked austerity to 120,000 extra deaths in England, primarily as a result of a reduction in the number of nurses.

Sexism has been raised as an issue around pay, with complaints in 2016 that Agenda for Change is a sexist system under-valuing nurses. A 2019 report showed a lack of progression for women within the profession with men being over-represented in the senior positions At the Royal College of Nursing Congress in May 2025, their General Secretary Nicola Ranger asserted that 'the nursing profession is undervalued and underpaid due to being a predominantly female field'.

== Legislation ==
Government legislation governing nursing in the United Kingdom, much of which is still in force as at 2026, including:

- Health and Care (Staffing) (Scotland) Act 2019
- Nurse Staffing Levels (Wales) Act 2016
- Nursing and Midwifery Order 2001
- Nurses, Midwives and Health Visitors Act 1997 (repealed)
- Nurses, Midwives and Health Visitors Act 1992 (repealed 19 June 1997)
- Medicinal Products: Prescription by Nurses etc. Act 1992
- Nurses, Midwives and Health Visitors Act 1979
- Nursing Homes Act 1975
- Nurses Act 1949, this reconstituted the General Nursing Council for England and Wales and amended the previous Nursing Acts, to improve nurse training. The reconstitution included abolishing the supplementary register so that male general nurses joined the general register alongside their female colleagues.
- Nurses Act 1943
- Royal National Pension Fund for Nurses Act 1936
- Nurses Registration Act 1919

== Government reports ==
Significant government publications on nursing and midwifery include:

- Front Line Care (Report) into nursing and midwifery was published in 2010. The chair of the commission was Ann Keen MP who trained as a nurse. The government response, led by Anne Milton, was published in April 2011.
- Cumberlege Report 1986 or Neighbourhood nursing: a focus for care was the report of a Department of Health and Social Security (DHSS) committee recommending that community nurses be permitted to prescribe from a restricted list of treatments.
- The Clegg Report or Standing Commission on Pay Comparability established in 1979 to review public pay in response to the Winter of Discontent published in 1980 resulting in a 22% pay rise for nurses
- Report of the Committee of Enquiry into Mental Handicap Nursing and Care published in 1979. The Committee of Enquiry was chaired by Peggy Jay.
- The Halsbury Report published in 1974 by the Halsbury Committee of Inquiry into the Pay and Related Conditions of Service of Nurses and Midwives which recommended an average 33% pay rise.
- Briggs Report of the Committee on Nursing in the United Kingdom, 1972 which reviewed the role of nurses and midwives in hospitals and in community care. It made recommendations on education, training, and professional regulation. The report was accepted in 1974.
- Mayston Report on Management Structure in the Local Authority Nursing Services 1969
- Salmon Report on Senior Nursing Staff Structure 1966
- Ministry of Health, Department of Health for Scotland, and Ministry of Labour and National Service (Wood Committee) 1947 Report of the Working Party on the Recruitment and Training of Nurses - a government report on the recruitment and training of nurse
- Nurses Salaries Committee or Rushcliffe Report was established in October 1941 and published two reports in 1943. was the first official body to fix salary scales and conditions for nursing in England.
- Athlone Report Ministry of Health and Board of Education Interim Report of the Interdepartmental Committee on Nursing Services – nursing recruitment, retention and skills 1939

== Significant nursing reports ==
Significant reports from the Royal College of Nursing include:

- Wills Commission on the Future of Nursing Education 2012 Quality with Compassion: the future of nursing education led by Phil Willis
- Judge Report of a Commission on Nursing Education 1985
- The State of Nursing 1974 submission to the Secretary of State for Social Services which led to the Halsbury Report
- Platt Report 1964 on the Reform of Nursing Education
- Horder Committee (Nursing Reconstruction Committee) 1941–1949 to consider the recommendations of the government's Athlone Report It published four reports.

Additional reports relating to nursing in the UK include:

- UKCC for Nursing Midwifery and Health Visiting. The Report of the Post-Registration Education and Practice Project. 1990
- Lancet Commission on Nursing (1932) – looked at the reasons for the shortages of applicants to nursing

== See also ==
- Nursing education in the United Kingdom
- Category:Nursing education in the United Kingdom
- History of nursing in the United Kingdom
- List of nursing organisations in the United Kingdom
- Category:Nursing organisations in the United Kingdom
- List of nursing journals (sortable by country)
- List of nurses
- List of fictional nurses
- Category:British nurses
- Category:Members of the Royal Red Cross
- Category:Florence Nightingale Medal recipients
- Category:British military nurses
