= Mary Saran =

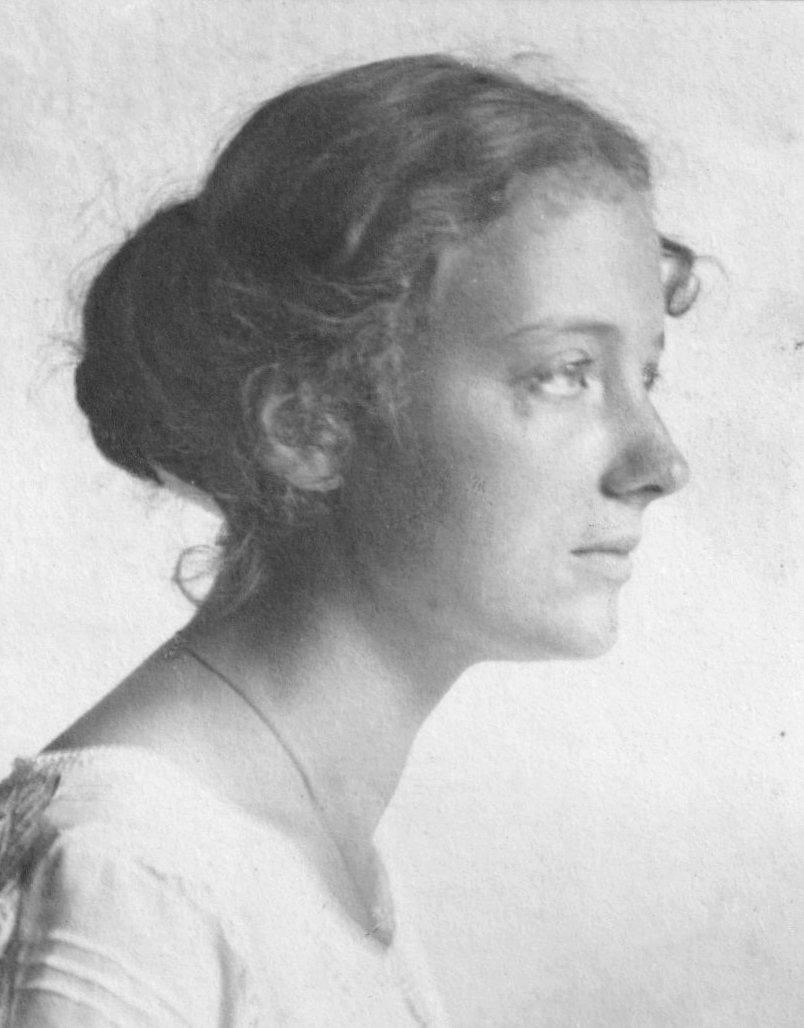
- Saran in 1916
- Born: Maria Martha Saran; 13 July 1897; Cranz, East Prussia, Germany
- Died: 16 February 1976 (aged 78); London, England
- Other names: M. Jensen; Maria Hodann; Mary Flanders
- Occupations: Political activist; Author; Journalist
- Spouse(s): Max Hodann; Allan Flanders
- Parent: Richard Saran

Maria Martha Saran (13 July 1897 – 16 February 1976), known as Mary Saran, was a journalist and author. In 1933 she emigrated from her native Germany to England, where she took British nationality and where she lived for the rest of her life.

Mary Saran also wrote under the pseudonym M. Jensen. In addition, she was twice, albeit on the second occasion only briefly, married, and she therefore may appear in sources as Maria Hodann or Mary Flanders.

== Life ==
=== Provenance and early years ===
Maria Saran was born in Cranz, a small seaside town in what was then East Prussia. She was the seventh of ten recorded children born to the busy architect Richard Saran and his wife. On her mother's side Maria was a niece of the diplomat Johannes Kriege, and thereby a first cousin of the lawyer Walter Kriege and a remoter kinswoman of the early socialist Hermann Kriege. Much of her father's architectural work was undertaken as a result of his employment as a "Regierungs- und Baurat", a government appointment. The family lived a short distance to the west of Königsberg while his children were young, but in 1901 they relocated to Wiesbaden in connection with Richard Saran's work. They moved again, this time to Berlin, in 1906.

She embarked on a course in Medicine, studying at Berlin and Göttingen in 1918, and successfully completing the first stage (Physikum) of the course before abandoning it. She married a young doctor called Max Hodann on 24 December 1919, which was the day on which Hodann received his doctorate for a dissertation advocating counseling centres for sufferers from Venereal diseases, entitled "Die sozialhygienische Bedeutung der Beratungsstellen für Geschlechtskranke". The marriage would end in divorce on 13 July 1926, by which time the couple's daughter, Renate, had been born, and left-wing politics had replaced medicine as the other focus of Maria's life.

=== Politics ===
As war gave way to searing austerity and a year of revolutions, Maria and Max Hodann became increasingly involved with the International Association for Socialist Struggle ("Internationaler Sozialistischer Kampfbund" / ISK ), which had been set up in 1918 by the charismatic Göttingen-based philosopher Leonard Nelson. She also worked in adult education in Berlin and engaged in social work. She had also, in 1918, joined the Independent Social Democratic Party ("Unabhängige Sozialdemokratische Partei Deutschlands" / USPD), which had been formed the previous year when the Social Democratic Party ("Sozialdemokratische Partei Deutschlands" / SPD) had split, largely over the issue of whether or not to continue backing German participation in the war. During the early 1920s the USPD in its turn splintered, and Maria Hodann was one of many former "defectors" who was back in the SPD by the middle of the decade, while at the same time actively sustaining her work with the more cerebral and, many would have said, more uncompromisingly left-wing ISK. She was one of those who signed the ISK's Urgent Call for [political left-wing] Unity (against the imminent Nazi takeover in Germany) in 1932.

During the early months of 1933, the Hitler government lost little time in creating a post-democratic German state. Emergency powers opened the way for attacks against, and mass arrests of, high-profile left-wing activists, Jews, and others identified by government as enemies. Maria Saran escaped with her twelve-year-old daughter Renate (Rene), initially to France and, for some months, Denmark. By the end of 1933 they had arrived as refugees in England, living in a "communal household" with fellow socialists.

In Britain she worked with in the Socialist Vanguard Group (SVG), which was effectively the British branch of the ISK. In 1941 she became editor of the group's monthly publication, retaining the editorship (latterly jointly with Rita Hinden) until 1955. During the 1930s she had obtained British citizenship, in 1935/36 briefly marrying a fellow socialist, Allan Flanders, in support of her citizenship application. War ended in defeat for the Nazi régime in May 1945. Many of the socialist refugees from Nazism, who had lived in England since the 1930s now returned to Germany, including Minna Specht with whom Saran had at times worked closely in London. Mary Saran stayed on in England, working as a freelance journalist, contributing particularly (but not exclusively) to socialist and women's publications. Till 1947 she was the editor for "Europe speaks" in succession to Willi Eichler who had also returned to Germany. She also worked with the UNESCO, focusing on women's issues. She continued to play an active part in British Labour Party politics and in adult education. From 1974 she taught in a London school. Her memoir appeared in 1976 under the title "Never give up". 1976 was also the year in which she died. Her English language memoir was translated by her friend, the historian Susanne Miller, and published privately in Germany under the title "Gib niemals auf. Erinnerungen" in 1979.

== Selected bibliography ==
- 1976 Never give up. Memoirs. Preface: W. Arthur Lewis. Oswald Wolff Ltd., London (German translation by Susanne Miller: Gib niemals auf. Erinnerungen. Privately printed, Bonn 1979)
- 1975 For Community Service. The Mount Carmel Experiment. Blackwell Publishers, ISBN 0-631-15630-5
- 1945 with Willi Eichler & Werner Hansen: Re-Making Germany. Foreword: James Griffiths. International Publishing Company, SVG, London
- 1942 The Future Europe. Peace or Power Politics? London
- 1941 European Revolution: How to Win the Peace. London

== See also ==
- Philosophisch-Politische Akademie
- Socialist Vanguard Group
