= Alan Fox (sociologist) =

English industrial sociologist (1920–2002)

Alan Fox DFM (23 January 1920 – 26 June 2002) was an English industrial sociologist, who revolutionised the separate discipline of industrial relations.

== Biography ==
Fox was born on 23 January 1920, to machine enameller and World War I veteran Walter Henry, and Rhoda Fox (née Rous), and grew up in Manor Park, London. He failed his eleven plus examination and — like most British working class children of his generation — left school at the age of 14. He worked first as a laboratory assistant at a grammar school and then in a photographic film factory.

When the Second World War broke out, Fox joined the Royal Air Force (RAF) and applied for aircrew training, but was rejected due to poor eyesight. He served initially as a ground staff photographer in India and Burma, with the rank of Corporal. He volunteered for service as an aerial photographer with No. 3 Photographic Reconnaissance Unit, which undertook hazardous missions over Japanese-held areas, using North American Mitchell aircraft. Fox, who was promoted to Sergeant, received the Distinguished Flying Medal (RAF). After the war, Fox worked for the Forestry Commission in Scotland.

In 1947 and 1948, he undertook a diploma in public administration at Ruskin College, an independent institution in Oxford. Fox then entered the University of Oxford, where he spent the majority of his academic career, studying economics and political science at Exeter College. In 1950, while lecturing at Ruskin, he completed a Bachelor of Letters (B.Litt.) thesis on the history of industrial relations in the Black Country. That same year, Fox married Margaret Dow, with whom he had two sons. In 1958, he became a research fellow at Nuffield College and in 1963, he became a lecturer at Nuffield, in the Department of Social and Administrative Studies.

Fox rose to prominence with a 1966 paper, Industrial Sociology And Industrial Relations, written for the Donovan Royal Commission on Trade Unions and Employers' Associations (1965–68). In it he described the dominance in industrial relations of two, rival ideological/theoretical perspectives. The first, for which Fox coined the name "unitary" (later unitarist), denies that the interests of employers and employees were significantly different from each other. For the other perspective, he used an existing term from political science: "pluralist", a perspective which suggests that multiple parties are involved in decision-making. However, Fox himself was strongly influenced by a third major theoretical position: the "radical" perspective, especially Marxism.

With Allan Flanders and Hugh Clegg, Fox became prominent in a group of scholars known collectively as the "Oxford school of industrial relations". Although the Oxford school was frequently associated with pluralism, during the 1970s Fox adopted an overtly radical position. In "Industrial relations: a social critique of pluralist ideology" (1973) and Beyond Contract (1974), he suggested that unitarism and pluralism, in practice, were often combined and/or difficult to distinguish.

== Major works ==
- Industrial Sociology And Industrial Relations (1966)
- "Industrial relations: a social critique of pluralist ideology" (1973), in Child, John, 1973 Man and Organization: The Search for Explanation and Social Relevance, Allen and Unwin, London.
- Beyond Contract (1974)
- History and Heritage: the Social Origins of the British Industrial Relations System (1985)
- A Very Late Development (1990; autobiography)
