= Allan Flanders =

British academic (1910–1973)

- Born: 27 July 1910; Watford, Hertfordshire
- Died: 29 September 1973 (aged 63); Edinburgh
- Occupations: Academic author
- Spouse(s): Mary Saran; Edith Moore; Annemarie Klara Laura Tracinski

Allan Flanders (27 July 1910 – 29 September 1973) was a British academic, author, and founding member of the Oxford School of Industrial Relations, along with Hugh Clegg, Alan Fox, Lord William McCarthy, Sir George Bain and Otto Kahn-Freund. The school was a developer of the idea of collective bargaining and overall proponents of bargaining power, legal contracts, normative regulation and institutionalized conflict resolutions as issues of significance and focus in the field of industrial relations.

== Biography ==
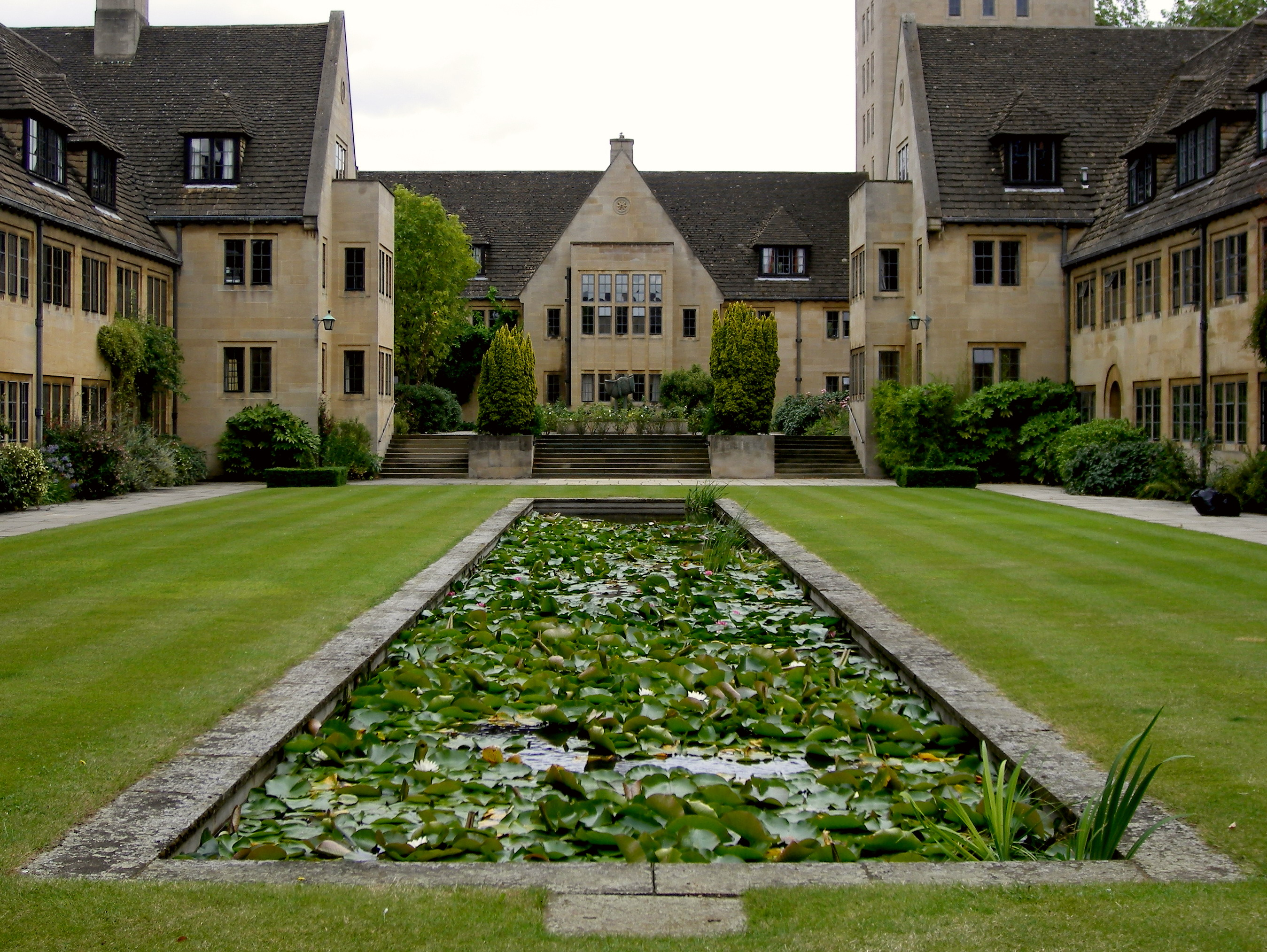
Nuffield College lower quadrangle

Flanders was born 27 July 1910 in Watford, Hertfordshire to William Flanders and Emily Shaw. Flanders, rather than studying at university, opted to take up a position with the Internationaler Sozialistischer Kampfbund (ISK) or International Socialist League, a socialist non-Marxist, Leninist group in Germany. From 1929 to 1933, Flanders attended the ISK cadre school in Kassel where he learned to speak German and wrote for the organization. After the rise of the Nazis, Flanders left Germany to take over the operations of the ISK British division which was renamed the Socialist Vanguard Group (SVG). Throughout the 1930s and 1940s, Flanders wrote on substantive and philosophical matters relating to socialism, workers rights and labour reform, and editorials on contemporary politics in the SVG's publication Socialist Commentary as well as in other reviews.

After his return from Germany in 1932, Flanders continued to write for the SVG as well as writing for the German newspaper Der Funke. He also worked as a travelling salesman until the Second World War when he found work as a draughtsman, which he did throughout the war, working in a factory. From 1943, Flanders also began working for the Trades Union Congress and Allied Control Commission for Germany, moving back to Germany from 1946 to 1948. After working for the Control Commission, he accepted a Whitney Foundation fellowship to study industrial relations in the United States.

In 1949, after returning from the US, Flanders was offered a Senior Lecturer position at Oxford University in the field of industrial relations. At the time, he was not in possession of a university degree. At Oxford, Flanders met and worked with Hugh Clegg, considered another founding member of the Oxford School of Industrial Relations with whom he wrote and worked throughout his career. After working with multiple Nuffield College fellows during his academic career (including Clegg), Flanders was made fellow at Nuffield College, the graduate college for the social sciences at Oxford, in 1964.

Flanders remained at Nuffield until 1969, when he took a position as a commissioner for the Commission on Industrial Relations (CIR). In 1969, Flanders was also given the title of visiting professor in industrial relations at Manchester University. Flanders left the CIR citing ill health after contracting a debilitating disease which left him reliant on a wheelchair. After leaving the commission, Flanders was appointed reader of industrial relations at Warwick University in 1971, where he worked until his death on 29 September 1973.

=== Personal life ===
Flanders was married three times during his life. His first wife was Mary Saran, a fellow member of the ISK who helped set up the British Division. In 1950, he married Edith Moore, who died within the year. His third wife was Annemarie Klara Laura Tracinski, a former labour court judge in Germany, whom he married in 1951 and remained married to until his death. He had no children.

== Early works ==
Flanders' early works include an extensive amount of editorial publications for magazines such as The Vanguard, known later as the Socialist Vanguard, and Socialist Commentary. Flanders supplied copious amounts of articles for particularly the Vanguard or Socialist Vanguard, writing a total of thirty-six from 1934 to 1939. Pre-World War II, Flanders advocated revolutionary socialist thought. His writings during this time focused primarily on international politics rather than what dominated his later works, industrial relations. Themes of class struggle, the exploitative nature of capitalism, union militancy, anti-clericalism, opposition to communism and social democracy, and imperialism permeate his work in the 1930s. Following the onset of World War II, Flanders' shifted from revolutionary socialism towards social democracy and began delving into the central issues of industrial relations.

Flanders spent a considerable amount of time debating about the payment of war and the reconstruction after the war. This played an integral role in his future thinking revolving around industrial relations and trade unionism. His main literature at the time looked into the economic interests and relationships between workers and their employers. His views regarding inequality among different classes only grew stronger as he progressed in his work during the 1940s. His work in the Control Commission for Germany also played a key role in what he would publish in his later years regarding labour and class divides. Beginning in 1946, Allan Flanders began to quickly progress in the political field of Germany where he worked on a number of projects such as the revival of the Social Democrats, containing the German threat of communism by the Communist Party of Germany (KPD), and working to rebuild the German trade union movement.

== Later works ==
Flanders became more and more influential in British industrial relations until his death. During this time, Flanders continued to co-edit the Socialist Commentary and released many publications in his journal, and remained loyal to the ISK. Flanders' political activism continued in this time, as he sought to influence foreign policy, and in particular to counter support for the Soviet Union on the British left. In 1950, Flanders chaired the Socialist Union to work more closely with social democrats within the Labour Party shortly after their election in 1945. In 1956, the Socialist Union published Twentieth Century Socialism, which made the case for ethical socialism within the Labour Party. The group dissolved in 1959.

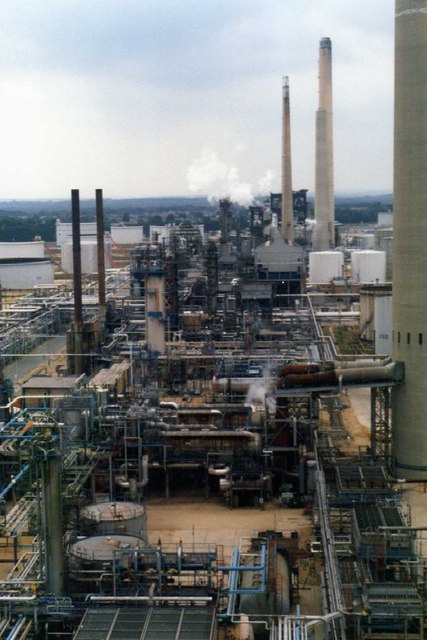
Fawley oil refinery

In 1964, Flanders wrote The Fawley Productivity Agreements, which follows the Esso Fawley Refinery's objective to increase productivity levels. The Esso Fawley refinery in Hampshire, England is the largest oil refinery in the United Kingdom, and at the time of writing employed over 1,000 people. The Esso experiment addressed explicitly an industrial relations problem that was more general and symptomatic for the British industry, low productivity levels and enduring high levels of overtime work combined with low wages. The Fawley plant was a revolutionary subject in England at the time, as the agreements hovered around topics of collective bargaining on labour rights in the UK and the 40-hour work week. In 1965, Flanders published Industrial Relations: What is wrong with the system? Again, Flanders stresses the importance of collective bargaining in the British industrial landscape. He also notes that job regulation is key in ensuring Britain remains on its trends of full employment in the post-World War II period. Flanders argues this is especially true of external regulation, which is key in ensuring proper employee-employer relations, but also of trade unions.

== Political views and transformation ==
Throughout his life, Flanders underwent changes to his political affiliations and foci. His political and intellectual development began with a focus on socialism, so much so that he migrated to Germany to join the ISK and pursue his interest in the topic through learning at the organization's Walkemuhle, or training school at 18, in 1929. He continued to pursue and write on anti-Marxist, Leninist socialism for decades until the postwar 1940s when he worked for the UK government. However, Flanders maintained links to issues around socialism including in work during his academic career as well as returning to co-edit the Socialist Vanguard and Socialist Commentary from 1971 to his death.

During his academic career, Flanders' works looked at issues surrounding trade unions, management, and pragmatic reforms in government and in trade organizations. However, Flanders' thought and mainstream political support migrated to gaitskellism and support of the UK Labour party's gaitskellite faction led by Hugh Gaitskell, opposing some issues and positions of British trade unions surrounding nationalization of private industries. Flanders also held an anti-communist position and opposed state socialism and supported ideas surrounding ethical socialism and the work of elite revolutionaries. These ideas saw Flanders support reform around the rights and dignity of workers rather than a focus on wage increases other associated activities.

== List of works ==
- British Trade Unionism, London 1948 (The Bureau of Current Affairs)
- An American Experiment in Trade Union Education 1950 (The Highway)
- A policy for wages, London 1950 (Fabian Publications) Pamphlet
- Trade Unions, London 1952 (Hutchinson)
- The System of Industrial Relations, Oxford 1954 (Blackwell) (with Hugh Clegg)
- The Fawley Productivity Agreements, London 1964 (Faber)
- Industrial Relations: What is wrong with the system? London 1965 (Institute of Personnel Management)
- Managerial Power and Industrial Democracy (1966)
- Collective Bargaining: Prescription for Change, London 1967 (Faber)
- Experiment in Industrial Democracy: Study of the John Lewis Partnership (Society Today & Tomorrow), London 1968 (Faber)
- Management and Unions: The Theory and Reform of Industrial Relations, London 1970 (Faber)
- The Tradition Of Voluntarism (International Journal of Employment Relations) 1974

== See also ==
- Types of socialism
- History of socialism
- Industrial Revolution
- Modern Records Centre, University of Warwick

== Bibliography ==
- Ackers, Peter, and Adrian Wilkinson. "British Industrial Relations Paradigm: A Critical Outline History and Prognosis." Journal of Industrial Relations 47, no. 4 (2005): 443–56. .
- Ackers, Peter. "Collective Bargaining as Industrial Democracy: Hugh Clegg and the Political Foundations of British Industrial Relations Pluralism." British Journal of Industrial Relations 45, no. 1 (2007): 77–101. .
- Banks, Robert F. "The Reform of British Industrial Relations : The Donovan Report and the Labour Government's Policy Proposals." Relations Industrielles 24, no. 2 (December 2005): 333–82. .
- Douglas, R. M. "No Friend of Democracy: The Socialist Vanguard Group 1941–50." Contemporary British History 16, no. 4 (2002): 51–86. .
- Flanders, Allan. Trade Unions and the Force of Tradition. Southampton, England: University of Southampton, 1969.
- Flanders, Allan. Management and Unions: the Theory and Reform of Industrial Relations. London: Faber & Faber, 1970.
- Gabriel, Yiannis. "Collective Bargaining: A Critique Of The Oxford School." The Political Quarterly 49, no. 3 (1978): 334–48. .
- Hyman, Richard. "Flanders, Allan David (1910–1973)." The Oxford Dictionary of National Biography, October 2009. .
- Hyman, Richard. "Ethical Socialism and the Trade Unions: Allan Flanders and British Industrial Relations Reform, By John Kelly, London: Routledge, 2010, 246 Pp., ISBN 978-0-415-87848-7." Relations Industrielles 66, no. 1 (2011): 150–51. .
- Kaufman, Bruce E. The Global Evolution of Industrial Relations: Events, Ideas and the IIRA. Geneva: International Labour Office, 2006.
- Kelly, John E. Ethical Socialism and the Trade Unions: Allan Flanders and British Industrial Relations Reform. London: Routledge, 2010.
- Kessler, Sid, and Gill Palmer. "The Commission on Industrial Relations in Britain 1969-74: a Retrospective and Prospective Evaluation." Employee Relations 18, no. 4 (1996): 6–96. .
