= Richard Saran =

German architect

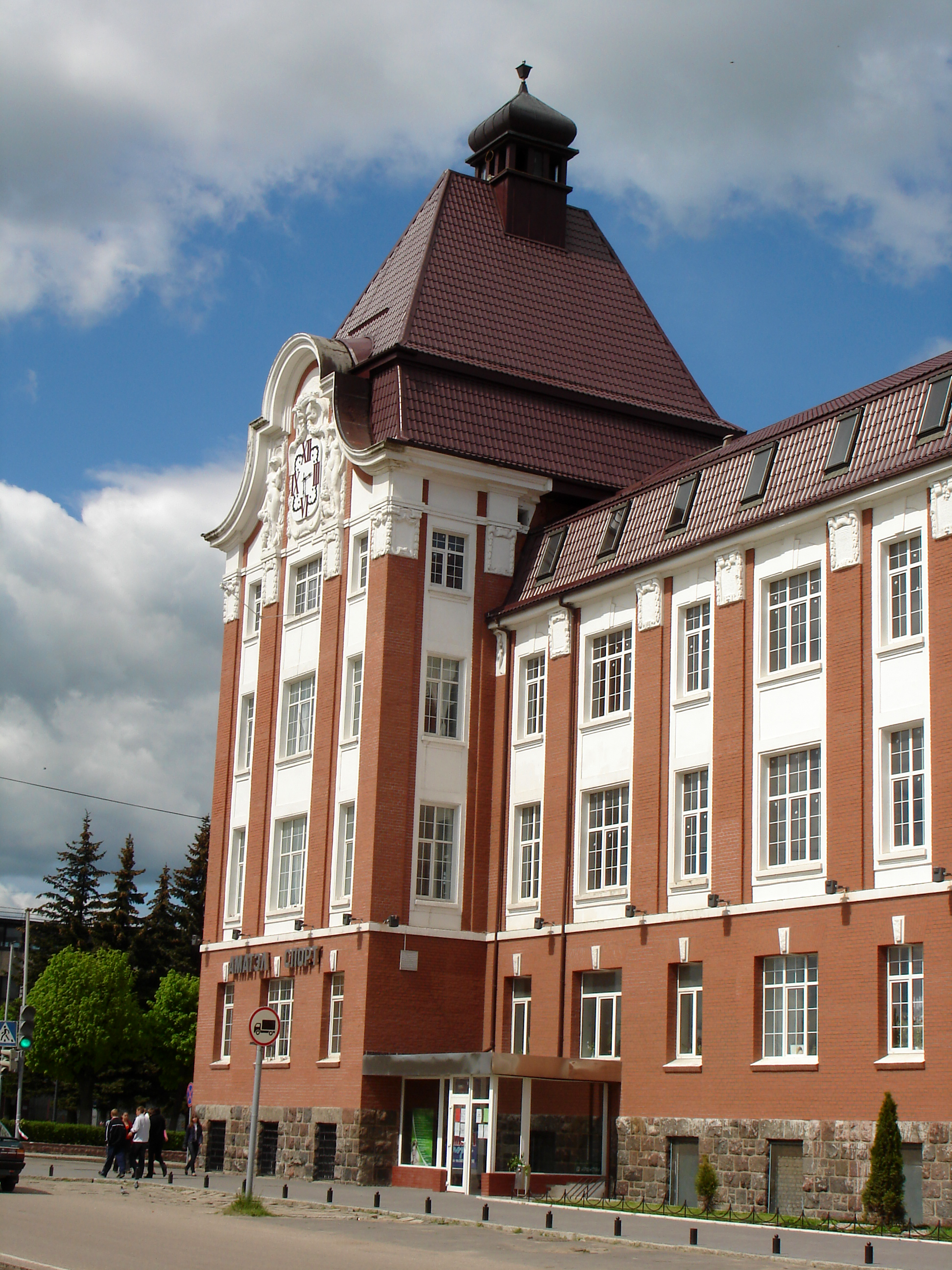
Annex of the district government in Gumbinnen (1908–1910)

Richard Saran, short for Alexander Richard Saran, (3 October 1852 – 4 (or 5) January 1925), was a German architect. He worked in the Prussian ministry and was involved in many state buildings.

== Career ==
Born in Magdeburg, the son of a parson, Saran studied at the pioneering Berlin Building Academy ("Bauakademie"), graduating in 1876. He worked in district governments of Magdeburg and Minden, from 1889 as Kreisbauinspektor in Wolmirstedt. From 1896 he was a Regierungs- und Baurat, working first in Königsberg, and from 1901 in Wiesbaden.

In 1906 Saran obtained a senior post with the Prussian Ministry of Public Works: many of his surviving commissions are government office buildings from the second part of the twentieth century's first decade. His duties covered regional government buildings construction projects, and he was also given responsibility over various personnel matters. Later on his scope was extended to cover construction projects undertaken by the Foreign Ministry, and he was given reporting responsibilities involving the building of theatres and museums. It was as part of this remit that in 1912 he was the recipient of massive criticism connected with drawn out planning process for rebuilding Berlin's New Royal Opera House, although many of the delays and other problems complained of were chiefly attributable to tensions involving freelance architects directly involved in the project and the planning authorities responsible.

During World War I Saran participated in planning for reconstruction in East Prussia, which had suffered much destruction at the hands of Imperial Russian Army during the opening hostilities.

== Family connections ==
Richard Saran was the father of the journalist Mary Saran, a brother in law of the diplomat Johannes Kriege and an uncle of the lawyer Walter Kriege.

== Selected buildings and designs ==
- 1907–1908: Catholic church St. Joseph in Eppenhain (Taunus)
- 1907–1909: Catholic church St. Josef in Frankfurt-Höchst
- 1907–1910: Administration buildings of the Oberpräsidium der Rheinprovinz in Koblenz
- 1908–1910: Annex of the district government in Gumbinnen
- 1908–1911: District government buildings in Allenstein
- 1918: Government buildings in Arolsen
