= Socialist Vanguard Group =

Political group in the UK in the early to mid 1900s

The Socialist Vanguard Group was a political group active in the United Kingdom, in various guises, from the 1920s to the 1950s. While always a small organisation, its journal and some of its members became highly influential in the right wing of the Labour Party.

== Early history ==
The group originated in the late 1920s, as a small group of British sympathisers of the Internationaler Sozialistischer Kampfbund (ISK), which followed the ideas of Leonard Nelson. Nelson argued for an ethical socialism which opposed democracy and religion and supported animal rights and trade unionism.

Gerhard Kumleben of the ISK travelled to England in 1928, seeking support for the group's ideas. He recruited three members: Allan Flanders, George Green and Edith Moore. By 1929, the English Group of the ISK had branches in London and Sheffield, and had a quarterly journal, entitled ISK.

In 1933, the ISK was banned in Germany, along with all other non-Nazi parties. One of its leaders, Mary Saran, left for the UK, where she reorganised the group. Boosted by the arrival of other Germany emigrants, it grew, slightly. In 1937, its publication was replaced by a monthly named The Vanguard, and it launched its own publishing wing, the International Publishing Company. The organisation also created an anti-Catholic group, the Council for the Investigation of Vatican Influence and Censorship, which was led by Jack White.

== Socialist Vanguard Group ==
During the 1930s, the group opposed the Labour Party, instead supporting the Popular Front movement. The failure of this approach to increase the membership or influence of the organisation led it, in 1941, to adopt a new name, the Socialist Vanguard Group, with an orientation towards supporting sympathetic figures in the Labour Party. It also relaunched its journal as Socialist Commentary.

The group was led jointly by Flanders, Moore and Saran, and remained affiliated to the ISK, even though the ISK had few remaining members outside the UK. They decided to adopt an entrist strategy, becoming active in the Fabian Society, Federal Union, National Council for Civil Liberties and Tribune, the left-wing weekly newspaper, in the hope of winning them to its ideals, while retaining a high requirements for loyalty and activity among its own members. In the Fabian Society, it found itself unable to gain influence, while in the other cases it soon came to believe that the organisations were not focused on worthwhile activities. However, the process did see some of its members become trusted within the Labour Party, with Green and Flanders joining Morgan Phillips' 30-person 1945 Group of key party activists.

The group decided that the key priority was to influence foreign policy, and in particular to counter support for the Soviet Union on the British left. In order to do so, it championed a federation of Western European countries. This gained it influence with several high-profile members of the Labour Party, and as a result, when Labour won the 1945 UK general election, the group gave its wholehearted support to the new government. The ISK was dissolved in 1946, and this finally left the group free to pursue its own distinctive line.

Rita Hinden, secretary of the Fabian Colonial Bureau, joined the group in 1947, despite opposing its positions on democracy and vegetarianism. The group leadership felt this was a great success and, in the hope of gaining even more influence among Labour Party officials, it changed the organisation's formal purpose to supporting the Labour government. It also separated Socialist Commentary from the group, it thereafter being published by the International Publishing Company. This enabled Phillips to write a letter to Labour groups, recommending that they purchase the newspaper, and boosted its circulation to 4,000 an issue, with contributors including Herbert Morrison, Harold Wilson, Jim Callaghan and Denis Healey. However, many members of the group questioned these changes, and it became apparent that it could not continue as it was.

== Socialist Union ==
In 1950, the group was reformed as the Socialist Union, with Flanders as its chair and Hinden as its secretary. It was hoped that this new organisation would work closely with social democrats within the Labour Party, and attract some of them to join. This had some initial success, as Fred Mulley agreed to become its treasurer, and Jim Griffiths served as honorary president, but membership peaked at only 102. In 1956, it published Twentieth Century Socialism, which argued in support of ethical socialism, and had significant influence in the Labour Party. Despite this, it became clear that the group was achieving little and failing to grow, so in 1959 it was dissolved.
