= New Royal Opera House in Berlin =

Coordinates: 52.5186°N 13.3692°E

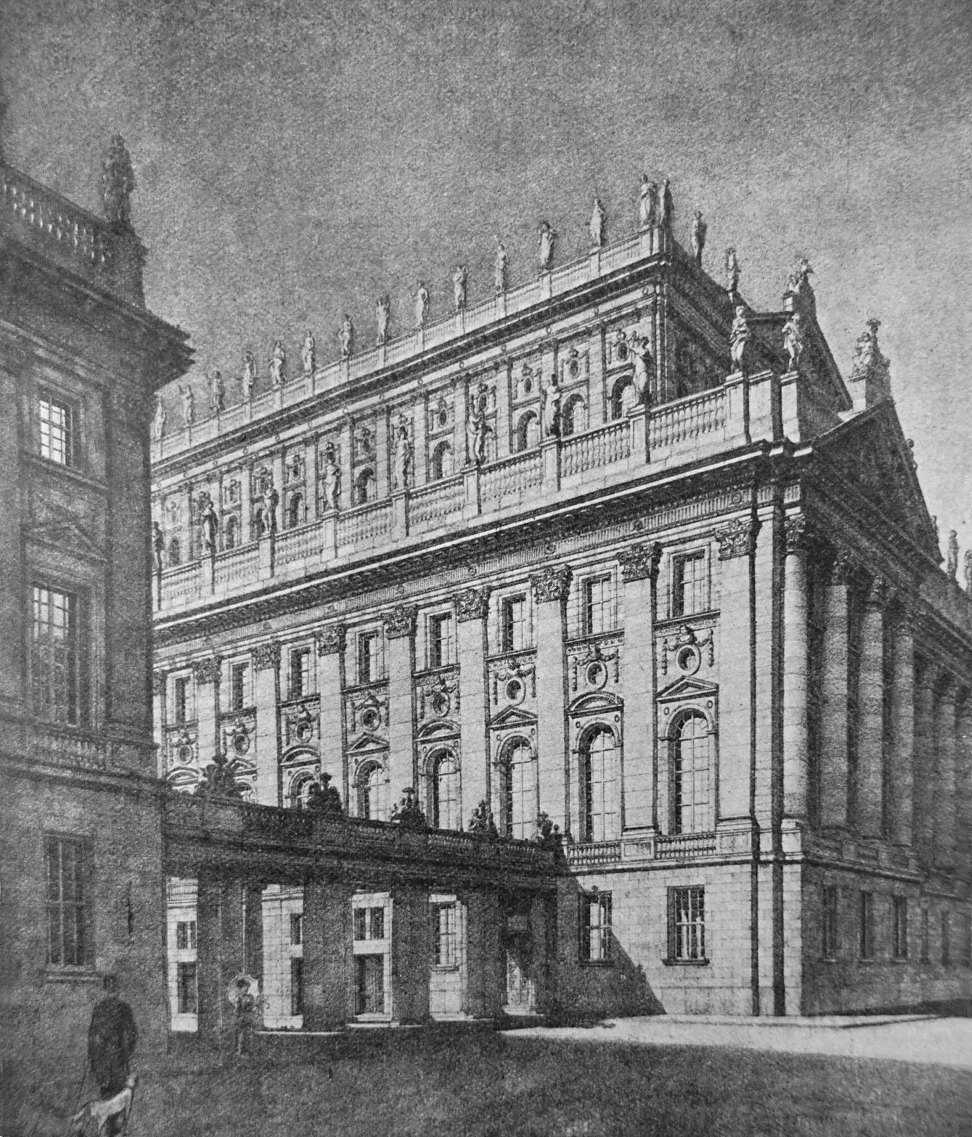
Final design by Ludwig Hoffmann, January 1914

The New Royal Opera House in Berlin was a project of the Prussian government and Kaiser Wilhelm II to build a new opera house in Berlin, which was prevented by the First World War and the financial shortage of the Weimar Republic. It was one of the most protracted and convoluted building projects of the imperial era. In 1924, the critic and journalist Paul Westheim described it as the "most grotesque architectural comedy of all time".

== Previous history ==
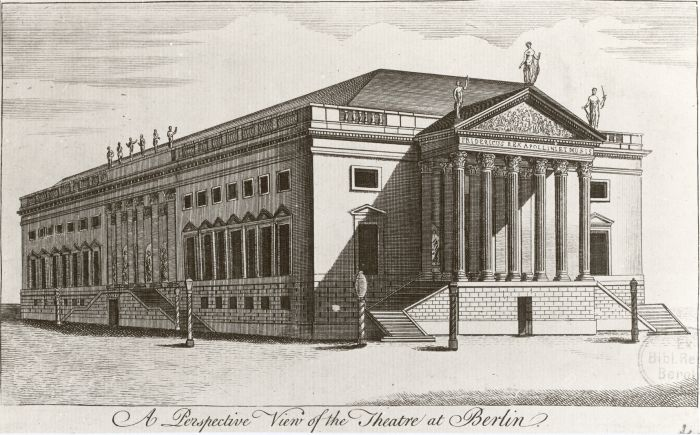
Berlin Royal Opera 1745

The plans for a new opera house were triggered by the Iroquois Theatre fire in Chicago on December 30, 1903. After the Berlin State Opera had previously been considered too small, with its 1,500 seats, its safety was now also in doubt. The Emperor sent a telegram to his Finance Minister Georg von Rheinbaben, suggesting a "speedy new building" and ending with the words: "I can no longer sleep peacefully at night". The Prussian government then began planning a new building for at least 2,500 spectators and demolished the old building.

== Designs by Felix Genzmer ==
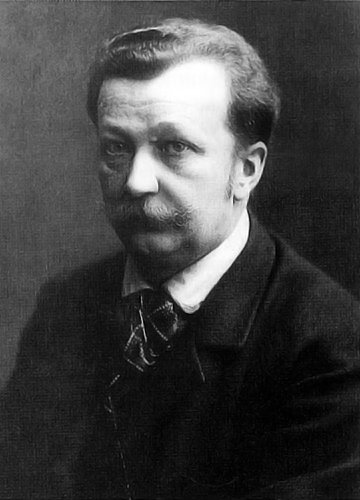
Felix Genzmer

The first choice for the new building project was the architect Felix Genzmer, who had worked as an architect for the royal theaters in Berlin and as a professor at the Charlottenburg Technical University after building the foyer of the State Theatre Wiesbaden. Genzmer was proposed by the General Director of the Royal Theatre Georg Graf von Hülsen-Haeseler and was also known and liked by the Emperor through his work in Wiesbaden. Between 1904 and 1905, Genzmer remodeled the interior of the Berlin Schauspielhaus, focusing on fire protection and a more representative interior. At the same time, he began plans for the new opera house.

Genzmer's commission was met with criticism, especially from the national associations of architects. The opera house was the only major project planned at the time, and the architects demanded a competition, while the Kaiser rejected competitions on principle. Genzmer himself was also criticized, for example by the publicist Maximilian Harden, who wrote in the Zukunft in 1906:

"Besides Messel, we have Gabriel Seidl in Munich, Fischer in Stuttgart, Wallot in Dresden, Behrens in Düsseldorf, Licht in Leipzig, and perhaps many others. Why must the most incompetent be appointed to a task that is the lifelong dream of every artist? Because the emperor does not find him unfit and likes to work with the comfortable man? Is that the only reason? Should that alone decide?"

— From: Maximilian Harden: Das neue Opernhaus. In: Die Zukunft, 55, 1906

In 1906, Genzmer presented his first plans, which the Emperor rejected, as he did not want to see "the simple but elegant architecture from Frederick the Great's time, which dominates the area around the current opera house, damaged by a colossal building". Genzmer needed to develop a new project for the Königsplatz opposite the Reichstag building, where the Kroll Opera House had been converted into the "New Royal Opera Theater" in 1896 and considerably more space was available.

The plans presented by Felix Genzmer in 1909 called for the opera house to be built south of the east–west axis on Königsplatz, with a second building on the north side. This design was rejected by the Prussian Ministry of Public Works because:

"The idea of erecting a building of the importance and size of the opera house to the side of the center line of Königsplatz must be described as misguided and unacceptable from a general artistic point of view."

— According to Döhl 2004, from the report of December 4, 1909

However, expert opinions were a task of the Prussian Academy of Civil Engineering, not the ministry itself.

The ministry also had a problem with the cost of the new building - mainly because the financing had not been clarified at the time. The main issue was the shares to be paid by the Prussian state and the Crown. The Crown did not want to make a significant contribution to the construction, although the Emperor considered the new building to be "his" opera house. Even the contribution of the Kroll Opera property by the Crown without compensation was questioned internally. The imperial advisor Count Philipp zu Eulenburg described the building as a cultural task of the state; on the other hand, the Prussian Ministry of Finance could find no reason to erect a building with rooms for the court without a contribution from the court. From the finance minister's point of view, it was almost impossible to explain this distribution of costs to the Prussian House of Representatives and to enforce it. After Genzmer's second plan had also been rejected, the view prevailed that he was not the right architect for the planned building, especially as external pressure from the architects' associations and the public increased. Graf von Hülsen-Haeseler, at whose suggestion Genzmer had already been chosen, apparently wanted to appoint another architect for the project first, and on January 11, 1910, he sent a non-binding request to the Berlin city planning commissioner Ludwig Hoffmann, who declined.

== First architects competition ==
On March 28, 1910, Graf von Hülsen-Haeseler cautiously suggested to Wilhelm II that several architects should compete in a closed competition (restricted competition) for the construction of the opera house. His argument was the importance of the building, which should be a monument to the glorious reign of Wilhelm II. He emphasized the architects' interest in the building and stressed that the competition should be a non-binding call for proposals (ideas competition), which should bring out the best ideas. The Emperor himself was to remain the final decision-maker. The Emperor finally agreed to the competition, but rejected a review committee (jury) and made it clear that he would not give the architects a free hand under any circumstances. He commented on the proposal accordingly:

"In the competition -ad informationem Regis- the point of view should be maintained that it is not a competition in the usual sense, but only the provision of ideas material for ME, the BUILDER, no matter to which man I subsequently entrust MY IDEA PROPOSAL for execution. The building should proclaim the glory of all those involved."

— Marginal remarks on a report by Count Hülsen-Haeseler to Wilhelm II. Capitalization according to source. After Döhl, 2004

The proposal also met with the approval of the Ministry of Public Works and the Ministry of Finance, which saw the competition as a way to solve the critical issue of financing. The Budget Commission of the Prussian House of Representatives had to be persuaded to approve the use of a tender to cover the costs.

On June 28, the ministries involved developed the framework conditions for the competition. The site of the Kroll Opera House continued to be considered, but the architects were also allowed to suggest alternatives. The opera itself was to have 2,250 seats, with an "amphitheater" as the final tier in addition to the stalls and four tiers. An entrance wing with a representative entrance hall (vestibule) and box offices as well as a staircase hall with access to the stalls and the first tier were to be built in front of the auditorium. Two foyers for the different tiers and the stalls were also to be planned. An important part of the planning included the area for the courtyard. This would include a large banquet box on the first tier with 80 seats, as well as additional seating in the stalls and on the first tier of the left stage vestibule (proscenium). The boxes were to be equipped with various lounges and a separate entrance was to be provided on the left side. All courtyard areas should be interconnected, but separated from the rest of the audience.

In August 1910, the selected architects were notified; in addition to Felix Genzmer, they were Eduard Fürstenau, Ludwig Hoffmann, Ernst von Ihne, Anton Karst, Max Littmann, Heinrich Seeling and Friedrich von Thiersch. The choice fell on architects who had already worked successfully for the Kaiser and whose work had impressed him. Anton Karst was consulted by the Emperor himself due to his new building of the Royal Court Theater in Kassel (predecessor of today's Staatstheater Kassel). Max Littmann and Heinrich Seeling in particular were well-known theater architects. The designs submitted by the selected architects were to be transferred to the state as property with unrestricted right of disposal in return for payment of a fee. Ludwig Hoffmann did not take part in this tender, citing his various tasks for the city of Berlin and a development plan for the city of Athens, which he was currently working on.

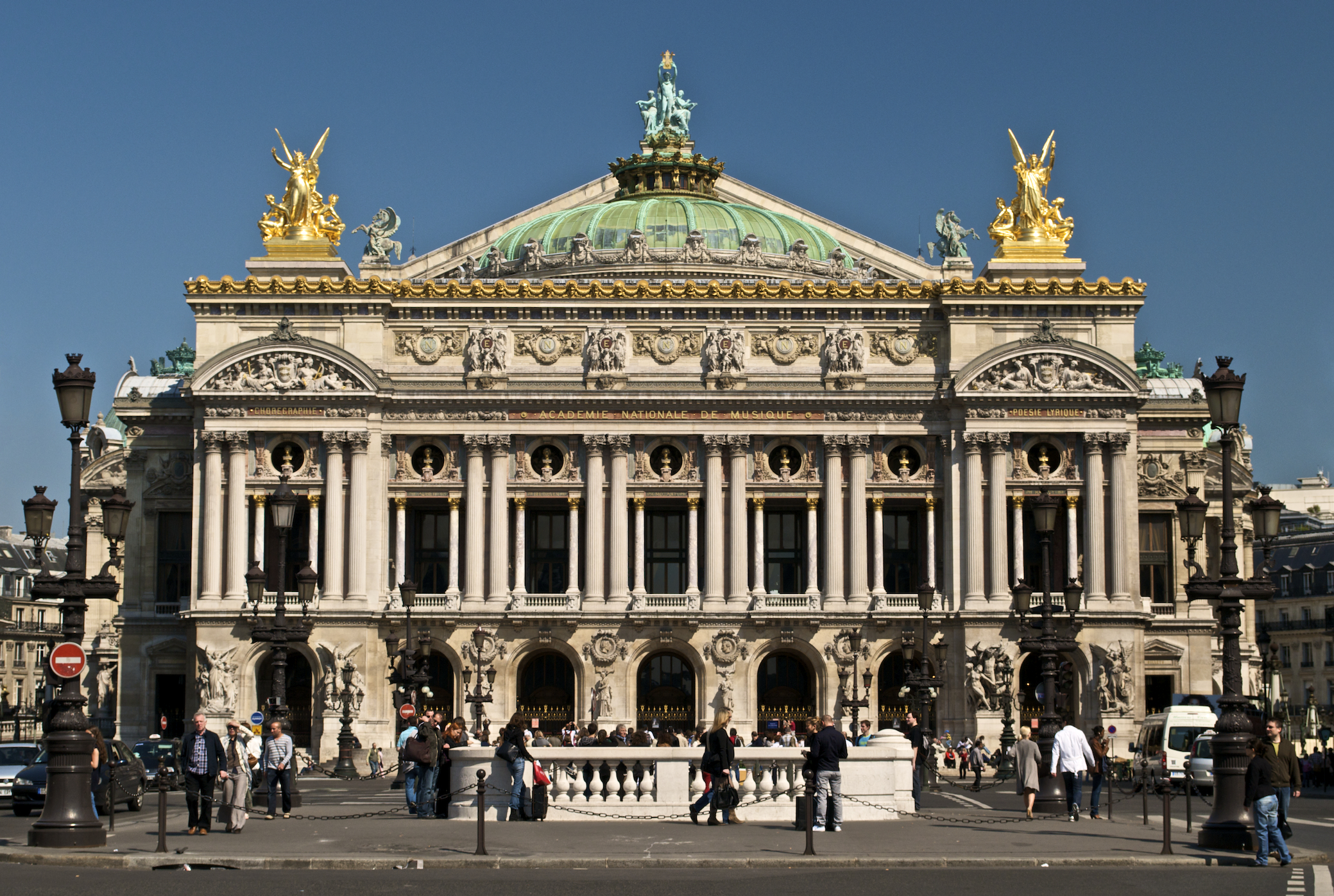
Opéra Garnier, Paris

The ministries justified the limited competition to the public by citing the particular technical difficulties of the building. However, this could not calm the criticism that was voiced by both the press and architectural associations. The latter called for an open competition, referring in particular to the construction of the Paris Opera. The lack of a jury and the lack of a binding contract award to the competition winner provoked further criticism, which violated the basic rules of competition postulated by the associations. As a result, the Berliner Tageblatt of September 2, 1910 reported:

"If no better men were known at the top or did not dare to propose them to the emperor, then a general competition had to be held. Such a task is not for embarrassed and considerate candidates. And the general competition would hardly have cost more than the eighty thousand marks paid to the participants in this narrow competition, which was hardly fruitful in the higher sense. The decision, which, it seems, the ministries have reserved for themselves - no judges are named - will by no means be a final one. The state parliament still has a say, and the architectural community will certainly not miss the opportunity to inform it about the competition and its nature."

— From: Fritz Stahl: Das neue Berliner Opernhaus. Ein sehr enger Wettbewerb, Berliner Tageblatt of September 2, 1910

The results were available at the beginning of December 1910. Von Ihne and Littmann in particular integrated key elements of Charles Garnier's Paris Opera into their design, including the central multi-story grand staircase within a separate central space between the foyer and the auditorium. Further ideas were provided by the Vienna State Opera of Eduard van der Nüll and August Siccard von Siccardsburg. Based on the results, the ministers involved suggested the joint creation of a floor plan. They suggested that this should be carried out by the participants Ernst von Ihne, Heinrich Seeling, and Friedrich von Thiersch. Under pressure from the court, the Ministry of Public Works and the Ministry of Finance agreed at the end of 1910 to regard the construction of the opera house as a Prussian state building and thus to finance it at state expense with a subsidy from the Crown. The further organization was completely under the control of the Ministry of Public Works. The Emperor set a total sum of three million marks as the Crown's contribution. The Emperor also agreed to a closer competition between Ernst von Ihne, Heinrich Seeling, and (in contrast to the ministries' proposal) Max Littmann.

== Second architects competition ==
In preparation for this follow-up competition, the government architect Hans Grube drew up a preliminary design at the Ministry of Public Works as a basis for further planning. This included floor plans and a facade view of the planned building. The designs were very well received and Grube was subsequently admitted as the fourth participant in the competition; his plans formed the template for the official program outline and thus the binding prerequisite on which the participants had to base their new designs. On October 3, the architects were asked to submit their new designs, and the results were available in February 1912. The results of both rounds of the competition were publicly exhibited in the House of Deputies in March 1912, with the plans from the short competition forming the basis for the final building. Wilhelm II preferred the results of the building official Grube. On March 6, the confidential building council Richard Saran from the Ministry of Public Works presented the current status of the discussions in a speech to the House of Representatives:

"After careful joint deliberation, we were unable to avoid the conclusion that the designs by Seeling and Littmann did not meet the justified demands of the administration, so that they had to be eliminated for further processing despite their other advantages, the beauty of the architecture and attractive details. This is also true of the design by Ihnes, even if it is not so unapologetic. Grube's preliminary design was considered by the theater administration to be the best basis for the development of the actual building design and we could not disagree with this view."

— from Saran,1912

The construction was scheduled to begin in April 1913.

The decision was heavily criticized in the press and by the public. In particular, the ministries' handling of the limited competition and the fact that the winning design was submitted by an unknown civil servant were highly criticized. The press again called for an open competition, and on March 14, 1912, the Association of Berlin Architects passed a resolution with the same demand. On April 20 of the same year, the Association of German Architects decided that an open competition should be held for the construction of the opera house after the building program had been redefined and a vote taken in the House of Representatives. This criticism, in which all parliamentary groups spoke out against the planned continuation of the project, reached the House of Representatives. On May 2, the House of Representatives passed a bill calling for a new design "with the participation of other circles of the German artistic community. The resolution called for an open competition in which participants would be allowed to deviate from the program sketch, with the Prussian Academy of Architecture making the final assessment. The deputies thus clearly decided against the intentions of Kaiser Wilhelm II. The SDP delegate Karl Liebknecht made it very clear:

"There is an extraordinarily great danger - since ultimately only a 'client', the 'beneficiary authority', as it has been called from time to time, has to decide on the building, although we have to approve the money here - that the artistic expression of some authoritative artistic mood and conception of our time or of the best forces of our time will not be found, but that ultimately only the artistic mood and conception of a single person will decide."

— from the 62nd session of the House of Representatives on May 2, 1912, according to Döhl, 2004

== Third architects competition ==
The third competition for the opera house was announced by the Ministry of Public Works in June 1912. Although this competition was now actually open, the architects Hermann Billing in Karlsruhe, Wilhelm Brurein in Berlin, Martin Dülfer in Dresden, Theodor Fischer in Munich, Georg Frentzen in Aachen, Otto March in Berlin, Bruno Möhring in Berlin, Carl Moritz in Cologne, Bruno Schmitz in Berlin and the architectural partnership Lossow & Kühne (William Lossow and Max Hans Kühne) in Dresden were contacted directly and invited to take part. Like the first selection, this one also consisted mainly of architects who already had experience in the construction of theaters or similar buildings and had made a positive impression on the emperor. Of those invited, only Theodor Fischer canceled, all others confirmed their participation. In addition to this group of people, anyone who was a member of the Association of German Architects and Engineers (VDAI) or the Association of German Architects (BDA) was allowed to attend.

The work was based on three ground plan drawings on which the projects were to be built. In October 1912, a total of 68 designs were submitted, on which the Prussian Academy of Architecture commented. The jury's verdict was that none of the designs were so superior to the previous designs that they could be recommended as the basis for construction. The designs by Otto March, Richard Seel, Martin Dülfer, Carl Moritz, and the contribution by the architectural office of Peter Jürgensen and Jürgen Bachmann (Berlin) were particularly highlighted. The jury also recommended a simplification of the building program, but this was rejected by the General Director. Ludwig Hoffmann was one of the experts from the academy's building construction department.

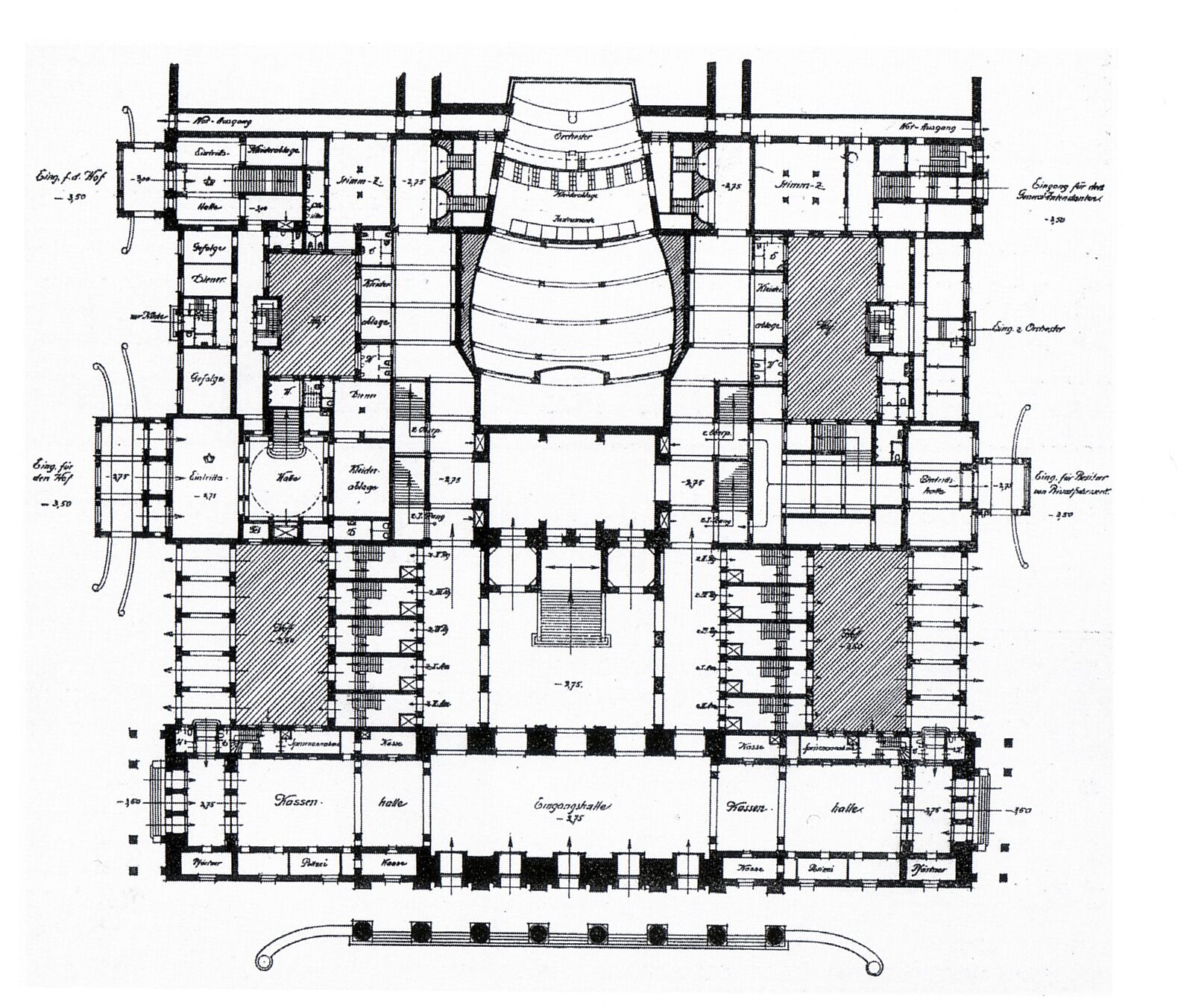
First floor

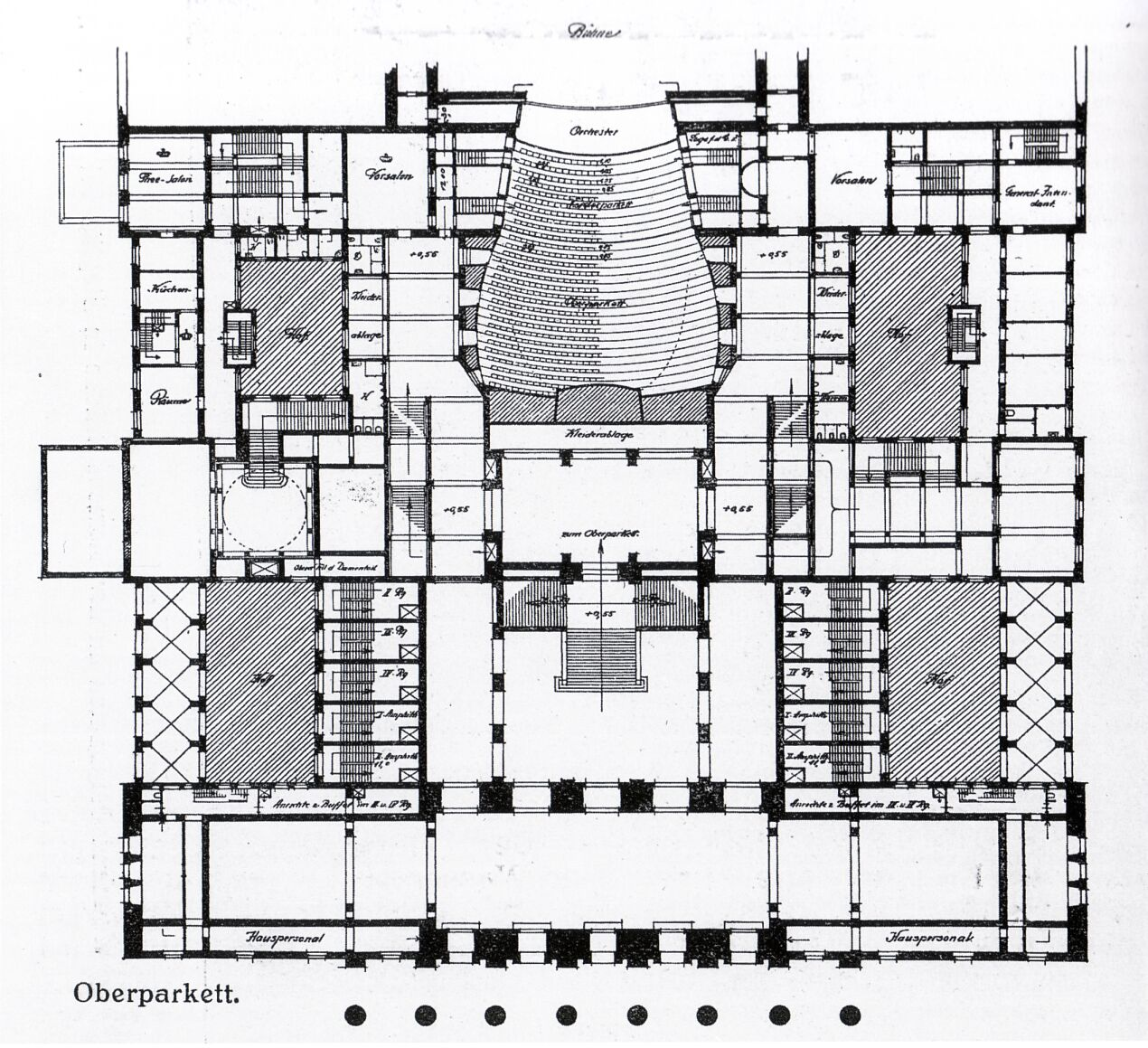
Top floor

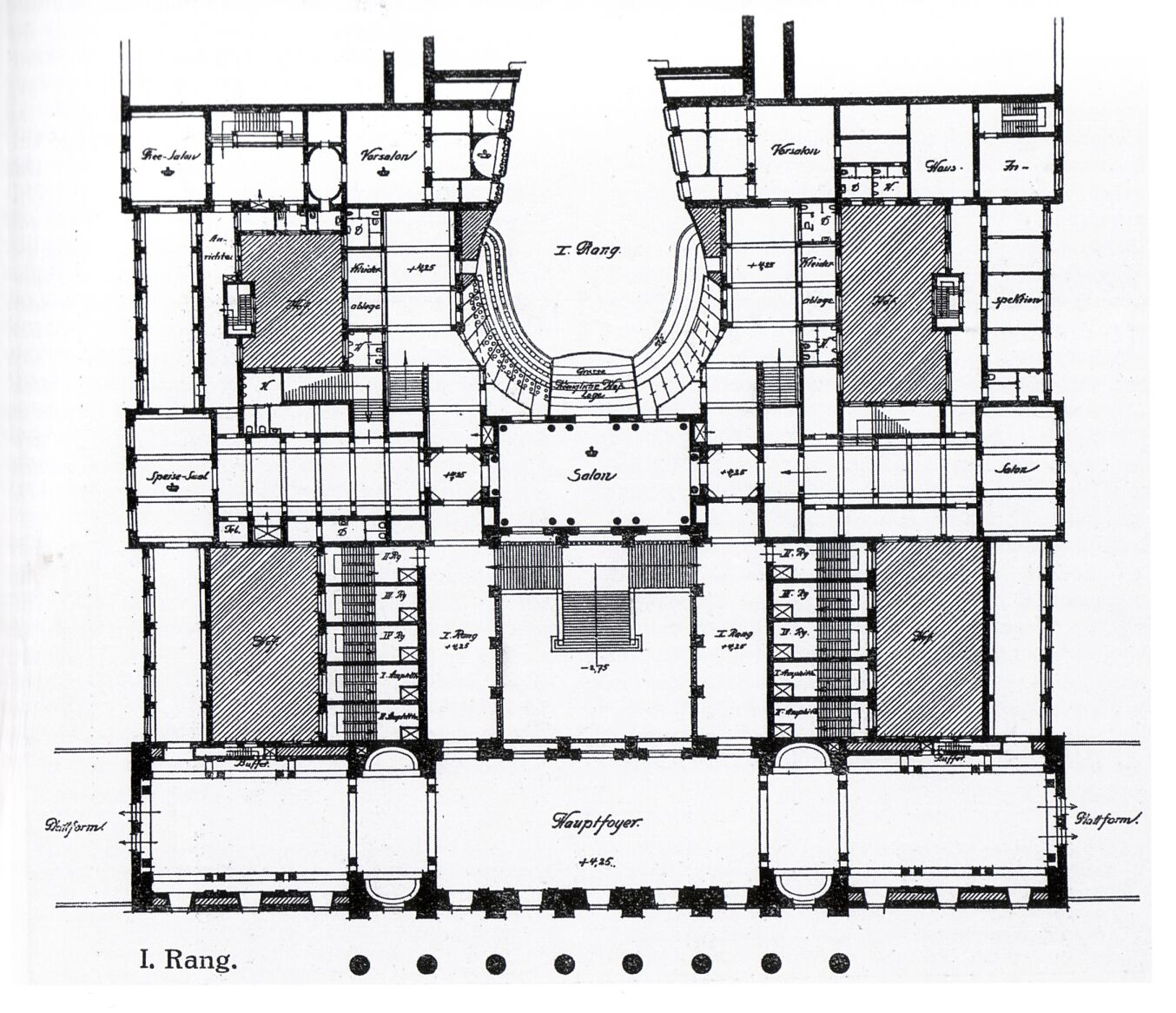
1st rank

The results of the third competition were publicly exhibited in January 1913. Although the press agreed that the competition represented progress, there was no result on the question of which design was the best. The favorite was the design by Otto March, but it was not ultimately convincing either. Again, there was criticism of the entire building concept, with calls for the entire Königsplatz to be redesigned. However, one result was clear: the third competition did not produce a winner and therefore no architect for the opera house. On February 13, 1913, the Prussian House of Representatives passed a resolution that the government should find and commission an independent architect who would incorporate the best proposals of all previous concepts into one design. A new competition was to be held for the Königsplatz. However, this decision was not unanimous; Karl Liebknecht, for example, strongly criticized it:

"It is shameful the fact that, the Chamber of Deputies, after having dared to contradict a little last year, incited by the artists and their opposition, has now completely kowtowed to the Royal State Government, to the building authorities."

— from the 131st session of the House of Representatives on February 13, 1913, according to Döhl, 2004

== Designs by Ludwig Hoffmann ==
Only very few people were considered for the selection of an architect who had so far been largely uninvolved, as all known architects and specialists had already expressed their opinions on the opera house issue. One of the few was the Berlin city planning officer Ludwig Hoffmann, who had been approached several times but had so far declined the task each time. In April 1913, he was asked again whether he would like to design and build this building. However, Hoffmann continued to show no interest in this, mainly due to his rather poor experience with the realization of the Pergamon Museum on Berlin's Museum Island, designed by Alfred Messel. He was put off by working with the General Directorate of the Royal Theatres, and at this time Hoffmann's main interest lay in the construction of social and welfare buildings. He wrote about this in his memoirs:

"After my experience in building museums, it seemed to me that working successfully with the general directorate of the theaters as a client was quite doubtful, and I was so overburdened with large tasks that I did not long for a new one at the time. It was also more important to me now to ease the plight of many thousands of people over the years in the large municipal welfare buildings than to build magnificent spaces for a theater-going public."

— From Ludwig Hoffmann: Lebenserinnerungen eines Architekten

However, after Kaiser Wilhelm II also wanted Ludwig Hoffmann to take over the construction and Lord Mayor Adolf Wermuth insisted, Hoffmann finally agreed. On May 4, 1913, he gave the ministry his promise to participate in the new building. He wanted to concentrate on the artistic issues and the ministry was to take on the structural engineering tasks.

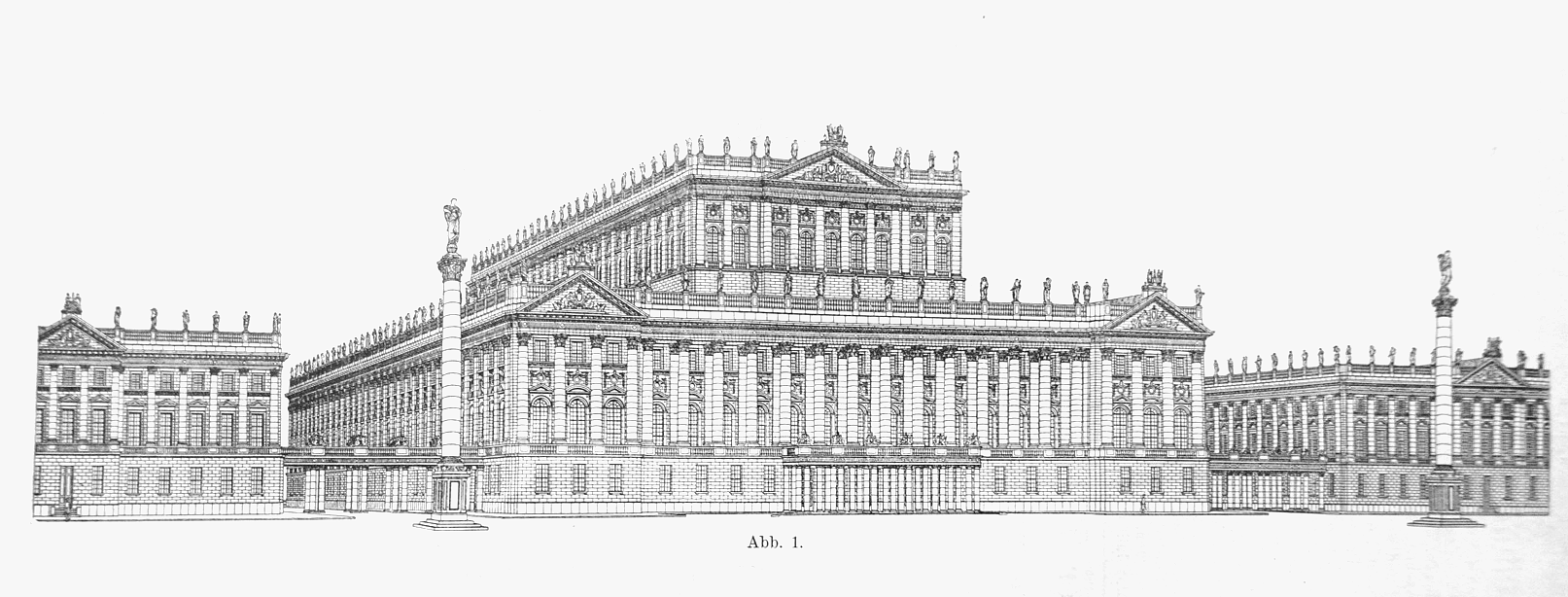
The perspective of the final facade design, January 1914

On May 9, 1913, Ludwig Hoffmann submitted an exposition of his ideas for the new opera house. He had already studied the building in detail, as he had been a member of the expert committee for the designs in 1912. Hoffmann presented the first drafts in the form of facade drawings at Pentecost that year. The three pencil drawings, dated May 11, 1913, showed alternative fronts for the Opera House, some flanked by other, previously unplanned buildings, to illustrate the further development of the square. The public only found out about Hoffmann's involvement in the construction at the end of May, but the response in the press to this selection was very positive and at the same time associated with high expectations. The design was to be completed together with a cost estimate in December, and Hoffmann was also to adhere to the program sketch as far as possible. On November 5, Hoffmann had the Kaiser confirm the approval of his designs, and in December he submitted a cost estimate of 19.5 million marks (adjusted for purchasing power in today's currency: around 125.5 million euros). After a meeting with the Minister of Finance, some savings were agreed, particularly in the design of the interior and the depot building, which was to be connected to the opera house.

In January 1914, Ludwig Hoffmann presented a model of the building to the imperial couple in a studio set up especially for the purpose. The Emperor was satisfied and agreed to the construction of the opera house. The final plans, views, sections, and perspectives were also published in the central journal of the building administration, together with Ludwig Hoffmann's explanations of the design. On May 19, 1914, the Prussian Ministry of Labor approved the first construction installment, but the outbreak of World War I prevented construction.

== Architectural view of Hoffmann's design ==
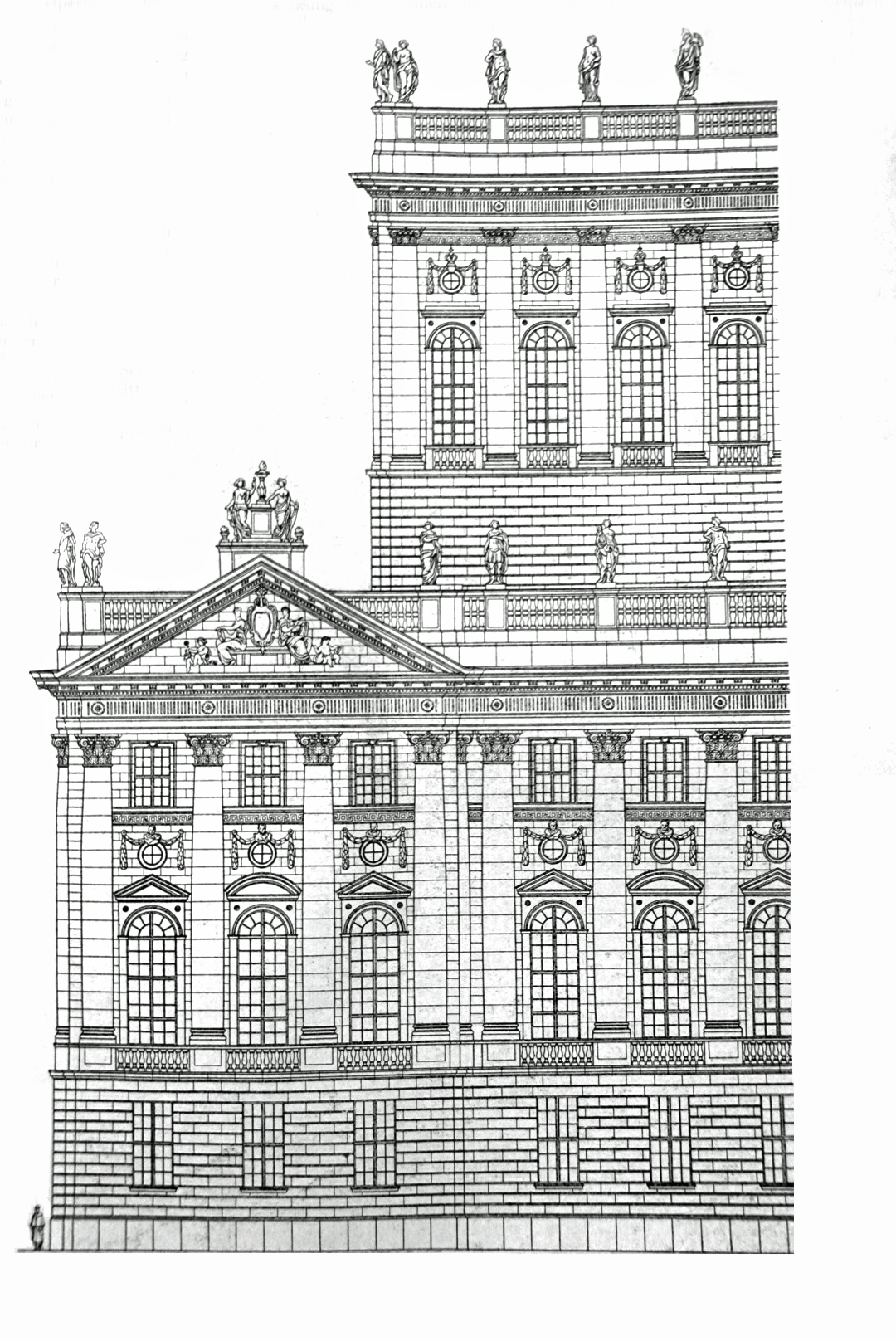
Detailed view of a side risalit

As the commissioned architect, Ludwig Hoffmann was to adhere even more closely to the basic plans than the participants in the competition. However, Hoffmann still tried to change the façade in particular to suit his ideas. While the original plan, for example, provided for a large triangular pediment with eight supporting columns (portico) at the emperor's request, Hoffmann planned a spacious vestibule with a colonnade of Corinthian columns with only a discreet pediment. He also made the window axes narrower than intended and planned the entire building to be 96 meters wide, four meters wider than the specifications called for. A spacious foyer was to be created behind the portico. Hoffmann placed the cash desks, which were to be built to the side of a central vestibule, at the two outermost ends and equipped each of these areas with its projection (Risalit), which was to accommodate further ancillary rooms.

One of the main problems with the floor plan was the strong impression of the square box-shaped building, which was to be concealed in the designs of the various competition participants by projections and designs of the portico. Hoffmann attempted to create an elongated impression by projecting the stage body over the auditorium and creating a central staircase hall, which he visually aligned with the Berlin Schauspielhaus. In the overall picture, however, it was the extension in length that posed the greater problem, especially since, for reasons of cost, the building was not to occupy the entire width of the Königsplatz, which made the disproportion even more obvious. For this reason, Hoffmann planned functional buildings immediately adjacent to both sides and an emphasis on the outer edges, while he preferred not to emphasize the central part. In addition to the aforementioned risalits, the colonnade, an open portico built over two stories, was intended to reinforce this effect. Large arched windows were planned for the main floor. The balustrade surrounding the building was to be accentuated by elaborate figural decoration.

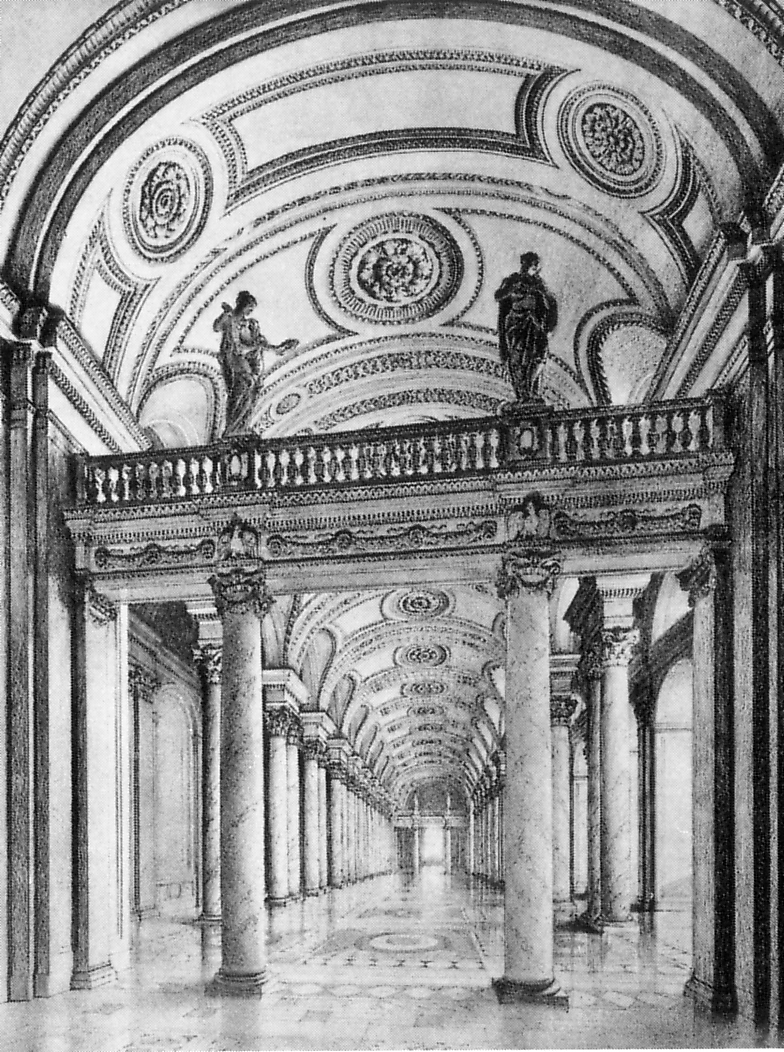
Design of the foyer

Inside, Hoffmann divided the building into a stage section and an audience section. The audience section forms the center of the building, with a large staircase and a foyer in front of it. Four atriums further divide the building. The central entrance was to be located on Königsplatz, through which one was to enter a transverse vestibule that was to occupy the entire width of the building. A few steps lead to the central staircase or the side corridors. A wide staircase in the central stairwell and further stairs in the side corridors lead to the first tier, and two staircases behind the main hall lead to the upper stalls. The auditorium was to consist of four tiers, spanned by additional rows of seats in the style of an amphitheater; the ceremonial box and the three-part proscenium boxes were architecturally emphasized. A large foyer was to be set up above the entrance hall for breaks, and other common rooms were located throughout the building.

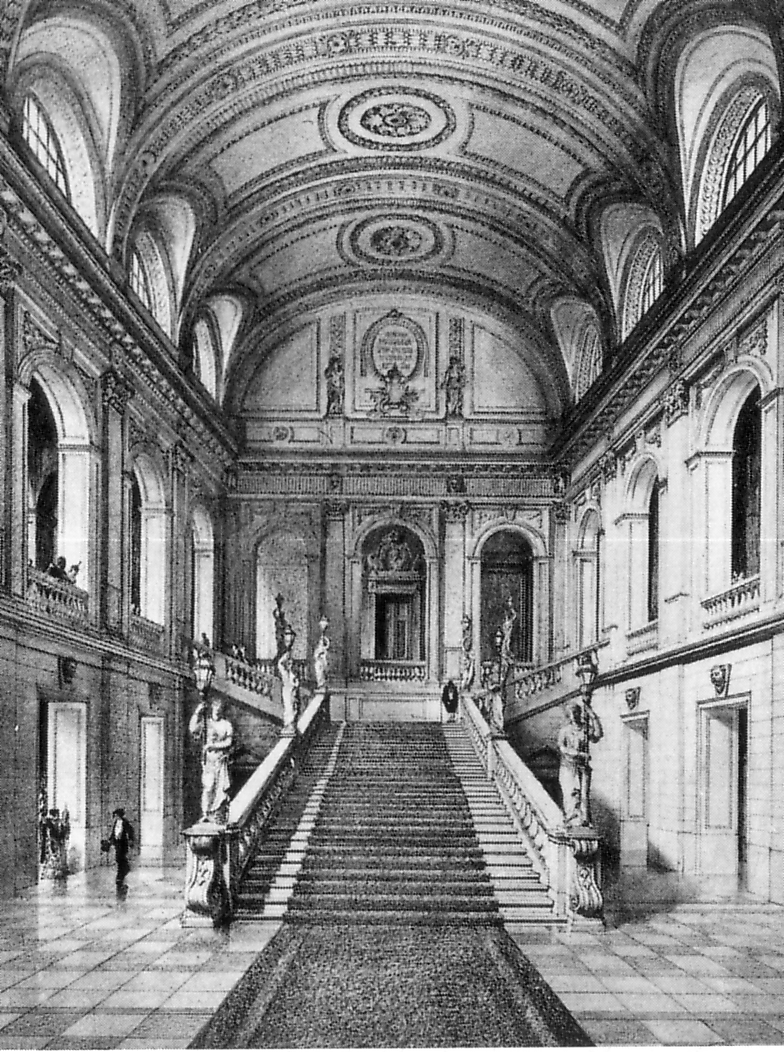
Design of the staircase

A separate side entrance was created for visitors to the Imperial Lodge. It led up a flight of stairs to a large salon in front of the ceremonial box. This entrance was only intended to cross the spectators' path to the side of the salon, so that the two groups of visitors were well separated. Other rooms for members of the court were grouped around the rear left atrium. A passage to the boxes on the proscenium was created by way of a dining room and a tea room.

== People's Opera ==
After the First World War, Ludwig Hoffmann was asked by Adolph Hoffmann, the new Prussian Minister of Culture from the ranks of the ISDP, to reconsider the project as a public opera house. The audience capacity was to be increased to 3,000 seats, so Ludwig Hoffmann extended the stalls with a steeper elevated curve. The composer Richard Strauss, who had been consulted, was enthusiastic about the idea, as it would allow the audience to see the singers in their entirety over the heads of those seated in front of them. However, these plans did not materialize, and instead of the People's Opera, the old Kroll Opera House, which stood on the planned site, was modernized between 1920 and 1923.

== Bibliography ==
- Die Bauwerke und Kunstdenkmäler von Berlin. Supplement 10. Lebenserinnerungen eines Architekten – Ludwig Hoffmann. Published and edited by Wolfgang Schäche. Mann Brothers, Berlin 1983, ISBN 3-7861-1388-2
- Dörte Döhl: Ludwig Hoffmann – Bauten für Berlin 1896-1924. Ernst Wasmuth, Tübingen 2004. ISBN 3-8030-0629-5
- Hans Schliepmann: Die neuen Entwürfe zum Berliner Königlichen Opernhaus. Berliner Architekturwelt, Special issue 12. Berlin: Wasmuth, 1913. Digitized by the Central and Regional Library Berlin, 2020. https://nbn-resolving.de/urn:nbn:de:kobv:109-1-15382701
- Saran: Die bisherige Entwicklung der Vorbereitungen zum Neubau eines Königlichen Opernhauses in Berlin. In: Zentralblatt der Bauverwaltung. Ernst, Berlin 1912, p. 133 f. ISSN 0372-8021
- Maximilian Harden: Das neue Opernhaus. In: Maximilian Harden (Hrsg.) Die Zukunft. Die Zukunft, Berlin 1906, ISBN 3-89131-445-0
- Fritz Stahl: Das neue Berliner Opernhaus. Ein sehr enger Wettbewerb. In: Berliner Tageblatt, September 2, 1910, Mosse, Berlin.
- Paul Seidel: Der Kaiser und die Kunst. Sound, Berlin 1907.
- Paul Westheim, in: Das Kunstblatt. Ed. Paul Westheim. Reckendorf, Berlin 8.1924, S. 135.
- Zentralblatt der Bauverwaltung, No. 8, Berlin January 28, 1914, p. 61–65
