= Royal Commission on Trade Unions and Employers' Associations =

The Royal Commission on Trade Unions and Employers' Associations (also known as the Donovan Commission) was an inquiry into the system of collective UK labour law, chaired by Lord Donovan and heavily influenced by the opinions of Hugh Clegg. Its report, known as the "Donovan Report", was issued in 1968 (Cmnd 3623).

== Overview ==
The Commission originally was inclined to recommend legal constraints on unions, (as presaged by Barbara Castle's White paper, In Place of Strife), in order to back up governmental prices and incomes policy. However Clegg, by threatening to issue a minority report, persuaded it instead to back improved collective bargaining.

The recommendations of the Commission on dismissal procedures were embodied in the Industrial Relations Act 1971. Exclusive jurisdiction to hear complaints and give remedies was conferred upon the newly created National Industrial Relations Court. The Trade Union and Labour Relations Act 1974 soon replaced the unfair dismissal provisions, as was the National Industrial Relations Court with a system of Industrial Tribunals, since renamed Employment Tribunals. These have one legally qualified chairperson and two lay members, one representing unions and the other representing employers.

The present law on unfair dismissal is found in the Employment Rights Act 1996.

== Report chapters ==
1. Introduction
2. The Subject Matter of Our Report
3. The System of Industrial Relations
4. The Reform of Collective Bargaining
5. The Extension of Collective Bargaining
6. The Efficient Use of Manpower
7. Strikes and Other Industrial Action
8. The Enforcement of Collective Agreements
9. Safeguards of Employees Against Unfair Dismissal
10. Labour Tribunals
11. Safeguards for Individuals in Relation to Trade Unions
12. Trade Unions
13. Employers' Associations
14. Changes in the Law
15. Workers' Participation in Management
16. Summary of the Main Conclusions and Recommendations

== See also ==
- United Kingdom labour law
- Terence Donovan, Baron Donovan
- Hugh Clegg (academic)
