= Nursing education in the United Kingdom =

Nursing education in the United Kingdom is the academic and practical education delivered before and after registration as a nurse in the United Kingdom. This is typically delivered through a bachelor's degree in nursing, followed by various postgraduate qualifications and smaller professional development modules. All pre-registration courses deliver learning split between academic study and clinical practice, whilst postgraduate courses may specialise in one of the two.

== Pre-registration education ==
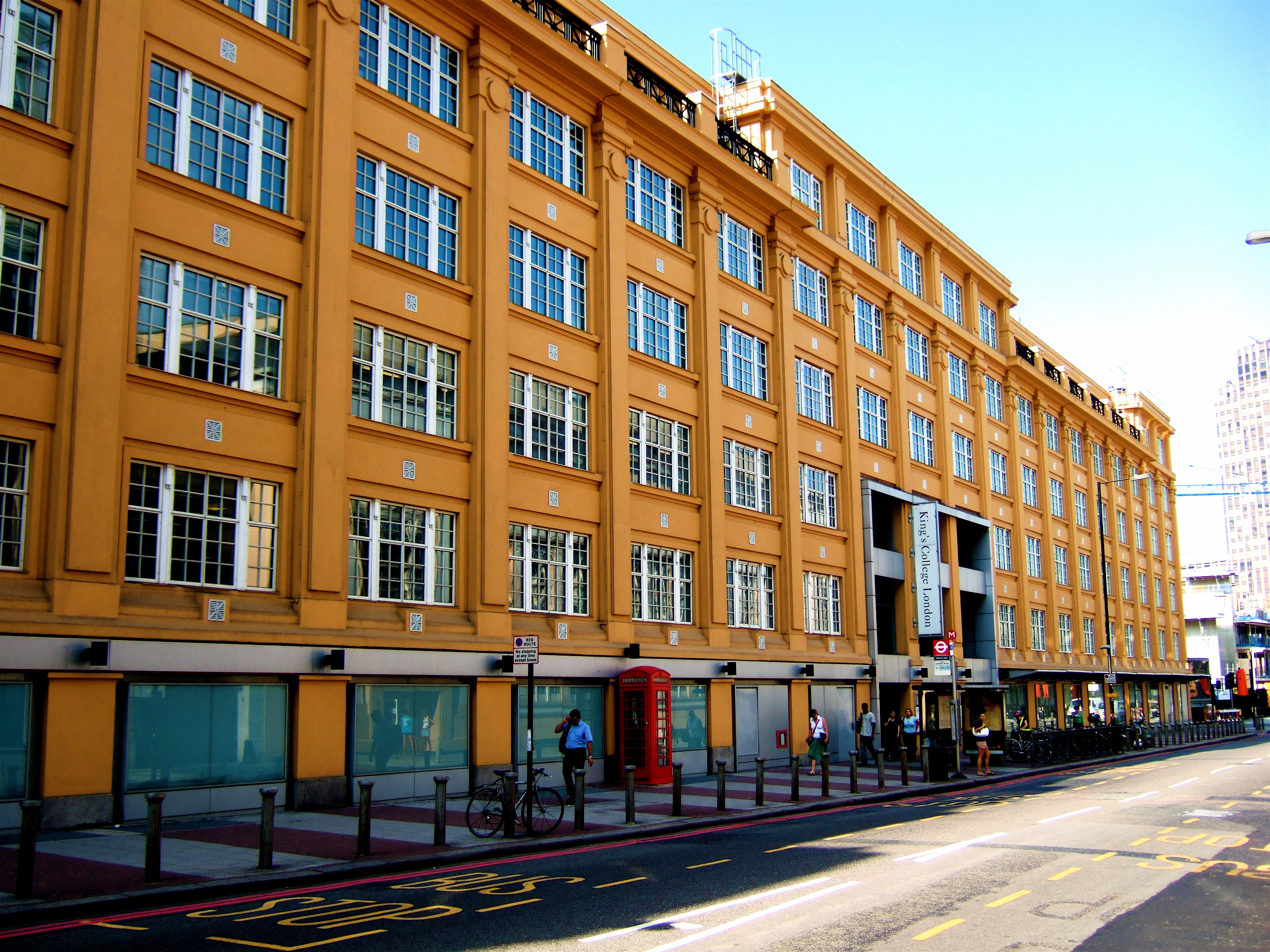
The Florence Nightingale Faculty of Nursing and Midwifery is the oldest nursing school in the UK.

Nurses in the UK qualify and work in one of the four fields of nursing - adult, children, mental health and learning disability. From 2011 students studying a pre-registration nursing programmes in Scotland were required to complete an undergraduate degree. From September 2013 all UK pre-registration nursing programmes are at degree level.

People apply to either an adult, children, mental health or learning disability nursing undergraduate course via university. An undergraduate nursing degree usually takes three years full-time, the NMC requires each student must log over 4,600 combined hours of study and clinical work.

The prequalification requirements are usually five+ GCSEs at grade 4/C or above including English, maths and science; two+ A levels or equivalent level 3 qualifications. For students who already hold a degree in another subject, some universities offer an accelerated course for nursing which is undertaken over two years. It is also possible to complete nurse registration through the nursing degree apprenticeship route, where students are sponsored by their employer.

Learning is divided between academic study and clinical practice - the latter takes place in different care settings depending on the nursing field and on the university's partners; typically a range of hospital services, residential care homes, GP surgeries, hospices, and in patients homes.

Newly qualified Nurses are typically on NHS Agenda for Change (AfC) pay band 5 and progress through bands depending on their career.

=== Tuition fees, loans and bursaries ===
In England student nurses pay tuition fees, which in 2025 were capped at £9,790 per academic year. No bursary is available - these were removed by the then Chancellor, George Osborne, in 2017. Student loans for tuition fees and living costs are available. Student nurses in England can apply for an NHS Learning Support Fund (LSF) which will pay up to £5,000 per academic year.

Student nurses in Wales can apply to the 'NHS Wales Bursary Scheme'. Successful applicants receive funding for tuition fees and a contribution towards living costs. The bursary is open to all eligible home UK students studying an eligible healthcare course in Wales. This is subject to new students committing in advance to work in the NHS in Wales for two years (degree students) or 18 months (diploma students) post-qualification.

Student nurses from Scotland who study in Scotland do not pay tuition fees. They also receive a non-income-assessed bursary of £10,000 per year, with some additional allowances depending on circumstances. Tuition fees are charged to students from outside of Scotland and the bursary is not available to them.

Student nurses in Northern Ireland do not pay tuition fees, provided that they are resident in Northern Ireland for three years prior to the commencement of the course. A bursary is available towards living costs with some additional allowances depending on circumstances.

=== Overseas education ===
The Nursing and Midwifery Council has a specific process for inducting Registered Nurses trained outside the UK. Prior to October 2016 an outside UK RN would have to undergo an Overseas Nursing Program known in short as the ONP. The ONP had to be undertaken by the candidate after NMC makes necessary checks and issue the candidate with a decision letter stating that the person may join a university to undertake the ONP.

However, owing to a shortage of nurses and increasing standards in nursing a new process was introduced to include two part test of competence, including an OSCE (Objective Structured Clinical Examination). The process includes an English language test, the standards of which have been criticised for being too high.

== Post-registration ==
Initial professional development to become competent in areas such as cannulation, intravenous drug therapy, and male catheterisation are common.

To become specialist nurses (such as nurse consultants, nurse practitioners, etc.) or nurse educators, some nurses undertake further training above bachelor's degree level. Master's degrees exist in various healthcare related topics, and some nurses choose to study for PhDs or other higher academic awards. District nurses and health visitors are also considered specialist nurses, and to become such they must undertake specialist training (often in the form of a top-up degree (see above) or post graduate diploma).

All newly qualifying district nurses and health visitors prescribe from the Nurse Prescribers' Formulary, a list of medications and dressings. Many of these (and other) nurses undertake training in independent and supplementary prescribing, which allows them to prescribe most drugs in the British National Formulary. This has been the subject of debate in medical and nursing circles. As of 2012, more than 25,000 Nurse Prescribers had been qualified.

Specialist roles can include clinical nurse specialists, who may run clinics and provide specialist nursing support to wards, or specialist community public health nurses (SCPHNs) such as health visitors. SCPHNs form a separate part of the NMC register.

Advanced nursing practitioners, sometimes known as advanced clinical practitioners, normally study a postgraduate qualification and take on a more medical role. They are the equivalent of nurse practitioners elsewhere. As of 2025, the NMC is consulting on how to effectively regulate

== Nursing associates ==
The NMC Register for Nursing Associates opened in January 2019, for England only. Nursing Associates work across the four fields of nursing in many care settings, bridging the gap between nursing support workers and registered nurses.

The pre-qualification requirements are GCSEs grade 9 to 4 (A to C) in maths and English, or Functional Skills Level 2 in maths and English, with some employers asking for a level 3 qualification. To become a Nursing Associate people apply for an NMC-approved university foundation degree level course, through the Nursing Associate Apprenticeship programme. Nursing Associate Apprenticeships are sometimes advertised via NHS Jobs. The apprenticeship usually takes two years full-time, to fulfill NMC's mandatory 2,300 programme hours. Registration with the NMC gained through application (including references) after the successful completion of the course, and needs to be maintained thereafter.

Nursing Associates are typically on NHS Agenda for Change (AfC) pay band 3 as a student; progressing to band 4 pay once qualified and registered.

Nursing Associates typically work in direct patient care, performing a range of tasks. These may include clinical tasks such as venepuncture or ECGs; clinical observations such as blood pressure or temperature; providing emotional support to individuals; discussing patient information with registered nurses, including a patient's condition, behaviour, activity or responses.

== Support workers ==
Nursing support workers, otherwise known as healthcare assistants (HCAs), clinical support workers, care assistants, or nursing assistants, support a registered nurse in practice. Registration with the NMC is not required and the role is not regulated. However care providers are legally accountable, so support workers must be trained and supervised - usually by a registered nurse.

There is no set qualification entry requirement for this role, though many NHS employers require GCSEs (or equivalent) in English and maths. Most nursing support workers in NHS settings will be required to complete the Care Certificate in the first 12 to 16 weeks of work. Some Nursing Support Worker roles may require an SVQ/NVQ or HNC/HND, often in health care, social care, or health & social care. Applicants typically need to be in a current healthcare role, as these practical courses require workplace assessments. From 2011 the Royal College of Nursing has provided an online training programme for Nursing Support Workers, First Steps.

Nursing Support Workers are typically on NHS Agenda for Change (AfC) pay band 2 and progress to band 3 pay after further training.

Nursing Support Workers typically work in direct patient care, performing a range of tasks. In hospitals and residential care the tasks may include washing and dressing patients, serving meals and helping to feed patients, helping patients move around, helping to monitor patients and performing basic health checks. In a GP surgery or health centre tasks may include taking blood samples, performing health checks, sterilising equipment, restocking supplies, helping with public health information.

=== Cadets ===
Various non-military cadet schemes exist to encourage careers in nursing. Some are paid apprenticeships, tied to vocational qualifications.

The King's Nursing Cadets (the Prince of Wales Nursing Cadets until 2025) programme is a structured work experience programme run by the Royal College of Nursing.
