= Industrial relations =

Study of the relationship between employers, employees and others

Industrial relations or employment relations is the multidisciplinary academic field that studies the employment relationship; that is, the complex interrelations between employers and employees, labor/trade unions, employer organizations, and the state.

The newer name, "Employment Relations" is increasingly taking precedence because "industrial relations" is often seen to have relatively narrow connotations. Nevertheless, industrial relations has frequently been concerned with employment relationships in the broadest sense, including "non-industrial" employment relationships. This is sometimes seen as paralleling a trend in the separate but related discipline of human resource management.

While some scholars regard or treat industrial/employment relations as synonymous with employee relations and labour relations, this is controversial, because of the narrower focus of employee/labour relations, i.e. on employees or labour, from the perspective of employers, managers and/or officials. In addition, employee relations is often perceived as dealing only with non-unionized workers, whereas labour relations is seen as dealing with organized labour, i.e unionized workers. Some academics, universities and other institutions regard human resource management as synonymous with one or more of the above disciplines, although this too is controversial.

== Overview ==
Industrial relations examines various employment situations, not just ones with a unionized workforce. However, according to Bruce E. Kaufman, "To a large degree, most scholars regard trade unionism, collective bargaining and labour–management relations, and the national labour policy and labour law within which they are embedded, as the core subjects of the field."

Initiated in the United States at end of the 19th century, it took off as a field in conjunction with the New Deal. However, it is generally regarded as a separate field of study only in English-speaking countries, having no direct equivalent in continental Europe. In recent times, industrial relations has been in decline as a field, in correlation with the decline in importance of trade unions and also with the increasing preference of business schools for the human resource management paradigm.

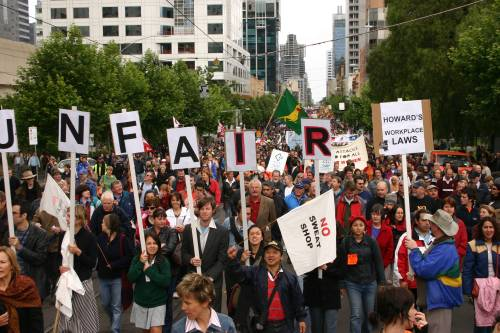
Protest against industrial relations legislation in Melbourne in 2005

Industrial relations has three faces: science building, problem solving, and ethical. In the science building phase, industrial relations is part of the social sciences, and it seeks to understand the employment relationship and its institutions through high-quality, rigorous research. In this vein, industrial relations scholarship intersects with scholarship in labour economics, industrial sociology, labour and social history, human resource management, political science, law, and other areas.

Industrial relations scholarship assumes that labour markets are not perfectly competitive and thus, in contrast to mainstream economic theory, employers typically have greater bargaining power than employees. Industrial relations scholarship also assumes that there are at least some inherent conflicts of interest between employers and employees (for example, higher wages versus higher profits) and thus, in contrast to scholarship in human resource management and organizational behaviour, conflict is seen as a natural part of the employment relationship. Industrial relations scholars therefore frequently study the diverse institutional arrangements that characterize and shape the employment relationship—from norms and power structures on the shop floor, to employee voice mechanisms in the workplace, to collective bargaining arrangements at company, regional, or national level, to various levels of public policy and labour law regimes, to varieties of capitalism (such as corporatism, social democracy, and neoliberalism).

When labour markets are seen as imperfect, and when the employment relationship includes conflicts of interest, then one cannot rely on markets or managers to always serve workers' interests, and in extreme cases to prevent worker exploitation. Industrial relations scholars and practitioners, therefore, support institutional interventions to improve the workings of the employment relationship and to protect workers' rights. The nature of these institutional interventions, however, differ between two camps within industrial relations. The pluralist camp sees the employment relationship as a mixture of shared interests and conflicts of interests that are largely limited to the employment relationship. In the workplace, pluralists, therefore, champion grievance procedures, employee voice mechanisms such as works councils and trade unions, collective bargaining, and labour–management partnerships. In the policy arena, pluralists advocate for minimum wage laws, occupational health and safety standards, international labour standards, and other employment and labour laws and public policies. These institutional interventions are all seen as methods for balancing the employment relationship to generate not only economic efficiency but also employee equity and voice. In contrast, the Marxist-inspired critical camp sees employer–employee conflicts of interest as sharply antagonistic and deeply embedded in the socio-political-economic system. From this perspective, the pursuit of a balanced employment relationship gives too much weight to employers' interests, and instead deep-seated structural reforms are needed to change the sharply antagonistic employment relationship that is inherent within capitalism. Militant trade unions are thus frequently supported.

== History ==
Industrial relations has its roots in the Industrial Revolution which created the modern employment relationship by spawning free labour markets and large-scale industrial organizations with thousands of wage workers. As society wrestled with these massive economic and social changes, labour problems arose. Low wages, long working hours, monotonous and dangerous work, and abusive supervisory practices led to high employee turnover, violent strikes, and the threat of social instability. Intellectually, industrial relations was formed at the end of the 19th century as a middle ground between classical economics and Marxism, with Sidney Webb and Beatrice Webb's Industrial Democracy (1897) being a key intellectual work. Industrial relations thus rejected the classical econ.

Institutionally, industrial relations was founded by John R. Commons when he created the first academic industrial relations program at the University of Wisconsin in 1920. Another scholarly pioneer in industrial relations and labour research was Robert F. Hoxie. Early financial support for the field came from John D. Rockefeller Jr. who supported progressive labour–management relations in the aftermath of the bloody strike at a Rockefeller-owned coal mine in Colorado. In Britain, another progressive industrialist, Montague Burton, endowed chairs in industrial relations at the universities of Leeds, Cardiff, and Cambridge in 1929–1930.

Beginning in the early 1930s there was a rapid increase in membership of trade unions in the United States, and with that came frequent and sometimes violent labour–management conflict. During the Second World War these were suppressed by the arbitration powers of the National War Labor Board.

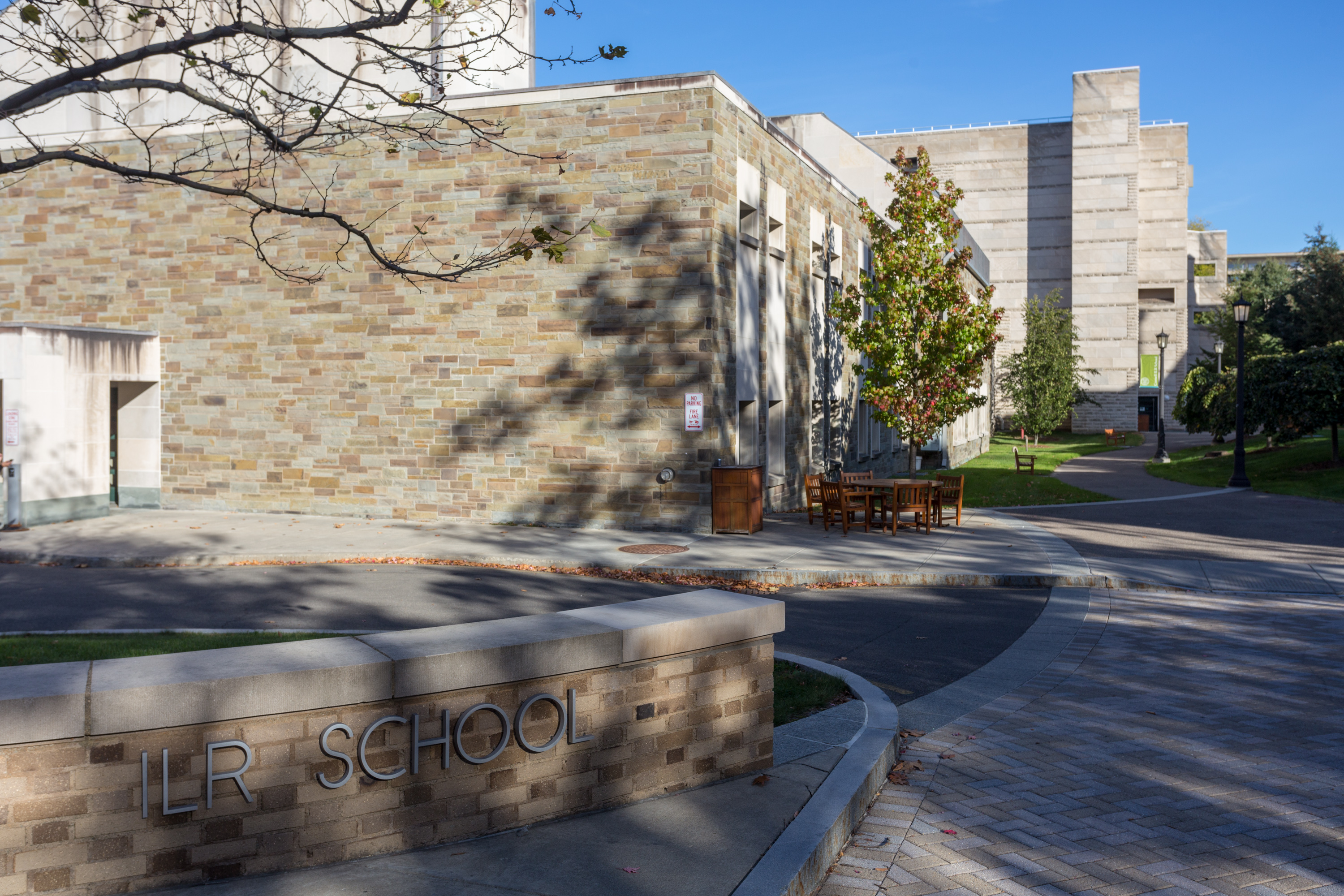
Cornell University School of Industrial and Labor Relations

However, as the Second World War drew to a close and in anticipation of a renewal of labour–management conflict after the war, there was a wave of creations of new academic institutes and degree programs that sought to analyse such conflicts and the role of collective bargaining. The most known of these was the Cornell University School of Industrial and Labor Relations, founded in 1945. But counting various forms, there were over seventy-five others. These included the Yale Labor and Management Center, directed by E. Wight Bakke, which began in 1945. An influential industrial relations scholar in the 1940s and 1950s was Neil W. Chamberlain at Yale and Columbia universities.

In the 1950s, industrial relations was formalized as a distinct academic discipline with the emergence in the UK of the so-called "Oxford school", including Allan Flanders, Hugh Clegg, and Alan Fox, Lord William McCarthy, Sir George Bain (all of whom taught at Nuffield College, Oxford), as well as Otto Kahn-Freund (Brasenose College, Oxford).

Industrial relations was developed with a strong problem-solving orientation that rejected both the classical economists' laissez-faire approach to labour problems and the Marxist solution of class revolution. This approach underlies New Deal legislation in the United States, such as the National Labor Relations Act and the Fair Labor Standards Act.

By the early 21st century, the academic field of industrial relations was often described as being in crisis. In academia, its traditional positions have been challenged on one side by the dominance of mainstream economics and organizational behavior, and on the other by postmodernism.

In policy-making circles, the industrial relations emphasis on institutional intervention is trumped by a neoliberal emphasis on the laissez-faire promotion of free markets. In practice, trade unions are declining and fewer companies have industrial relations functions. The number of academic programs in industrial relations is therefore shrinking, while fields such as human resource management and organizational behaviour grow. The importance of this work, however, is stronger than ever, and the lessons of industrial relations remain vital. The challenge for industrial relations is to re-establish these connections with the broader academic, policy, and business worlds.

== Theoretical perspectives ==
Industrial relations scholars such as Alan Fox have described three major theoretical perspectives or frameworks, that contrast in their understanding and analysis of workplace relations. The three views are generally known as unitarism, pluralism, and the radical or critical school. Each offers a particular perception of workplace relations and will, therefore, interpret such events as workplace conflict, the role of unions and job regulation differently. The perspective of the critical school is sometimes referred to as the conflict model, although this is somewhat ambiguous, as pluralism also tends to see conflict as inherent in workplaces. Radical theories are strongly identified with Marxist theories, although they are not limited to these.

=== Pluralist perspective ===
In pluralism, the organization is perceived as being made up of powerful and divergent sub-groups, each with its own legitimate interests and loyalties and with their own set of objectives and leaders. In particular, the two predominant sub-groups in the pluralist perspective are the management and trade unions. The pluralist perspective also supports that conflict is inherent in dealing with industrial relations since different sub-groups have different opinions in the day-to-day operations. Consequently, the role of management would lean less towards enforcing and controlling and more toward persuasion and coordination. Trade unions are deemed legitimate representatives of employees, conflict is resolved through collective bargaining and is viewed not necessarily as a bad thing and, if managed, could, in fact, be channeled towards evolution and positive change.

=== Unitarist perspective ===
In unitarism, the organization is perceived as an integrated and harmonious whole with the idea of "one happy family" in which management and other members of the staff all share a common purpose by emphasizing mutual co-operation. Furthermore, unitarism has a paternalistic approach: it demands loyalty of all employees and is managerial in its emphasis and application. Consequently, trade unions are deemed unnecessary since the loyalty between employees and organizations are considered mutually exclusive, and there cannot be two sides of industry. Conflict is perceived as destructive and the result of poor management.

=== Radical or critical perspective ===
This view of industrial relations looks at the nature of the capitalist society, where there is a fundamental division of interest between capital and labour, and sees workplace relations against this background. This perspective sees inequalities of power and economic wealth as having their roots in the nature of the capitalist economic system. Conflict is therefore seen as a natural outcome of capitalism, thus it is inevitable and trade unions are a natural response of workers to their exploitation by capital. Whilst there may be periods of acquiescence, the Marxist view would be that institutions of joint regulation would enhance rather than limit management's position as they presume the continuation of capitalism rather than challenge it.

== Labor relations ==
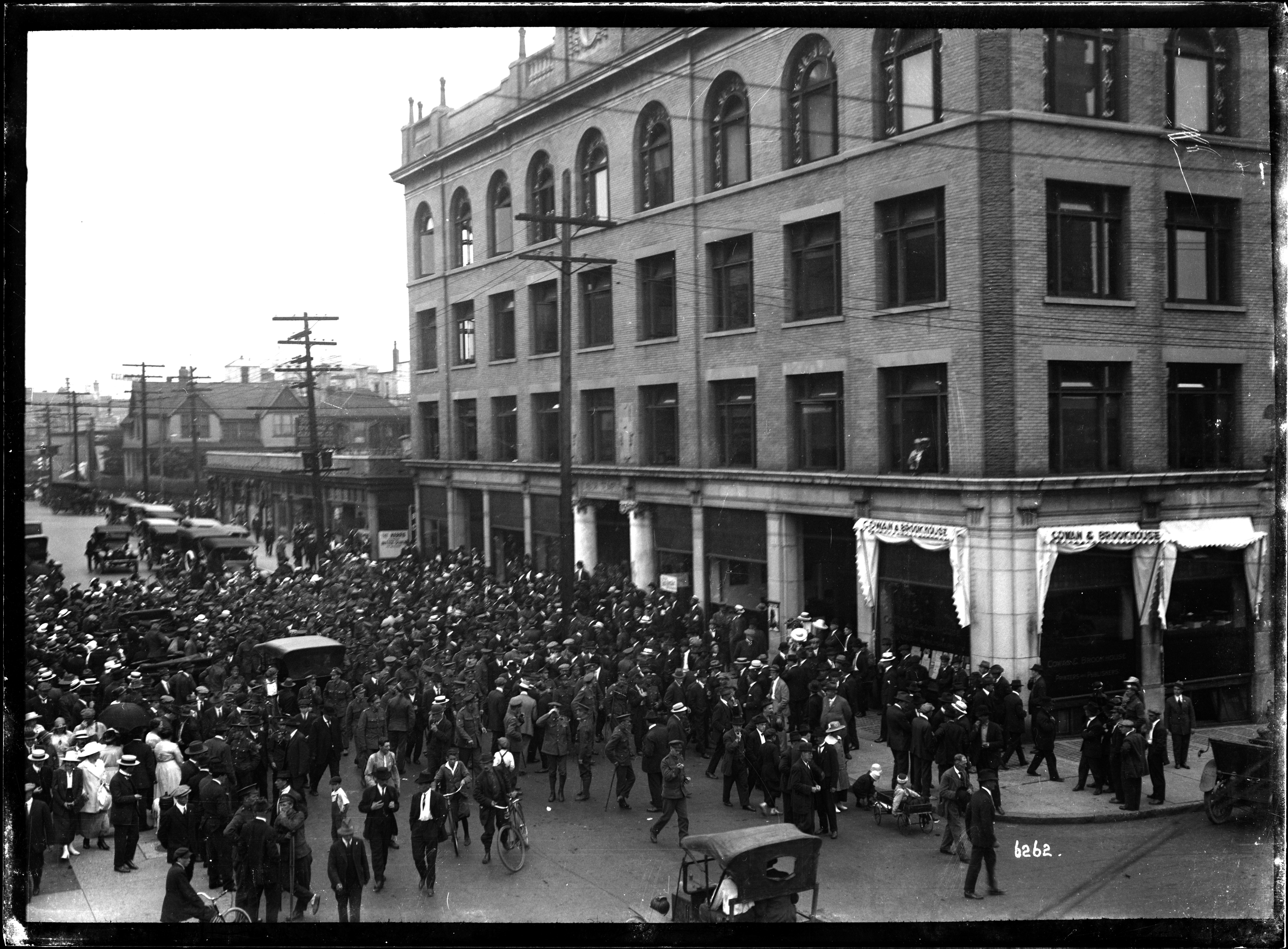
Vancouver Labour Temple during the general strike in 1918

Labor relations or labor studies is a field of study that can have different meanings depending on the context in which it is used. In an international context, it is a subfield of labor history that studies the human relations with regard to work in its broadest sense and how this connects to questions of social inequality. It explicitly encompasses unregulated, historical, and non-Western forms of labor. Here, labor relations define "for or with whom one works and under what rules. These rules (implicit or explicit, written or unwritten) determine the type of work, type and amount of remuneration, working hours, degrees of physical and psychological strain, as well as the degree of freedom and autonomy associated with the work." More specifically in a North American and strictly modern context, labor relations is the study and practice of managing unionized employment situations. In academia, labor relations is frequently a sub-area within industrial relations, though scholars from many disciplines including economics, sociology, history, law, and political science also study labor unions and labor movements. In practice, labor relations is frequently a subarea within human resource management. Courses in labor relations typically cover labor history, labor law, union organizing, bargaining, contract administration, and important contemporary topics.

In the United States, labor relations in most of the private sector is regulated by the National Labor Relations Act. Labor relations in the railroad and airline industries are regulated by the Railway Labor Act. Public sector labor relations is regulated by the Civil Service Reform Act of 1978 and various pieces of state legislation. In other countries, labor relations might be regulated by law or tradition. An important professional association for United States labor relations scholars and practitioners is the Labor and Employment Relations Association.
