= Rita Hinden =

South African social democratic activist

- Born: Rebecca Gesundheit; December 16, 1901 Cape Town, South Africa
- Died: November 18, 1971 London, England
- Occupation: List: Journalist; Political activist; Author
- Citizenship: South African
- Subject: List: Social democracy; Anti-Colonialism

Rita Hinden (16 December 1909 – 18 November 1971), born Rebecca Gesundheit in Cape Town, Cape Colony, was a South African-born British journalist, socialist activist, and campaigner on colonial issues. She is best remembered for founding and serving as the first secretary of the Fabian Colonial Bureau, through which she played a significant role in shaping Labour Party colonial policy during and after the Second World War.

Hinden studied economics at the London School of Economics, where she later earned her doctorate in 1939. After a period in Palestine, she and her husband settled permanently in London in 1938. She joined the Labour Party and the Fabian Society the following year, and soon after co-founded the Fabian Colonial Bureau alongside Arthur Creech Jones. Her early output at the bureau included Plan for Africa (1942) and the edited volume Fabian Colonial Essays (1945), both of which helped define Fabian and Labour approaches to colonial development. After stepping down from the bureau in 1950, she took on the editorship of Socialist Commentary, in which she championed revisionist social democracy and the intellectual legacy of the English Christian socialist R. H. Tawney. She was also a key intellectual at the anti-Communist Congress for Cultural Freedom in the 1950s.

== Early life ==
Born near Cape Town as Rebecca Gesundheit, she was always known as "Rita". When she was three years old, her family's ostrich farm failed, and they moved into Cape Town itself. There, she attended the Seminary of Good Hope, while being educated in Jewish culture and faith by her father. She attended the University of Cape Town for a year, then her family migrated to Palestine, the first South African Jews to do so. However, there was no opportunity for her to study in Palestine, so she moved to England, where she attended the University of Liverpool for a further year, and then the London School of Economics (LSE).

== Career ==
In London, she met Elchon Hinden, a medical graduate, and the two married in February 1933. Although they briefly moved back to Palestine, they soon returned to London so Elchon could undertake further study, and the couple became active in the Independent Labour Party. Rita also continued to study, working on a doctorate at the LSE under David Horowitz. The couple moved to Palestine again in 1935, where they became active in the Labour Zionist movement, but became disillusioned with the rising nationalism and also Elchon's difficulties in finding suitable employment. In 1938, they finally settled in England, and gradually became agnostic, although they remained involved in a variety of Jewish organisations.

Rita joined the Labour Party and the Fabian Society. She obtained her doctorate in 1939 and, on the advice of R. R. Kuczynski, she founded the Fabian Colonial Bureau to research and campaign on anti-colonialism. She became the bureau's first secretary, and worked closely with Arthur Creech Jones, its first chair. They produced numerous pamphlets, and Hinden's own book, Plan for Africa. Although she stood down as secretary in 1950, she continued to write for it, while also serving on a variety of government committees. She became the secretary of the Socialist Union and editor of Socialist Commentary, bodies associated with the Labour Party and particularly with Hugh Gaitskell.

== Personal life ==
She had two children, Jonathan Hinden (1938-2021) who married Jackie Froom and Naomi (Judith) Gair. (1935-living.)

She died of a second stroke on 18 November 1971, at Whipps Cross Hospital, London, and was cremated at Golders Green crematorium. Memorial lectures were given in her honour until 1974, and revived again in 2025, with the first being given by Labour MP Anneliese Dodds in September 2025.

== Bibliography ==
=== As author ===
- Hinden, Rita (1941). Plan for Africa: A Report Prepared for the Colonial Bureau of the Fabian Society. London: Fabian Publications.
- Hinden, Rita (1942). Freedom for Colonial Peoples. London: National Peace Council. (Peace Aims Pamphlet, no. 11; with A. Creech Jones, Norman Bentwich, W. Arthur Lewis, and Robert Adams.)
- Hinden, Rita (1943). The Colonies and Us. London: Fabian Publications.
- Hinden, Rita (1946). The Labour Party and the Colonies. London: Fabian Publications.
- Hinden, Rita (1946). Socialists and the Empire: Five Years' Work of the Fabian Colonial Bureau. London: Fabian Publications.
- Hinden, Rita (1949). Empire and After: A Study of British Imperial Attitudes. London: Fabian Publications.
- Hinden, Rita (1949). Common Sense and Colonial Development. London: Fabian Publications / Victor Gollancz.
- Hinden, Rita (1950). Local Government and the Colonies: A Report to the Fabian Colonial Bureau. London: Fabian Publications.
- Hinden, Rita (1951). A World of Peace and Plenty. London: Fabian Publications.
- Hinden, Rita (1958). No Cheer for Central Africa. London: Fabian Publications.
- Hinden, Rita (1961). Principles of Socialism: Africa and Asia. London: Fabian Publications.
- Hinden, Rita (1962). Africa and Democracy. London: The Africa Bureau. (Encounter Pamphlet, no. 8.)

=== As contributor ===
- Abrams, Mark; Rose, Richard; Hinden, Rita (1960). Must Labour Lose?. Harmondsworth: Penguin. (Hinden contributed the commentary.)

=== As editor ===
- Hinden, Rita, ed. (1945). Fabian Colonial Essays. London: Fabian Publications.
- Tawney, R. H. (1964). The Radical Tradition: Twelve Essays on Politics, Education and Literature. Edited by Rita Hinden. London: Minerva Press.

Media offices
Preceded by Mary Saran	Editor of Socialist Commentary; 1950–1971; With: Mary Saran (1950–1955)	Succeeded by Peter Stephenson
Party political offices
Preceded by New position	Secretary of the Fabian Colonial Bureau; 1940–1950	Succeeded by Marjorie Nicholson
