= Johannes Kriege =

German jurist and politician (1859–1937)

Johannes Kriege (22 July 1859 – 28 May 1937) was a German jurist, lawyer, diplomat and politician.

== Early life ==
Johannes Daniel Jakob Kriege was born in Lüdinghausen, a midsized town then in Prussia's Province of Westphalia, located between Münster to its northeast and Dortmund to its south. In 1877, he began to study jurisprudence at Göttingen and Strasburg. He passed his stage one state law exams and obtaining a post in the Prussian legal service as a court clerk in 1880 and received his doctorate of law in 1881. That year, he passed his second level state law exams. He entered the Prussian diplomatic service in 1886.

== Diplomat ==
In 1887, he received his first diplomatic posting and was appointed as the German acting vice-consul in Amsterdam, which may have been when he first got to know Pieter Cort van der Linden, who would become the Dutch prime minister during the First World War during which Kriege described him as having long a personal friend.

Kriege's next appointment, between 1889 and 1894, was as consul in Asunción, where his son Walter was born. Kriege returned to Europe in 1896 and received the same function in Sarajevo. During the years that followed, he held an increasingly-senior succession of legal posts in the foreign ministry. In 1900, he was appointed to the Privy Legation Council (Legationsrat).

During the early 20th century, Kriege participated in several of the important conferences that reflected growing international tensions across Europe. He attended the Second Hague Peace Conference and was a permanent member of the Hague Court from 1906 and his death. In 1908 to 1909, he represented Germany at the London Law of the Sea Conference.

Between September 1911 and November 1917, Kriege served as head undersecretary (Ministerialdirektor) at the legal department of the foreign ministry. In 1916, he joined the privy council. On 31 January 1917, he held a secret meeting in Amsterdam with his old friend van der Linden, the Dutch prime minister, and explained the background to the still-secret German government decision to resume its controversial submarine campaign against the British and their allies. The Dutch government was assured that the German side continued to value good commercial relations with the Netherlands but was also warned of the dire consequences if it succumbed to Anglo-American pressure to enter the war against Germany.

The Dutch remained neutral in the war even after February 1917, when diplomatic relations reached a new low after German submarines had sunk seven Dutch ships, which were presumably engaged in commerce involving British ports. The Dutch delayed handing over two German submarines that had been badly damaged but not sunk in Dutch waters. Diplomatic waters were calmed by a further meeting between Kriege and van der Linden.

Before and during the war, he continued to be a member of German delegations at international conferences. Notably in 1918, he was the German government's chief negotiator in the negotiations that led to the Treaty of Brest-Litovsk, which formally excluded Russia from participation in the alliance against Germany. The war ended in a defeat for Germany that was followed by a year of revolution. Kriege went into temporary retirement but was formally retired from the diplomatic service only in 1924.

One result of the military defeat and the ensuring revolution was that Emperor Wilhelm II abdicated and was sent into exile at Doorn, a short drive west of Utrecht. During this period Kriege made frequent visits to Huis Doorn where he served as legal advisor to Wilhelm.

== Parliamentarian ==
In the Weimar Republic, Kriege between 1921 and 1932 was a member of the Landtag of Prussia in which he represented the conservative German National People's Party (Deutschnationale Volkspartei).

== Family ==
Kriege came from a large well-connected family. His eldest son, Walter Kriege (1891-1952), also became a high-placed government lawyer and played a political role during the early years of the German Federal Republic. As a result of Walter's marriage, Johannes Kriege became the brother-in-law of the architect Richard Saran and the grandfather of the political journalist Mary Saran. He was also a nephew to the high-profile theologian-pastor Otto Funcke (1836-1910) and a grandson to the Bremen city mayor, Johann Daniel Meier (1804-1871). A cousin was the early socialist Hermann Kriege (1820-1850).
