= Standing Commission on Pay Comparability =

The Standing Commission on Pay Comparability was set up by the government of Prime Minister James Callaghan in the United Kingdom to provide recommendations on fixing pay and conditions in the public sector, so as to reduce the possibilities of strike actions and in pursuit of the government's incomes policy, following the 'Winter of Discontent' industrial actions of 1978/9.

Callaghan announced the Commission in a statement to the House of Commons on 7 March 1979.

In my speech to the House on 16 January I commented on the present method of fixing pay and conditions in some areas of the public services and expressed the Government's readiness to see a greater role for measuring their pay and conditions by making comparisons with pay for comparable work and effort in other occupations where both sides so requested.

This suggestion was carried further in the recent joint Government-TUC statement as a means of averting strike action in areas which affect public health and safety, and we undertook to identify groups which might be covered by such agreements.

The Government have a responsibility both to be fair to public service employees and to avoid arrangements which could in themselves prove inflationary. Comparability studies must therefore be made in a systematic and thorough manner, taking all relevant factors into account.

The Chairman of the Commission was Professor Hugh Clegg, and it was therefore often referred to as the "Clegg Commission". The Commission was disbanded by the incoming government of Margaret Thatcher. She complained to Clegg in May 1979 that the Commission did not take into account questions of efficiency and overmanning, and felt that the Commission effectively placed inflationary pressures on the government wage-bill. The Commission was abolished in 1980.
