= Carolyn Krieg =

American artist (born 1953)

Carolyn Krieg (born 1953) is an American mixed-media artist known for her works based in photography.

Her work is included in the collections of the Seattle Art Museum, the Northwest Museum of Arts & Culture and the Museum of Contemporary Photography.
