= Hugh Clegg (academic) =

British academic (1920–1995)

Hugh Armstrong Clegg (22 May 1920 – 9 December 1995) was a British academic who was a founder of the "National Board for Prices and Incomes" (1965–71) and later presided over the "Standing Commission on Pay Comparability" set up by James Callaghan in 1979.

Clegg was born in Truro. Educated at the Methodist Kingswood School, he rebelled by becoming a Communist for a period in his youth, but gained a scholarship to study Classics at Magdalen College, Oxford University; he then served for five years in the army during the Second World War. After returning to Oxford, where he gained a first class degree in PPE in 1947, he was persuaded by G. D. H. Cole to take up the study of industrial relations. He became a fellow of Nuffield College in 1949.

In 1965 he was appointed to the "Royal commission on Trade Unions and Employers' Associations" (also known as the "Donovan Commission") set up by the Labour government under Harold Wilson to seek solutions to the problem of strikes which plagued the British economy of the period. Clegg successfully argued in the Commission that strikes were caused by poor industrial management, not by unions, effectively derailing Barbara Castle's white paper, In Place of Strife, which sought to establish legislative intervention in major disputes, and which the Commission had originally supported. He also became a member of the "National Board for Prices and Incomes" set up in 1965 to regulate a prices and incomes policy, but the intractable circumstances of labour relations in Britain meant that this initiative remained a "damp squib". The Board was wound down in 1971 and Clegg wrote a book on his experience entitled How to Run an Incomes Policy, and Why We Made Such a Mess of the Last One.

From 1967 to 1979 Clegg was Professor of Industrial Relations at Warwick University (the first to hold this appointment), and took part in the launch of Warwick Business School, where he founded the Industrial Relations Research Unit in 1970. In 1979 James Callaghan requested Clegg to chair the "Standing Commission on Pay Comparability" with which it was hoped to tackle the public service disputes of the sort which had led to the 'Winter of Discontent' of 1978–9. The Commission was disbanded by the incoming government of Margaret Thatcher, who blamed it for over-inflating the government wage bill.

Clegg wrote numerous studies, including a three-volume History of British Trade Unions (published between 1964 and 1994). His book The System of Industrial Relations in Great Britain (1953, revised 1970 and 1979) was regarded as a major text on the topic. He died in Warwick in 1995 of a stroke.
