= Walter Kriege =

German jurist (1891–1952)

- Born: Walter Adolf Florens Hermann Kriege; 15 March 1891; Asunción, Paraguay
- Died: 1 December 1952 (aged 61); Düsseldorf, West Germany
- Occupations: Lawyer; Politician; Banker
- Spouse: Hilde Saran
- Children: 1s, 1d

Walter Kriege (15 March 1891 – 1 December 1952) was a German jurist who also had a political role in the 1940s.

== Life ==
Walter Adolf Florens Hermann Kriege was born in Paraguay in 1891. His father, Johannes Kriege (1859–1937), was a German diplomat who in the early 1890s worked as the German Consul in Asunción.

After taking part in the First World War, Kriege completed his studies in jurisprudence at Berlin, where he obtained his doctorate. Between 1921 and 1923, he worked at the Reichsbank, the German Central Bank. Between 1923 and 1944, he worked in the Prussian Justice Ministry and later transferred to the national State Justice Ministry. In April 1940, he was appointed Ministerial Director in the Justice Ministry, a post that he retained until his arrest in July 1944. It subsequently emerged that a year after his appointment, on 23/24 April 1941, Kriege was one of several high-profile government lawyers called to a special meeting at Hermann Göring's palatial offices in Berlin at which the participants were informed about Nazi Germany's new and subsequently-controversial Action T4 policy of enforced euthanasia. Between 1939 and 1944, Kriege also served as the president of the Senior Maritime Trophies Court (Oberprisenhof).

He was nominated a member Carl Friedrich Goerdeler'splanned Shadow Cabinet as Secretary of State at the Justice Ministry or, according to another source, as Justice Minister. However, the planned government never came to power because the 20 July plot failed to assassinate Adolf Hitler, Germany's incumbent chancellor. Instead, Kriege was arrested, but unlike many others who were then arrested, he was released a few months later, in November 1944.

The Second World War ended in May 1945 and what remained of Germany was divided into four occupation zones, each of which administered by one of the four principal victorious Allied poweres. In May 1949, three of the four occupation zones were refounded as West Germany. Between 1946 and 1949, Kriege worked as deputy president of the "German Finance Council", in the US occupation zone at Stuttgart. He also held the directorship of the "Finance Administration Office" ("Verwaltung für Finanzen"), which in 1949 became the West German Finance Ministry. The new country's chancellor, Konrad Adenauer, was keen to appoint Kriege as his Administrative Secretary of State for Foreign Affairs.

The post was particularly ambiguous because West Germany has been established under terms established by the country's sponsors in the so-called Occupation statute of April 1949, which greatly qualified the new country's autonomy and expressly excluded foreign policy from the Adenauer government's areas of responsibility. In the event, neither Kriege nor Paulus van Husen, to whom the post was offered, accepted it. For the early years of his chancellorship, Adenauer ran his Foreign Ministry himself.

Kriege himself took a bank directorship, probably before he had been formally offered the foreign ministry post, as president of the "Land Bank" (Landeszentralbank) of North Rhine-Westphalia, a post that he retained until he died just over two years later.

Kriege was the nephew of the architect Richard Saran, the grandson of Bremen Mayor John Daniel Meier and the cousin of the journalist Mary Saran. He was also a relative of the early socialist Hermann Kriege.
