= Susanne Miller =

German author and historian (1915–2008)

- Born: Susanne Strasser; 14 May 1915; Sofia, Bulgaria
- Died: 1 July 2008 (aged 93); Bonn, Germany
- Occupations: Political activist Historian
- Spouse(s): 1. Horace Miller; 2. Willi Eichler
- Parent(s): Ernst Strasser; Margit Rodosi/Strasser

Susanne Miller (born Susanne Strasser: 14 May 1915 – 1 July 2008) was a Bulgarian-born left wing activist who for reasons of race and politics spent her early adulthood as a refugee in England. After 1945, she became known in West Germany as a historian.

== Life ==
=== Early years ===
Susanne Miller was born in Sofia in May 1915, less than a year after the outbreak of the First World War. Her family, originally of Jewish provenance, was prosperous and conservative. Her father, Ernst Strasser, was a banker: her mother, Margarete/Margit Strasser (born Rodosi), gave birth to the Strassers' second child, Georgina, approximately twenty months after Susanne's birth. In 1919, however, the girls' mother died as a result of the 1918/20 influenza pandemic. When she was five Susanne was baptised as a Protestant, but her father's motives in arranging this seem to have been more social than religious.

Around 1920/21 Ernst Strasser married again. By his new wife, born Irene Freund, Susanne and Georgina quickly acquired two more half-siblings, Erika and Edgar. The family also relocated: between 1921 and 1929 they lived in Döbling, on the northwest side of Vienna. Susanne later recorded that it was here, while still a child living in one of the city's most affluent quarters, that she became aware of the huge social inequalities in the Austrian capital. At home she was acutely aware of the way her conservative family was distanced from the servants they employed.

After starting off at the local primary school, her secondary education took her to a co-educational secondary school (Bundesgymnasium) where her academic enthusiasms became particularly focused on history and so-called "Golden Age" historiography. In 1929 the family moved back to Bulgaria in connection with Ernst Strasser's work, and Susanne Strasser switched to the German School (Gymnasium) in Sofia. By this time she was already becoming interested in socialist politics. It was in Sofia, still aged only 17, that Susanne Strasser passed her School Certificate (Matriculation / Abitur) exam.

=== Socialist influences and early activism ===
Taking inspiration from Zeko Torbov, the philosophy teacher at the German School in Sofia, and from discussions with Edith Wagner, a cousin two years older than she was, Strasser began to research Socialist philosophy for herself. At the centre of her investigations was Leonard Nelson, the charismatic philosopher and mastermind of the International Association of Socialist Struggle ("Internationaler Sozialistischer Kampfbund" / ISK), which he founded in 1926. Nelson was heavily influenced by neo-Kantianism. His socialism was based not so much on the historical materialism of Karl Marx, as on simple ethical motivation. She became a member of the ISK.

During a two-week trip to Berlin at the end of 1932 Susanne Strasser made a point of getting in touch with local ISK members. One of the people she met was Willi Eichler whom much later she would marry. Others she met at that time included Gustav Heckmann and Helmut von Rauschenplat (better known to posterity by the name he later used, Fritz Eberhard). On her return to Vienna she did not immediately return to her studies, but took several weeks out to volunteer for social and welfare work. It was at this time that she became familiar with living conditions in the city's working class quarters, such as Favoriten, Ottakring and Floridsdorf.

She moved on to the University of Vienna, studying historiography (geschichtswissenschaft), English studies (Anglistik) and philosophy. Her student studies were influenced, in particular, by two of her tutors, the theoretical Marxist philosopher Max Adler and the philosopher Heinrich Gomperz. She joined the Socialist Students' Association, which few students in Vienna did during the early 1930s. Later she wrote that anti-semitic currents with in the association dissuaded her from ever being an active member of it, however.

A defining episode for Strasser was the Austrian February uprising in 1934. Violent confrontation between what she would have identified as the Austrofascist government under Engelbert Dollfuss and the Social Democratic Workers' Party lasted for three days in Vienna, where it ended in defeat for the Social Democrats. Her assessment in 1995 would be that these events had "turned Austria into a fascist country - although without the extreme racism of the German Nazis". After the fighting ended Strasser was one of those involved in distribution of donations received from Great Britain and the United States to working class Viennese families who had fallen into penury through loss of family income caused by the death, injury or detention of the family wage earner. Through her aid distribution work she got to know Josef Afritsch, who two and a half decades later became the Austrian Interior minister, and Alma Seitz, the wife of a well-remembered former Socialist Mayor of Vienna.

=== England ===
In the summer of 1934, Susan Strasser went to England where she worked as an au pair, not for a family but with a charitable institution run in East London by the Methodist Church, and known as the Bermondsey Settlement. She made two further summer visits to London during the 1930s. In London she met people who were in contact with the ISK, of which Strasser was still a member. These included Jenny and Walter Fliess, Jewish refugees originally from Magdeburg, ISK members who were running a vegetarian restaurant in the City of London, in order to use the profits from their business to help fund German resistance against Nazism. Susanne Strasser's third summer visit to London took place in the summer of 1938. On this occasion she worked in the restaurant of her friends Jenny and Walter Fliess. 1938 was also the year of the so-called Anschluss, by which Austria became part of an enlarged Nazi German state. Susanne Strasser stayed in England.

Susanne Strasser became Susanne Miller and acquired a British passport in 1939 by means of a "pro forma" marriage to a Labour activist. Young Horace Miller was also the boyfriend of Renate Saran, a fellow refugee from Nazi Germany and the daughter of Susanne's ISK comrade and friend Mary Saran, but Renate when reporting the matter later, made light of this. In the summer of 1939, there was a widespread fear, especially among the growing refugee community in London, that during the coming war German armies would simply roll across Europe "without meeting any effective resistance". A German name would draw attention to her German provenance, while any follow-up investigation by the authorities following a Nazi occupation of Britain would quickly uncover her political activism and Jewish ancestry. Susanne Strasser married Horace Milton Sydney Miller in London's Paddington quarter on 25 September 1939. Mrs.Miller spent the Second World War in London. Some of the normally public records of her activities during that time have still not been disclosed by the British authorities.

Miller became a member of London's community of socialist exiles from Germany. Others included Willi Eichler who arrived in London from Paris shortly before the outbreak of war. The ISK chairperson Minna Specht also lived and worked in London during the war years. except during the period when she was officially identified as an enemy alien and interned on the Isle of Man. Another of the ISK leaders in London was Maria Hodan. Miller herself presented a series of lectures to women from the English Cooperative Movement and from the National Council of Labour. The lectures generally concerned events on the European mainland, and in particular in Nazi Germany. In 1944 she stopped working in her friends' vegetarian restaurant in order to work full-time, together with Willi Eichler, on political matters. Fears of a German invasion of England had receded after the Battle of Britain 1940: the political work that preoccupied Eichler and Miller included drafting policy papers and speeches for a postwar Germany.

During Miller's London exile she was also able to meet up with members of Jewish organisations such as the Bundists, and through them members of the General Jewish Labour League from central and eastern Europe. One of the most memorable encounters was with Szmul Zygielbojm who in 1940 had vehemently opposed the establishment of the Warsaw Ghetto, and who subsequently became a member of the London-based Polish government-in-exile. Motivated by these meetings, Susanne Miller would later produce several publications of her own about the Bundists. She was particularly moved by the murders by the Soviets in 1942 and 1943 of Victor Alter and Henryk Ehrlich. In the 1990s she backed Feliks Tych with his construction of a reading room in the Warsaw Institute for the History of Jews in Poland, placing on the wall there a memorial to the two murdered Bundists on behalf of herself and her (by now long since dead) husband.

=== Germany ===
War ended in May 1945, and Susanne Miller accompanied Willi Eichler back to what remained of Germany, settling initially in Cologne which was in the country's British occupation zone, and where Eichler was appointed editor in chief of the revived Rheinische Zeitung (newspaper). She and Horace Miller were formally divorced in July 1946. In April 1946 she joined Germany's Social Democratic Party (SPD) which following the defeat of Nazi Germany was no longer an illegal organisation. The ISK had lost its purpose with the military defeat of Nazism, and formally dissolved itself in December 1945. Most of the socialist activists with whom Miller had shared her London exile now, like her, joined the SPD.

1946 marked the start of a period of intensive political activity. While Willi Eichler quickly rose up the SPD hierarchy nationally, becoming one of the party's top strategists, Susanne was elected to the leadership of her district party association in Cologne-South. Shortly after this she became Chair of the SPD Women's Group for the Middle Rhine region. It was in this capacity that in 1950 she organised party training events for women during the 1950s. Some of the events she organised focused on equivalent Social Democratic activities in neighbouring countries, Belgium, Luxemburg and the Netherlands. Nationally she became a member of the party Women's Committee in 1948. During this time she was working with other leading SPD politicians such as Herta Gotthelf, Elisabeth Selbert, Luise Albertz, Annemarie Renger and Louise Schroeder.

Her activities in Social Democratic Party education work included participation in setting up and running the Socialist Education Association (Sozialistischen Bildungsgemeinschaft ) in Cologne, in which she worked alongside Eichler as well as the polymath-sociologist Gerhard Weisser, the future regional prime minister Heinz Kühn and Kuhn's wife Marianne. She was responsible, together with Marianne Kühn, for planning the lecture programme: those accepting invitations to address the Socialist Education Association included Wolfgang Leonhard und Heinrich Böll. In addition, Susanne Miller was one of those involved in recreating in Bonn the Philosophical-Political Academy, which re-emerged in 1949 after a sixteen-year hiatus. The Academy, of which Susanne Miller served as president between 1982 and 1990, continued to promote the political philosophical insights of Leonard Nelson long after Nelson's death in 1927.

In 1951 Susanne Miller and Willi Eichler relocated a short distance upriver from Cologne to Bonn. In May 1949 three of the four postwar military occupation zones of Germany had been merged and relaunched as the German Federal Republic (West Germany), a US sponsored new kind of Germany, politically and increasingly physically separated from what in May 1949 was still administered as the Soviet occupation zone, surrounding Berlin. Bonn had become the de facto capital of the new West German state. Eichler had become a salaried member of the SPD leadership, located in Bonn. Shortly after the two of them moved to Bonn Miller was also appointed to a salaried position with the party. After the 1953 General Election, in which the SPD lost badly, Eichler chaired the party commission charged with drawing up a new programme for the party. Susanne Miller was an exceptionally close observer of the process that ensued because she attended the commission meetings and took the minutes. The result of the commission's deliberations was finally presented in 1959 as the Godesberg Program. It marked a dramatic change of direction for the Social Democrats, away from Marxist dogmatism and towards a pragmatic welcoming of the need to collaborate with market-economy capitalism on behalf of the people. In later decades Susanne Miller would herself publish some authoritative historical works on the Godesberg Program.

=== Back to college ===
Once work had been completed on the Godesberg Program, Susanne Miller decided to return to the studies that she had abandoned as an eighteen year old in 1934. In 1960 she enrolled at the Frederick-William University of Bonn to study Historiography (Geschichtswissenschaft), Political Science and Pedagogy. After about two and a half years she began work on her doctoral dissertation, for which she was supervised, like many others over the years, by Karl Dietrich Bracher. She received her doctorate in 1963 for a piece of work, which was subsequently adapted and published as a book, on the development of the Party Programmes for Social Democracy in Germany during the second half of the nineteenth century. In this study she analysed the evolution of a Social Democratic party programme, starting with Ferdinand Lassalle's General German Workers' Association (Allgemeiner Deutscher Arbeiter-Verein / ADV) of 1863, and tracking through to Eduard Bernstein and the Revisionist Struggles of the 1890s. She dedicated this work to her friend, Minna Specht.

=== The qualified historian ===
Miller's initial plan following qualification was to work in the library of the SPD Party Executive. That plan was not implemented, however. Nor did she accept an offer to work at the International Textbook Research Institute at Braunschweig. Instead she remained in Bonn, and in 1964 took a position with the "Commission for the History of Parliamentarism and of Political Parties" ("Kommission für Geschichte des Parlamentarismus und der politischen Parteien"). She worked at this non-university research institute right through till 1978. Initially she worked with "source works". One of these was the war-diary of the SPD Reichstag deputy Eduard David. Her next project at the institute was a source volume on the 1918/1919 Council of the People's Deputies. Her study of the development of the Social Democratic Party memorably entitled "Civil Peace and Class War" ("Burgfrieden und Klassenkampf. Die deutsche Sozialdemokratie im Ersten Weltkrieg") appeared in 1974 and has become, for some, a "standard work" on its subject. Her (even thicker) study of Social Democracy in the confused revolutionary aftermath of war and the founding years of what Hitler later lampooned as the Weimar Republic, followed in 1978, entitled "The Burden of Power" ("Die Bürde der Macht: Die deutsche Sozialdemokratie 1918-1920").

With Heinrich Potthoff, in 1974 Susanne Miller, who had been widowed in 1971, produced a brief history of the SPD. The little book was intended to be used for internal party training purposes. In 2002, when the eighth edition appeared, the volume had expanded from its original 350 pages to 600 pages.

=== The politically engaged academic ===
Between the early 1970s and the end of the 1990s Susanne Miller was active as a confidential lecturer for the party's Friedrich Ebert Foundation and as a member of the foundation's committee responsible for decisions on bursary awards. She had previously contributed to the foundation's activities as a frequent seminar leader and in a consultancy capacity. In addition she undertook a series of foreign study and lecture tours for the foundation, which on occasion took her as far afield as Japan, China, Israel and Poland.

Miller was also concerned with questions of party collaboration between the two Germanies. She was a member of the SPD "Basic Values Commission" which between 1984 and 1987 held meetings with members of the East German Academy for Social Sciences, which had originally been created in 1951 as an agency of East Germany's ruling Socialist Unity Party of Germany (Sozialistische Einheitspartei Deutschlands / SED). These meetings produced the so-called SPD-SED Paper which spelled out the ideological differences between East and West Germany, invoking themes which had previously been excluded from east-west inter-German dialogues. Susanne Miller was entirely open to this form of dialogue with representatives of the East German "socialist" party, but she was robustly intolerant of crimes and human rights violations for which she held the East German communists directly responsible. In this sense she expressly identified herself as an anti-communist.

In 1982 Peter Glotz, at that time the party's "Bundesgeschäftsführer", appointed Susanne Miller to head up the SPD Executive Historical Commission. The Historical Commission was being created on the initiative of Willy Brandt, at the time an iconic figure within and beyond the party. Susanne Miller was its first president. Under Miller's leadership a number of events and presentations were organised on recent German History, and various booklets and leaflets were produced in support of these. The most important of the events organised under Miller's commission presidency occurred in 1987, and was a public meeting in the foyer of the SPD's Erich Ollenhauer Building in Bonn. Those attending were given the chance to meet a number of leading East German historians. The idea was that the resulting exchanges should serve the shared "Inheritance of German History". West German media covered the conference intensively because an exchange of views focused on the direct ideological contrasts between western and eastern historians was seen to be very unusual. Direct scholarly confrontation with East German historians was not an entirely new experience for Miller herself, however, because she had experienced it since 1964 as a participant in the annual "International Conference of Historians of the Labour Movement" at Linz.

Beside her work for the various SPD party agencies, Miller also worked for West Germany's Bundeszentrale für politische Bildung (bpb / Federal Agency for Political Education). Together with Thomas Meyer she led a working group at the Friedrich Ebert Foundation which compiled a three volume teaching compendium on the history of the German labour movement. She herself contributed several chapters. She also sat as a member of the bpb's advisory board. She later insisted that she had succeeded, working together with representatives of the CDU and FDP (parties), in shaping and over many years following a bi-partisan approach to political education. She nevertheless eventually resigned from the bpb advisory board in 1992, asserting that party differences within it were making rational fact based discussion ever more difficult. In terms of contemporary press reports, SPD representatives on the board were themselves not necessarily entirely without blame for the breakdown of the bi-partisan approach.

By the time of German reunification, in 1990, Susanne Miller was 75, but she continued to serve the SPD. In 1996 she was appointed the chair her party's Working commission on previously persecuted Social Democrats (Arbeitsgemeinschaft ehemals verfolgter Sozialdemokraten / AvS). She was already, by this point, a member of the Victims' Association. During her chairmanship, in June 1998, she saw to it that the AvS accepted as members not just persecuted SPD members from the twelve Nazi years (1933-1945) (when SPD membership had been illegal), but also those SPD members who had lived in the German Democratic Republic (East Germany) (1949-1990) and suffered political persecution there.

Miller featured in the public arena because of her support and membership of the German-Israeli Society, and in respect of other issues and causes in which she believed. When, in 1968, the journalist-author Sebastian Haffner published his historical work Der Verrat (The Betrayal), covering some of the political aspects of the succession of revolutionary events that occurred in Germany in the wake of defeat in 1918, Miller was savage in her public condemnation of Haffner's criticisms of the SPD leaders back in 1918/19, and of what she saw as his restricted vision the November Revolution more generally. Susanne Miller was among those who demanded that the German government and the German Economy pay reparations to World War II forced labour victims, and she bemoaned the failure of governments to take account of the expertise available from victims' groups. As well as supporting surviving Holocaust victims in private, towards the end of her life she also took part prominently in the discussions over the Berlin Holocaust Memorial.

== Awards and honours ==
In 1985 the regional government of North Rhine-Westphalia bestowed an honorary professorship on Susanne Miller, now aged 70. In 2004 the Bavarian Georg von Vollmar Academy awarded her their Waldemar von Knoeringen Prize in recognition of her services to the strengthening of democracy and of historical consciousness. The city council of Bonn named a new street after her in November 2013. On the centenary of her birth, in 2015 the Philosophical Academy (Philosophisch-Politische Akademie) and the SPD Archive Centre (Archiv der sozialen Demokratie) got together and held a symposium in Bonn on 25 June 2015 to honour her memory.
