= Grete Hermann =

German mathematician (1901–1984)

- Born: Clara Margarete Hermann; 2 March 1901; Bremen, German Empire
- Died: 15 April 1984 (aged 83); Bremen, West Germany
- Other names: Grete Henry; Grete Henry-Hermann; Leonore Bremer; Gerda Bremer; Peter Ramme
- Citizenship: German; British
- Education: University of Göttingen (PhD), 1925; University of Freiburg
- Known for: Primary decomposition; Critique of Von Neumann's no hidden variables proof; Ratio
- Political party: Social Democratic Party
- Relatives: Carl H. Hermann (brother); Eva Hermann (sister-in-law)
- Scientific career
- Fields: Mathematics; Philosophy; Physics
- Workplaces: Pädagogische Hochschule Bremen; Landerziehungsheim Walkemühle; Philosophisch-Politische Akademie
- Thesis: Die Frage der endlich vielen Schritte in der Theorie der Polynomideale (1926)
- Doctoral advisor: Emmy Noether; Edmund Landau
- Other academic advisors: Leonard Nelson

Philosophical work
- Era: 20th-century philosophy
- Region: Western philosophy
- School: Neo-Kantianism (Neo-Friesian)
- Main interests: Critical philosophy, philosophy of physics, ethics, political philosophy

Grete Hermann (2 March 1901 – 15 April 1984) was a German mathematician, philosopher, theoretical physicist, writer, and educator. She is known for her foundational work in quantum mechanics and computer algebra; her writings on political philosophy; and her work with the Internationaler Sozialistischer Kampfbund (ISK) in opposition to Nazism.

Hermann worked on reconciling the neo-Kantian conception of causality with quantum mechanics. This work led to her critique of Von Neumann's no hidden variables proof. Her criticism was long ignored; it was discovered in 1974 by Max Jammer who publicized it. In 1936, Hermann shared in the award of the Richard Avenarius prize. She was the first graduate student of Emmy Noether and she published the posthumous works of others, including that of Leonard Nelson.

Between 1927 and 1940, Hermann published a number of anti-Nazi articles under various pseudonyms in Der Funke and Sozialistische Warte, publications edited by Willi Eichler. Due to her involvement with the ISK, Hermann had to flee Nazi Germany until the conclusion of World War II. During her exile, she was a leader of the Union of German Socialist Organisations in Great Britain.

In her later years, she co-founded the philosophical journal Ratio, where she was a member of the editorial board until her death. She also became the first head at the Bremen Pedagogical University, a teacher education university, which later integrated into the University of Bremen after her retirement. After the death of Minna Specht, with whom she worked and lived for many years, she took over leadership of Philosophisch-Politische Akademie and became withdrawn from public life, focused on critical philosophy and refining Nelsonian ethics. She died in 1984 in Bremen.

== Early life and education ==
Hermann was born in Bremen, where her father Gerhard Heinrich Hermann was a merchant sailor officer for Norddeutscher Lloyd who also co-owned a stonework factory. Her mother Clara Auguste née Leipoldt was dedicated to religious studies. Hermann had a very close relationship with her mother. Both of her grandfathers were pastors. She took piano lessons. Her father abandoned the family and his work to become a wandering "itinerant preacher" in 1921. She was raised in a middle-class Protestant family with two sisters and four brothers, including physicist Carl H. Hermann.

She was one of few girls admitted by exception to Oberschule am Barkhof, which did not become co-educational until 1953. After graduating in 1920, she took the exam to become a teacher there. However, she instead enrolled at the University of Göttingen in 1921 with her two older brothers, to study Mathematics.

At Göttingen, Hermann was the first student of mathematician Emmy Noether. She also studied under Edmund Landau. She defended her thesis in 1925, which included her majors of study. She was awarded her Doctor of Philosophy (PhD) in Mathematics with minors in Philosophy and Physics. Her thesis was published in 1926 in Mathematische Annalen and incorporated the work of Kurt Hentzelt, a student of Noether and Ernst Sigismund Fischer at the University of Erlangen who died in WWI. Hermann published Hentzelt's theorems after his death. After obtaining her PhD, she studied at the University of Freiburg.

Her PhD thesis, The Question of Finitely Many Steps in Polynomial Ideal Theory (German: Die Frage der endlich vielen Schritte in der Theorie der Polynomideale) is the foundational paper for modern computer algebra. It first established the existence of algorithms (including complexity bounds) for many of the basic problems of abstract algebra, such as ideal membership for polynomial rings. Hermann's algorithm for primary decomposition is used in modern computing.

== Academia and research ==
=== Theoretical physics ===
In 1934, Hermann went to Leipzig "for the express purpose of reconciling a neo-Kantian conception of causality with the new quantum mechanics". In Leipzig, many exchanges of thoughts took place among Hermann, Carl Friedrich von Weizsäcker, and Werner Heisenberg. In these discussions, she argued that Kantian causality should remain secure, and questioned whether quantum uncertainty reflected subjective ignorance or a principled limit requiring a revision of the Kantian framework. The contents of her work in this time, including a focus on a distinction of predictability and causality, are known from three of her own publications, and from later description of their discussions by von Weizsäcker, and the discussion of Hermann's work in chapter ten of Heisenberg's Physics and Beyond. Heisenberg describes her as dissatisfied with intermediate positions, but as partly reassured by replies influenced by Niels Bohr, and presents the exchange as clarifying the relation between Kantian concepts and modern physics.

From Denmark, she published her work The foundations of quantum mechanics in the philosophy of nature (German: Die naturphilosophischen Grundlagen der Quantenmechanik). This work has been referred to as "one of the earliest and best philosophical treatments of the new quantum mechanics". In this work, she concludes:

The theory of quantum mechanics forces us […] to drop the assumption of the absolute character of knowledge about nature, and to deal with the principle of causality independently of this assumption. Quantum mechanics has therefore not contradicted the law of causality at all, but has clarified it and has removed from it other principles which are not necessarily connected to it.

In June 1936, Hermann was awarded the Richard Avenarius prize together with Eduard May and Th. Vogel.

==== Hidden variables ====
Based on her views on quantum causality, Hermann concluded that there was no way to explain quantum mechanics in terms of a hidden variable theory. However, she published a critique of John von Neumann's 1932 proof from his book Mathematical Foundations of Quantum Mechanics, that was widely claimed to show that such a theory was impossible. Hermann's work on this subject went unnoticed by the physics community until it was independently discovered and published by John Stewart Bell in 1966, and her earlier discovery was pointed out by Max Jammer in 1974. Some have posited that had her critique not remained nearly unknown for decades, her ideas would have put in question the unequivocal acceptance of the Copenhagen interpretation of quantum mechanics, by providing a credible basis for the further development of nonlocal hidden variable theories, which would have changed the historical development of quantum mechanics.

=== Pedagogy ===
During the period of Nazi Germany, Hermann was in exile in Denmark and Britain as a member of Internationaler Sozialistischer Kampfbund (ISK), an anti-Nazi political organization. During this time, she visited Germany and France in secret to continue her research. Her first position upon her return to Germany was at a secondary school for girls in Karlsruhe teaching mathematics, where she remained until October 1949, when she was appointed the first provisional head at the Bremen Pedagogical University (BPU), a teacher education university. She was denied a professorship due to her British citizenship, which had nullified her German citizenship. The senator for schools and education, Christian Paulmann, advocated for her German citizenship to be restored so she could become a professor in Bremen, arguing that she had proved herself by rejecting appointments at Marburg University and the University of Tübingen, after which she was awarded dual citizenship. She became a full professor in July 1950, and she requested to step down to deputy head. While there, she was accused of indoctrinating the college toward Marxism and materialism by the Christian Democratic Union of Germany. During her tenure until 1966, and into her retirement, she supported its transformation into a full university. BPU integrated into the University of Bremen between 1971 and 1973. After she retired, she withdrew from academia aside from critical philosophy.

=== Philosophy ===
Hermann worked as an assistant for Leonard Nelson, a German mathematician and philosopher in the Neo-Friesian school of thought, beginning in 1925. She was skeptical of Nelson's rigidity, finding many of his rules to be restrictive of free thought. When her mother fell ill, Nelson discouraged her from visiting her bedside, due to the Nelsonian ideal of prioritizing political matters over private ones. As a result, Hermann did not see her mother before she died. She later wrote about this as an example of Nelson's inhumanity and ethical issues surrounding his philosophies. When Nelson died in 1927, she continued to work on many of the problems he posed. In 1945, she published Politik und Ethik (English: Politics and Ethics; published in 1947), a criticism of political apathy and the complicity of bystanders in The Holocaust. In it she concludes:

Whoever lives in the Third Reich or otherwise comes to terms with it, but isolates themselves from the political events around them in order to occupy themselves with other, in themselves beautiful and worthy subjects, is lending their name and their work to this system. There is no neutrality towards the legal and cultural decline in public life. Whoever does not oppose it is complicit in it. Whatever beautiful and good things they may create otherwise are devalued by this participation in the social injustice with which it is burdened.

In 1957, she co-founded the philosophical journal Ratio. She remained a member of the editorial board until her death. After she retired from pedagogical work, she focused entirely on re-shaping Nelsonian thought with her ethics until nearly her death. In a letter in July 1983 she wrote:

I wish to understand by what modification the core of truth in Nelsonian philosophy can be freed from its misleading absolutist claims and its true meaning vindicated.

In her paper Die Überwindung des Zufalls (English: Overcoming Contingency; or Conquering Chance as published in 1991), a critical response to Nelson's work, she concludes that moral judgement is emergent from cooperation of reason and sensibility. Her thesis argued that aside from "mindless panic", there are no behaviors which arise solely from internal mental activity or external influences through the senses. This was directly in opposition to Nelson's belief that reason by itself could generate action, which was central to the absolutist foundation of Nelsonian ethical reason being uninfluenced by external stimuli. Hermann argued that repeated ethical behavior would not absolutely lead to predictable future actions in accordance with moral duty, and reliance on that belief led to complacency that resulted in allowing moral injustices to occur, or immoral actions. She wrote that moral behavior necessarily requires constant labor involving evaluation of the external environment and inner thoughts.

Gustav Heckmann, the philosopher who wrote her obituary in Ratio, published her final (1984) paper Die Überwindung des Zufalls: Kritische Betrachtungen zu Leonard Nelsons Begründung der Ethik als Wissenschaft (English: Thoughts on the Principle of Fair Adjustment in the Ethics of Leonard Nelson) posthumously in 1985. In this work, Hermann refined her earlier works, in which she argued that spatial awareness was equally as important to understanding how people are motivated by personal interests because that motivation extends to the social world. She concludes that Kantian practical experience is a necessary component of the study of ethical decision-making, which Heckmann explains to mean that our relationships with people and early socialization are necessarily part of how we govern our behaviors.

== Politics and exile ==
Nelson co-founded ISK with Minna Specht in 1925, when Hermann began working for him. She waited to join ISK until after Nelson's death due to rules and demands he imposed on members that she perceived as threatening to her intellectual independence, including requiring members to adhere to vegetarianism and leave the church. Specht was the director of Landerziehungsheim Walkemühle, a progressive school with adult political training, where Hermann took over some of Nelson's philosophy classes after he died. The ISK was vehemently opposed to the Nazi Party and connected with the Quakers in Europe, after Nelson encountered John Sturge Stephens and Norman Angell at Göttingen. Stephens introduced Nelson to Alfred Barratt Brown, a Quaker and Principal at Ruskin College, to build more support for ISK through the European Quaker and pacifist network in academia.

=== During World War II ===
After Nelson's death, she and Specht published Nelson's work System der philosophischen Ethik und Pädagogik in 1932. Willi Eichler replaced Nelson as the leader of ISK and started a newspaper called Der Funke, in which Hermann used several pseudonyms to publish articles denouncing Nazism and totalitarianism. She, her brother Carl, and his wife Eva became critical of religion as Adolf Hitler began campaigning, joining the pacifist movement, and, in 1933, at the onset of the Nazi persecution of Jews, Carl and Eva joined the Quakers to help Jews escape. In March, as Hitler came into power, Walkemühle was occupied by Nazi Germany, and the school was closed and cleared by Nazi forces. Hermann and Specht arranged for the important documents from the school to be preserved by Willi Warnke, who was intercepted by the Nazis and the documents confiscated. Warnke was executed in 1938. Carl and Eva were both arrested and jailed by the Nazi police for harboring a Jewish family in 1943.

Between 1935 and 1940, Hermann contributed political philosophy works to a socialist periodical edited by Eichler in Paris called Sozialistische Warte, under the pseudonyms Leonore Bremer, Gerda Bremer and Peter Ramme. Hermann fled Germany for Denmark in 1934, where she taught Socratic philosophy at exile schools, first on Funen with Specht, then in 1936 at Copenhagen in a school established by Gustav Heckmann, with whom she lived. In 1937, she and Specht fled to Britain as the Nazi occupation of Denmark began. Peter Scott, a Quaker who founded the Brynmawr Experiment and who was connected with ISK, offered to house the school at the settlement in Wales, so Hermann, Specht, and the other teachers moved the school there. However, due to Defence Regulation 18B, teachers began to be captured and placed in internment camps, the school soon closed and Hermann and Specht relocated to London in 1938.

In London, she met Edward Henry, a technician and member of the Socialist Vanguard Group, the British arm of ISK. They married in February 1938. At the time, it was nearly impossible for German exiles to obtain work permits, so many refugee women married to be automatically granted British citizenship. Thus, the marriage was classified as a marriage of convenience that protected her from internment due to Nazi persecution. She resided with Specht. In a letter in a 1946 job application to train teachers at Schule an der Vegesacker Straße, she stated she was not bound by her marriage, and urgently wished to help reconstruct Germany. While in London, Hermann and Specht were leaders of the Union of German Socialist Organisations in Great Britain.

=== Post World War II ===
After World War II ended, in 1946, she divorced Henry, joined the Social Democratic Party (SPD), and returned to what would become West Germany. She then combined her interests in physics and mathematics with political philosophy. She became critical of Western scientific inquiry, which she felt was one-sided and ignored ethical responsibility in its pursuit. Starting in 1947 she was a contributor behind the scenes to the Bad Godesberg Programme, prepared under the leadership of Eichler and issued in 1959, which provided a detailed modernising platform that carried the party into government in the 1960s.

Hermann was the head of central officefor the Education and Science Workers' Union from 1953 until 1965. During this time, Specht had also returned to Germany, where she became the head of the Odenwaldschule in Heppenheim and chair of the Philosophisch-Politische Akademie (PPA), an organisation founded by Nelson in 1922, oriented towards education, social justice, responsible political action and its philosophical basis. When Specht retired in 1954, she removed to Bremen with Hermann. They resided together until Specht's death in 1961, after which time Hermann withdrew from public life, rarely appearing in public, and assumed leadership of PPA. While there, she retired from her teaching post to focus entirely on critical philosophical thought and oversaw the posthumous publication of Nelson's works until 1978.

Hermann died in April 1984 in Bremen.

== Select publications ==
- Hermann, Grete (1926). "Die Frage der endlich vielen Schritte in der Theorie der Polynomideale: Unter Benutzung nachgelassener Sätze von K. Hentzelt" [The question of the finite number of steps in the theory of polynomial ideals: Using unpublished theorems by K. Hentzelt.]. Mathematische Annalen (in German). 95 (1): 736–788. doi:10.1007/BF01206635. ISSN 0025-5831.
- Hermann, Grete (1935). "Die naturphilosophischen Grundlagen der Quantenmechanik" [The Philosophical Foundations of Quantum Mechanics]. Die Naturwissenschaften (in German). 23 (42): 718–721. doi:10.1007/BF01491142. ISSN 0028-1042.
- Hermann, Grete (1945). Politik und Ethik [Politics and Ethics] (in German). London: Renaissance Publishing Co.
- Henry-Hermann, Grete (1948). "Die Kausalität in der Physik" [The Causality in Physics] (PDF). Studium Generale (in German). 1 (6): 375–383 – via Università della Svizzera italiana.
- Henry, Grete (1973). "The Significance of Behaviour Study for the Critique of Reason". Ratio. 15 (2): 206–220 – via The Friesian School.
- Henry-Hermann, Grete (1985) [1984]. Heckmann, Gustav (ed.). Die Überwindung des Zufalls: kritische Betrachtungen zu Leonard Nelsons Begründung der Ethik als Wissenschaft [Thoughts on the Principle of Fair Adjustment in the Ethics of Leonard Nelson] (in German). Hamburg: Meiner. ISBN 978-3-7873-0658-9.
- Henry‐Hermann, Grete (1991) [1953]. Winch, Peter (ed.). "Conquering Chance: Critical Reflections on Leonard Nelson's Establishment of Ethics as a Science". Philosophical Investigations. 14 (1): 1–80. doi:10.1111/j.1467-9205.1991.tb00490.x. ISSN 0190-0536.
