= Sozialistische Warte =

German socialist exile periodical (Paris; 1934–1940)

- Publisher: Éditions Nouvelles Internationales
- Editor-in-chief: Willi Eichler
- Founded: 1934
- Ceased publication: May 23, 1940
- Political alignment: Internationaler Sozialistischer Kampfbund
- Language: German
- City: Paris

The Sozialistische Warte (English: Socialist Outlook (Note: Also translated as "Socialist Watch" and "Socialist Viewpoint" in various literature.)), Blätter für kritisch-aktiven Sozialismus (English: Pages for a Critically Active Socialism), was a German socialist exile periodical published from May 1934 to May 23, 1940, from Paris. It was the direct successor to the isk – Mitteilungsblatt des Internationalen Sozialistischen Kampfbundes.

== History ==
Even before Adolf Hitler's rise to power, the ISK was actively publishing in French and English for readers in France, Britain and the United States. Four periodicals were later published during its Parisian exile alone. As a successor to the publishing house Öffentliches Leben, the ISK founded a publishing house in Paris in 1933, Éditions Nouvelles Internationales (ENI). Willi Eichler served as the editor, after he was exiled from Nazi Germany and forced to stop publishing Der Funke.

Under the known pseudonyms Werner Buchholz, Ernst Friesius, and Martin Hart, Eichler wrote many editorials, as well as other shorter pieces. From March 1936, SW featured the discussion forum Freie Sozialistische Tribüne (English: Free Socialist Tribune). This was intended to open the periodical to non-members of the ISK, such as the writer Kurt Hiller.

Unlike the Reinhart Letters, which appeared during the same period, complete anonymity was not employed; instead, articles were widely published under known pseudonyms. The background information smuggled out of Germany was regularly analyzed by, among others, the intelligence services of the Western Allies and the National Socialists. The average print run was 2,000 copies, some of which were printed on Bible paper as a disguise, with a special cover "Stimme der Zeit" (English: "Voice of the Times") and altered headlines. The periodical was never profitable, rather it was a total loss for the publishers because a large portion of the print run had to be distributed free of charge. Attracting new subscribers during this period was difficult, and a functioning distribution network was nonexistent.

The Sozialistische Warte (SW) was initially published monthly from May 1934. From March 15, 1936, it appeared every two weeks, and from October 15, 1937, until the outbreak of the Second World War, weekly. Afterwards, it reverted to a fortnightly publication schedule due to difficulties in recruiting new contributors and with postal distribution; furthermore, the first problems with paper supplies arose. Following the German invasion of the Netherlands and Belgium, SW ceased publication entirely; the last issue appeared on May 23, 1940.

== Notable contributors ==
- Walter Auerbach (ITF): known pseudonyms: W. D., Walter Dirksen
- Erna Elisabeth Blencke (ISK): known pseudonyms: Rosa Fricke, R. F.
- Eugen Brehm (SAPD): known pseudonyms: Max Herb, mhb, Ernst Bredt, h-b
- Max Braun (SPD)
- James Broh: known pseudonyms: Junius
- Theodor Dan (Russian exile organization Menschewiki)
- Alfred Dannenberg (ISK): known pseudonyms: A. Buehring
- Julius Deutsch (RSÖ)
- Kurt Karl Doberer (SPD)
- Fritz Eberhard (ISK): known pseudonyms: Fritz Kempf, F. K.
- Willi Eichler (ISK): known pseudonyms: Martin Hart, H. M., Walter Buchholz, Walter Holz, Ernst Friesius, -t., E. F., Hart, H.?, -s., Fr., -lz., s., M. H., -z., W-er.
- Julius Epstein
- Walter Fabian (SAPD, Gruppe Neuer Weg): known pseudonyms: W. F.
- Edo Fimmen (ITF)
- Ernst Fraenkel (SPD): known pseudonyms: Fritz Dreher, Conrad Juerges, Max Gerber
- Max Fürst
- Boris Goldenberg (SAPD): known pseudonyms: Bernhard Thomas, R. Frey, Gilbert
- Fritz Groß: known pseudonyms: Peter Michael
- Kurt R. Grossmann: known pseudonyms: Felix Burger, Kay R. Gilbert
- Werner Hansen (ISK): known pseudonyms: Heinz Klein, W. H., H. Klein, W. Hs, -n, W. Ha
- Iwan Heilbut
- Grete Henry-Hermann (ISK): known pseudonyms: Gerda Bremer, P. R., Peter Ramme, Leonore Bremer
- Kurt Hiller: known pseudonyms: Gorgias, Die Schriftleitung der FST
- Maria Hodann (ISK): known pseudonyms: Mary Saran, M. Jensen, M. S.
- Hans Jahn (Railway workers of ITF): including Pseudonyme: Fritz Kramer
- Josef Kappius (ISK): known pseudonyms: J. Schmidt
- Max Richard Kleineibst (Religious-Socialist Association): known pseudonyms: Klaus Buehler
- Gerhard Kreyssig (SPD)
- Heinz Kühn (SPD): known pseudonyms: Georg Hellmuth
- Gerhard Kumleben: known pseudonyms: F. G, François Gérard
- Otto Lehmann-Rußbüldt: known pseudonyms: Argus
- Hans Lehnert: (ISK) known pseudonyms III Frank, Karl Feurer
- Richard Lengyel: known pseudonyms: A. Rudolf, Raoul Laszlo
- Rudolf Leonhard (Association of German Writers Abroad)
- Thomas Mann
- Paul Mattick (International Council Correspondence)
- Hilde Meisel (ISK): known pseudonyms: Selma Trier, H. Monte, Hilde Monte
- Leonard Nelson (ISK-Begründer)
- Nora Platiel-Block (ISK): known pseudonyms: Leonore Kolb, L. K.
- Bernhard Reichenbach (Rote Kämpfer)
- John B. Priestley
- Willi Schlamm
- Arthur Seehof: known pseudonyms: Die Schriftleitung
- Kurt D. Singer
- Anna Siemsen (SPS)
- Minna Specht (ISK): known pseudonyms: Thérèse Bering
- Stefan Szende (SAPD)
- Fritz Sternberg (SAPD)
- Otto Strasser (Schwarze Front)
- Leo Trotzki
- Walther Victor: known pseudonyms: W. V.
- Jakob Walcher (SAPD)
- Erich Wollenberg (SPD)
