= Gustav Heckmann =

German philosopher and teacher (1898–1996)

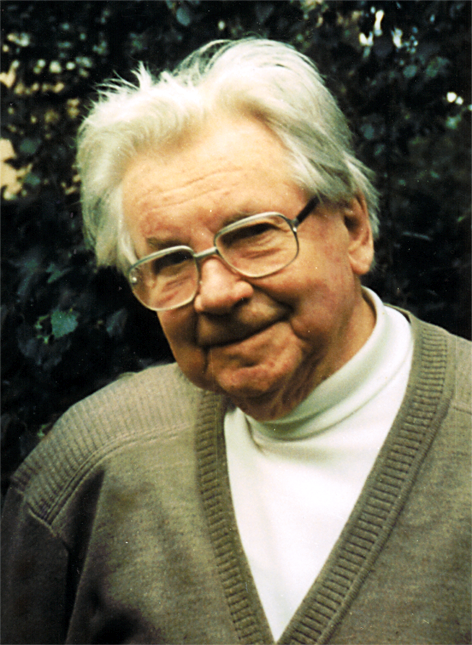
- Born: 12 April 1898; Voerde, Rhine Province, Prussia, German Empire
- Died: 8 June 1996 (aged 98); Hannover, Germany
- Education: Göttingen
- Occupations: Teacher; Philosopher; Political activist
- Political party: SPD
- Spouse: Charlotte Sonntag (1945)

Gustav Heckmann (22 April 1898 – 8 June 1996) was a German philosopher and teacher. He is particularly associated with philosophical extrapolations from the Socratic Dialogue format, pioneered by his mentor and friend Leonard Nelson, with which Heckmann continued to work after Nelson died.

In 1932 he was an instigator of the so-called Urgent Call for Unity ("Dringender Appell für die Einheit"), a public appeal, signed by 32 high-profile intellectuals, urging the principal left wing parties to unite ahead of the first 1932 General election in order to block Nazi success. The Appeal failed in its objective, but it marked out its instigators as prominent opponents of the Nazi party: Heckmann went into exile in 1933. Twelve years later, on returning to Germany, in 1945 he became, for a few years, an influential member of the Social Democratic Party (SPD).

== Life ==
=== Provenance and early years ===
Gustav Heckmann was born into a traditional "church and emperor" family at Voerde, a town in the industrial Rhineland region, at the extreme western edge of Germany. After successful completion of his schooling he volunteered for military service, serving in the war initially as a paramedic and later as a soldier.

War ended in 1918 and Heckmann moved on to study mathematics, Physics and Philosophy at Marburg, Berlin and Göttingen. It was at Göttingen that he received his doctorate in 1924. This work was supervised by Max Born. In 1925 he passed the state exam necessary for a teaching position. While still a student one of his teachers was the philosopher Leonard Nelson, and he now applied for a teaching post at the "Landerziehungsheim Walkemühle" educational institution with which Nelson was closely involved. At this stage, however, Nelson rejected his application, recommending that he instead obtain teaching experience in the public schools sector. Two years later, after complying with Nelson's non-negotiable condition that he cut all ties with the church, which had led to protracted wrangling with his parents, Heckmann was accepted as a teacher at the "Walkemühle" Philosophical-Political Academy in 1927. Nelson himself died unexpectedly at the end of October, and Heckmann served a rigorous apprenticeship under the supervision of Minna Specht who had worked closely with Nelson, and who headed up the academy between 1927 and its closure.

The Walkemühle Academy was effectively the educational academy of the International Socialist Militant League (Internationaler Sozialistischer Kampfbund / ISK), which had grown out of a movement that had broken away, under the leadership of Nelson and Specht, from the mainstream Social Democratic Party in 1917. Shortly after Nelson's death Gustav Heckmann joined the ISK, leadership of which had fallen to Willi Eichler. Between 1927 and 1933 Eichler, Spricht and Heckmann worked together to promote and evolve the ISK's neo-Kantianist vision of socialism, defined through the prism of Socratic method as an ethical concept, but one bereft of the determinism implicit in the works of Karl Marx, and unimpeded by the religious distractions implicit in Christianity. Heckmann's life experiences would lead him to develop Nelson's methodology of political philosophy towards his understanding of its Socratic basis, and a more practical and less absolutist search for truth.

=== Nazi years and exile ===
The outcome of the 1930 General election came as a huge shock for Heckmann whose activities, along with those of his ISK colleagues, quickly acquired a more political focus, while his teaching work at the "Walkemühle" was suspended. In 1932, backed by Minna Specht and Hellmutt von Rauschenplat who also taught at the academy, Heckmann instigated the publication in a newspaper of the ISK's Urgent Call for Unity ("Dringender Appell für die Einheit"), a public appeal, signed by 32 high-profile intellectuals, urging the Social Democratic and Communist parties to unite ahead of the first 1932 General election in order to block Nazi success. Much of the text was drafted by Heckmann himself, including a prescient and resonant warning referencing Schiller against allowing inbuilt inertia and cowardice of the heart to leave the way open for a decline into barbarism. By the time of the second 1932 General election, in November, the Nazi party's share of the popular vote had been cut from 37.3% to 33.1%, which was actually slightly below the combined shares of the SPD and Communist parties, but the two left-wing parties remained mutually mistrustful and the Nazi tide proved unstoppable. Régime change in January 1933 was quickly followed by the creation of Germany's first one-party dictatorship. The "Walkemühle" Academy had for most purposes been closed in 1931 in order to enable Specht, Eichler and Heckmann to concentrate on more direct opposition to the rise of the Nazi Party, and now, at the start of February 1933, its premises were taken over by members of the Nazi Party's military wing (SA). They were formally confiscated on 17 March 1933 and the Political-Philosophical Academy was proscribed under the wide-ranging mandate of the Enabling Act of 24 March.

While Eichler fled to Paris, Minna Specht and Gustav Heckmann escaped together to Denmark, accompanied by the children's section of the academy. In a Danish hamlet they were able to use an old manor house which was large but unmodernised. Water came via a handpump, and much effort had to be expended heating the "school" room before lessons could begin: activities were constantly overshadowed by a concern that necessary permission to operate the school might not be renewed. Although at this stage industrial scale slaughter of German Jews still lay in the future, the Nazis had lost little time in enacting Anti-Jewish legislation, and it became progressively more obvious that Jews would be disadvantaged in any Nazi future. The number of refugee schoolchildren accompanying them to Denmark was initially 15, but this increased little by little over the next couple of years to approximately 25, of whom roughly 50% were Jewish: along with teaching and maintaining the old manor house, Specht and Heckmann devoted themselves to seeking out Danish families who might be able and willing to look after Jewish children and other children of exiled or disappeared German left-wing activists, in the event of a German invasion.

As the political situation in Germany evolved, at the end of 1938 Specht and Heckmann decided to relocate again, this time to Britain. The philanthropist Peter Scott provided premises for the ten children of the senior school at Cwmavon, a short distance to the east of Swansea, while the younger children were accommodated at Abergavenny, on the far side of Merthyr Tydfil. Scott's Welsh refuge had originally been established to support unemployed coal miners, and after its philanthropic objectives were switched it lost government support. The school moved for a period to the village of Redhill a little to the south of Bristol in England.

Meanwhile, September 1939 saw the anticipated return of war between Britain and Germany. For some time it remained unclear what this would involve on the "home front": one government response had a particular impact on people who had fled from Germany to Britain in order to escape government persecution because of their race or political beliefs. Invoking Regulation 18B of the Defence (General) Regulations 1939, the government identified several thousand German refugees as enemy aliens and placed them in internment camps. Heckmann and Specht were arrested on 3 and 5 June 1940: Heckmann spent some time interned in Canada. Their refugee school children were looked after by Quakers, socialists and German refugees who had avoided arrest.

In the early summer of 1941 the British government decided to release the majority of their German refugee internees on the condition that they would join the Pioneer Corps, believed to be the only British army corps prepared to accept those identified as "enemy aliens". Heckmann was shipped back from Canada to Britain and released. His duties with the Pioneer corps included transporting concrete blocks, and other building work in connections with the construction of nissen huts. Another German exile who had ended up in Britain was Heckmann's old teacher from Göttingen, Max Born, who had held a professorship at Edinburgh since 1939 and who managed to extricate Heckmann from the Pioneer Corps. He was now given war work that involved superintending the demagnetising of allied shipping in order to afford protection from German metallic mines.

=== Homecoming ===
Gustav Heckmann returned to Germany after the war. In 1945 he married Charlotte Sonntag, who had taught the exiled schoolchildren with him in Denmark and Britain. In 1946 he obtained a professorship in Philosophy and Pedagogy at the Pedagogical Academy of Hannover (as it was then known). The ISK having by now become an organisation devoted to opposing Nazism, dissolved itself now that Nazism was seen to have been destroyed.

Like most former ISK members in Germany, Gustav Heckmann joined the no longer banned SPD. Within the party, however, he came into conflict with the party leadership in 1950 when he started collecting signatures of those critical of an article in the regional constitution of North Rhine-Westphalia. Heckmann and those who thought like him believed that by excessively accommodating the interests of the church, the new constitution risked limiting the freedom of conscience of teachers, with the accompanying risk that the region's schools might suffer from an excess of clerical interference.

He continued to work with Leonard Nelson's vision of Socratic Method, and enriched it with new elements, notably so-called "Meta-Gespräch".

A committed opponent of nuclear weaponry, he was involved from the outset in the Easter Marches in Germany, demonstrating against nuclear weapons in the East and in the West. He was a speaker at the 1960 demonstration at the Bergen-Hohne Training Area, remembered as an early "star march" ("Sternmarsch") for which protesters converged from various different starting points including, in this case, Hamburg, Bremen, Braunschweig and Hannover.

== † ==
Gustav Heckmann died at Hannover on 8 June 1996. He was 98.
