= Werner Hansen =

German politician (1905–1972)

- Born: 31 July 1905; Rethem, Province of Hanover, Prussia, German Empire
- Died: 15 June 1971 (aged 65); Neuss, North Rhine-Westphalia, West Germany
- Occupations: Trades Union leader Anti-Nazi resistance Bundestag member
- Parent(s): Heinrich & Karoline Heidorn

Werner Hansen (31 July 1905 – 15 June 1971) was a German Social democratic politician and trades unionist. After 1933 he stayed in Germany for several years undertaking illegal resistance work, and emigrating only in 1937. He was able to return and resume his trades union career in 1945.

== Life ==
Werner was born, one of three sons, at Rethem, a small but long established town located between Bremen and Hanover. His father, Heinrich Heidorn, worked for the post office. It is not known when, why or how Werner changed his own family name to Hansen. His secondary education took him to a "commercial school" in Hanover. Between 1923 and 1927 he was employed as a clerk in a gold and silver trading business.

Hansen joined both the Social Democratic Party (SPD) and, in 1926, the Zentralverband der Angestellten (ZdA), a white collar trades union. In 1927 he relocated to Bremen, becoming a member of the Internationaler Sozialistischer Kampfbund (ISK / "International Socialist Militant League")), later contributing to "Der Funke", which was the daily newspaper published by the ISK for slightly more than twelve months, starting in January 1932.

Régime change came to Germany at the start of 1933 and the new government lost little time in creating its one-party dictatorship. Membership of political parties (apart from the Nazi party) became illegal. In Bremen it proved impossible to undertake political work, and Hansen moved to Cologne where he was able to undertake clandestine work for the ISK while supporting himself with casual jobs as a kitchen assistant in a succession of hotels. Between 1933 and 1937, together with Hans Dohrenbusch, he took a leading role in illegal political work in the Rhineland, while managing to maintain trades union contacts internationally, notably with the International Transport Workers' Federation. He was briefly detained by the Gestapo in 1937. A wave of arrests which accompanied the effective smashing of his clandestine network in the Rhineland persuaded him to flee to France later in the same year. In 1938 or 1939 he moved on to England where in north-west London there was already a substantial community of ISK political exiles from Germany which he joined.

War broke out in September 1939, with large-scale aerial bombing of British cities starting in June 1940. On the home front the British government reacted by identifying several thousand refugees who had fled Germany to escape race-based and political persecution as enemy aliens and arresting them. Hansen was one of those interned in June 1940 and transported to Australia where he remained till November 1941 when he was permitted to return. He spent the rest of the war in England, politically active with other exiled German socialist activists, working closely with Willi Eichler, like him the son of a postal worker.

War ended formally in May 1945, but with the help of the British military Hansen was able to return to Germany in March 1945. One of the first of the political exiles to return, he made his way to Cologne, designated as part of the British occupation zone following a full invasion of Germany, and met up with fellow trades unionist Hans Böckler. During the next few years, supported by the occupying forces, he set about reconstructing the trades union structure in the historically industrial Rhineland region. At Bielefeld in 1947, at the founding congress of the Confederation of German Trade Unions (DGB / "Deutscher Gewerkschaftsbund") for the British occupation zone, Böckler was elected the organisation's first chairman while Hansen took over from him at the head of the DGB's Nordrhein-Westfalen region. He presided over the DGB in the Nordrhein-Westfalen region between 1947 and 1956, unanimously elected to the position on four successive occasions. After, until his retirement in 1969, he served of the DGB's national executive.

Hansen was a secularist who believed, in the words of one Christian contemporary, that the DGB should operate as "the extended arm of the Social Democratic Party (SPD)". Between 1953 and 1957 he sat in the West German Bundestag as an SPD member representing the Nordrhein-Westfalen electoral district.
