= Eva Hermann =

German resistance fighter (1900–1997)

- Born: Eva Emilie Anna Elise Lüddecke; May 24, 1900; Grünenplan, German Empire
- Died: 31 July 1997 (aged 97); Marburg, West Germany
- Other names: Eva Hermann-Lueddecke; Eva Hermann-Lüddecke
- Known for: Rescue of Jews during the Holocaust
- Spouse: Carl H. Hermann
- Relatives: Grete Hermann (sister-in-law)

Eva Hermann (née Lüddecke; May 24, 1900 — July 31, 1997) was a German teacher, writer, and resistance fighter in Nazi Germany. She and her husband were arrested and imprisoned for harboring a Jewish family by the Nazi police. For their work rescuing Jews, they were awarded by Yad Vashem the Righteous Among the Nations.

== Early life ==
Hermann was born in Grünenplan to Protestant parents Ewald, a pastor, and Elisabeth. She had one brother. She attended boarding school in Döbeln, where she lived from age 13 until she was 21. She then moved to Berlin-Dahlem to work as a private tutor. In 1923, she joined the Protestant youth movement, where she met Carl H. Hermann, a physicist who was working at the Kaiser Wilhelm Institute for Fiber Chemistry. They were married and later adopted two children from whom they were separated for many years during World War II (WWII).

They became pacifists during the rise of Adolf Hitler's power in Germany, joined the Fellowship of Reconciliation and relocated to Mannheim. In 1933, at the onset of Nazi Germany, with Wilhelm Mensching, she dissolved the fellowship in Germany and joined the Quakers in Europe. Carl remained an agnostic for two years, before joining in 1935.

Hermann's sister-in-law, mathematician and philosopher Grete Hermann, had to flee to Denmark and Britain for her involvement with Internationaler Sozialistischer Kampfbund and anti-fascist political writings until the end of WWII. After unsuccessfully attempting to obtain an appointment abroad, Hermann's husband accepted a position at IG Farben working under Rudolf Brill as a crystallographer.

== Resistance in Nazi Germany ==
With the Quakers, Hermann and her husband began providing assistance to Jews who were facing persecution with anti-Jewish legislation. They helped facilitate emigration and provided aid to help exiles settle abroad. When Jews were deported to Gurs camp in southern France, they spent all their earnings to send food, clothing, and money. They were essential coordinators and leaders of the effort within the Quakers, helping to maintain contact between rescuers and illegally listening to BBC broadcasts to disseminate foreign news, which was a capital offense under Nazi policy. In October 1940, Hermann compiled a list of every Jew deported from Mannheim and every resultant suicide.

When the city was declared Judenfrei, one of Hermann's friends from school, Hilde Rosenthal, and her husband Fritz, were attempting to avoid deportation using the name Rasch. While traveling across Germany from Berlin, they hid at the Hermanns' apartment for several weeks, before being moved to another Quaker home. They were arrested by the Gestapo in March 1943; Fritz committed suicide and Hilde was detained. The following month, Hermann's husband was arrested for listening to foreign radio broadcasts. After Hilde was interrogated and deported to Auschwitz concentration camp, Hermann and the remaining people who helped the Rosenthals evade capture were arrested. Hermann was sentenced to three years in prison. Her husband was shown leniency due to his scientific work that was deemed essential during the war, and the argument that execution for English broadcasts was discretionary, he was instead sentenced to eight years at the Halle an der Saale jail. He had to continue to work for the Government of Nazi Germany during his sentence. They both served two years, having been freed when the war ended.

After the war, Hermann and her husband relocated to Frankfurt am Main, due to the fact that their home was destroyed during the air raids on Germany. There they joined a children's feeding program as volunteers to help rebuild Germany. Hermann also became involved in the Christian–Jewish reconciliation and began writing for Quaker publications about her time imprisoned in Alsace.

In April 1977, Hermann and her husband were awarded medals by Yad Vashem the Righteous Among the Nations. Hermann was hesitant to accept. She said:

How can I not hesitate before accepting? Are we sufficiently aware, against the background of the darkest chapter in German history, of how guilty we are for rescuing no more than a tiny droplet out of the endless sea of despair of that period? Righteous can therefore have no other meaning than the attempt, the obligation, to do what is right and to live humanly even during times of inhumanity.

== Publications ==
- Hermann, Eva (1948). Gefangen und doch frei [In Prison, Yet Free]. Pennsylvania: The Tract Association of Friends.
- Hermann, Eva (1970). In dem, was ewig ist [In that which is eternal] (PDF) (in German). Germany: Religiöse Gesellschaft der Freunde (Quäker).
- Eva Hermann (1996). "Eva Hermann oral history" (Interview). Interviewed by Pradelski, Minka. USC Shoah Foundation. Interview code 19848.
