= Ilse Barea-Kulcsar =

Austrian writer and communist activist (1902–1973)

- Born: Ilse Wilhelmine Elfriede Pollak; 20 September 1902; Vienna, Austria-Hungary
- Died: 1 January 1973 (aged 70); Vienna, Austria
- Burial place: All Saints' Church, Faringdon, Oxfordshire, England
- Citizenship: Austria; United Kingdom (from 1948)
- Education: Black Forest School
- Alma mater: Faculty of Political Sciences and Law, University of Vienna
- Occupations: Journalist, writer, translator, communist and anti-fascist activist
- Employer(s): Rote Fahne; Der Funke; Time and Tide; New Statesman; Times Literary Supplement; Tribune; BBC
- Organization(s): Communist International; Working Group of Socialist Translators and Interpreters
- Notable work: Vienna: Legend and Reality (1966)
- Political party: Socialist Students of Austria (VSStÖ); Socialist Youth Austria (SJÖ); Social Democratic Workers' Party of Austria (SDAP); Communist Party of Austria (KPÖ); Labour Party (UK)
- Other political affiliations: Neu Beginnen
- Movement: Austrian Civil War; Republican faction in the Spanish Civil War
- Spouse(s): Leopold Kulcsar (m. 1922, d. 1938); Arturo Barea (m. 1938, d. 1957)

Ilse Wilhelmine Elfriede Barea-Kulcsar (née Pollak; 20 September 1902 – 1 January 1973), also known as Ilsa, was an Austrian journalist, novelist, translator and teacher. She was also a communist political activist, anti-fascist activist and resistance fighter who campaigned in Austria, volunteered in the Spanish Civil War and went into exile in Britain.

== Early life and education ==
Barea-Kulcsar was born on 20 September 1902 in Vienna, Austria-Hungary, as the eldest of three children. Barea-Kulcsar's father Valentin Pollak (1871–1948) was of Jewish descent with ancestors from the Jewish communities in Eisenstadt and Mattersburg. He worked as director of the Wasa-Gymnasium. Her mother Alice von Zieglmayer (1872–1948) came from a wealthy and conservative family of the Austria-Hungarian lower nobility and was the eldest of six daughters in her family.

Barea-Kulcsar was educated at the first girls high school in Vienna, Black Forest School (German: Schwarzwaldschule), which was founded by pedagogue Eugenie Schwarzwald. She then studied political science at the Faculty of Political Sciences and Law of the University of Vienna from 1920 to 1928. She spoke German, English, French, Italian and Spanish fluently.

== Activism ==
Barea-Kulcsar became involved in left wing politics and grassroots activism while a student, serving as deputy chairwoman of the Association of Socialist Secondary School Students. She joined the Social Democratic Workers' Party of Austria (SDAP) and it's youth wing Socialist Youth Austria (SJÖ). She was also a member of the Socialist Students of Austria (VSStÖ) and was editor of their newspaper. She campaigned for annexation to the newly founded Communist International, also known as the Third International.

In 1921, Barea-Kulcsar left the SDAP for ideological reasons and joined the recently established Communist Party of Austria (KPÖ). She met Leopold Kulcsar, a fellow KPÖ party member. In 1922, they married. She worked for the party press and wrote for the newspaper Red Flag (German: Rote Fahne), with her writings based in Leninist ideas. In 1924, she was given a one-year publishing ban by the KPÖ and she and her husband were both expelled from the party.

In 1925, Barea-Kulcsar travelled to Hungary for the Communist International. She was arrested in Budapest and spent four months in prison. She was deported to Vienna in 1926.

Barea-Kulcsar returned to the SDAP in 1926. She worked for the SDAP as a traveling teacher in rural eastern Austria. She gave lectures on topics including the nature of the capitalist economy; the constitution and politics of the First Austrian Republic; and community politics. She also wrote the brochure Great Powers of Finance and Industry (German: Großmächte der Finanz und der Industrie) for the party in 1930.

Under the proto-fascist government of the Chancellor of Austria, Engelbert Dollfuss, from 1932 to 1934, Barea-Kulcsar organized with the underground resistance. She wrote for the German anti-fascist newspaper Der Funke, a publication of the Internationaler Sozialistischer Kampfbund (ISK), which argued for a united front against Nazism from bourgeois liberals to communists. The newspaper was banned in February 1933.

Barea-Kulcsar and her husband participated in the Austrian Civil War (German: Österreichischer Bürgerkrieg) in February 1934, also known as the "February Uprising." Her husband was arrested and Barea-Kulcsar narrowly avoided arrest herself. She went into hiding in the apartment of the future British Labour Party politician and leader Hugh Gaitskell, who was living in Vienna that year while studying on a Rockefeller scholarship. Barea-Kulcsar and her husband were also expelled from the SDAP for working with clandestine cells of the German left-wing splinter group Neu Beginnen (German: New Beginning). Under threat of rearrest, they fled to Brno, Czechoslovakia using false passports, where they lived for two years.

Barea-Kulcsar continued to campaign in résistante against fascism in Czechoslovakia. She and her husband became friendly with socialist leader Otto Bauer, who offered them financial aid. Barea-Kulcsar found a job working as editor of the quarterly Austro-Marxist Socialist Tribune publication, writing under the pseudonym "Robert Werner."

At the outbreak of the Spanish Civil War, in the autumn of 1936 Barea-Kulcsar left Brno for Valencia, Spain, to support democracy, anti-fascism and the Republican faction. She was helped to travel by the Spanish Embassy in Paris, France, and was given a letter of recommendation from the Spanish ambassador and Spanish Socialist Workers' Party (PSOE) member Luis Araquistáin. She later wrote that:

I had to participate in the Civil War, not only because the most important fight between fascism and democracy –a democracy that contained the germ of a socialist future– was being fought there, but also because I, with my experience in international journalism, perhaps I could be useful even after the victory.

Her husband Kulcsar remained in Czechoslovakia, working for the embassy of the Second Spanish Republic in Prague. Their political views had begun to differ, with Kulcsar supporting Joseph Stalin.

In Spain, Barea-Kulcsar's first name was hispanized from Ilse to Ilsa. She worked as a journalist, as a pamphleteer and organised tours for the correspondents of the international press, so that they could see the ravages of bombs and cover the destruction in their reports. She was not in favour with high-ranking members of the Republican faction, who were suspicious of her as an Austrian woman. She felt that "socialism wasn't tied to being a Communist Party member," which was interpreted as proof of "ideological unreliability." She was, however, able to mediate and translate between Spaniards and foreign journalists thanks to her language skills.

After moving to Madrid, Barea-Kulcsar met the Spanish director of the foreign press censorship office, Arturo Barea. She became his deputy at the censorship office, working together on the fifth floor of the Telefónica building on Gran Vía, often sleeping on cots in the office. They later fell in love. Her first husband Kulcsar died on 28 January 1938 in Prague, under "mysterious circumstances" which may have been linked to the Soviet secret police. She remarried to Barea in February 1938.

== Life in exile ==
After the defeat of the Republican faction in the Spanish Civil War, Barea-Kulcsar and her new husband went into exile. They firstly moved to Paris, where they lived in poverty in a small room at the Hôtel Delambre and shared one typewriter. In February 1939, they moved to England. Her parents escaped from occupied Austria within Nazi Germany the same month and moved to live with their daughter and son-in-law. They all settled in Puckeridge, Hertfordshire, England.

Barea-Kulcsar wrote articles for British publications Time and Tide, the New Statesman, the Times Literary Supplement, and the Tribune. During World War II, from August 1939 she worked for the BBC Monitoring service as a journalist and translator in Evesham, Worcestershire, England. In this role, she listened to Nazi radio broadcasts and translated from German into English what the stations were reporting. She worked alongside Ernest Gombrich, George Weidenfeld, Martin Esslin and Anatol Goldberg. She also broadcast for the BBC's World Service.

After the war, Barea-Kulcsar, her husband and parents moved to Middle Lodge, Eaton Hastings, Oxfordshire, England. They rented the house from Gavin Henderson, 2nd Baron Faringdon, of Buscot Park. Barea-Kulcsar became a British citizen in 1948 and joined the British Labour Party. Her niece Uli was orphaned during World War II and moved to live with them in England.

While in exile in France and England, Barea-Kulcsar wrote the serialised novel Telefónica, an account of four days during the Spanish Civil War. It was published in 70 instalments between March and June 1949 in German in the Austrian socialist newspaper Arbeiter-Zeitung (German: "Workers' Newspaper"). The book was released as a single work in Spanish and German for the first time in 2019, with an afterword by Georg Pichler. In the work, Barea-Kulcsar described the "organizational chaos" and "rebellious currents crossing each other" during the Spanish Civil War. She also described the variety of people living in the building, including foreign correspondents, members of the military and civilian administration, security and intelligence officers, censors, leaders of political parties and trade unions, telephone operators, refugees, women and children. She wrote of her own experiences that:

When the cleaning women started offering me food without me having asked for it or patting me on the shoulder I knew I was going to obtain citizenship within Telefónica.

Barea-Kulcsar also edited and translated the works written by her husband Barea from Spanish into English, including his three volume autobiography The Forging of a Rebel, but with only his authorship acknowledged. While working as a translator for English and American publishing houses, she served as chair of the Working Group of Socialist Translators and Interpreters.

== Return to Austria ==
Barea died from a heart attack caused by undiagnosed cancer on 24 December 1957. After she was widowed for the second time, Barea-Kulcsar moved to London, then returned to Vienna in 1965 at the invitation of the Austrian Trade Union Federation (ÖGB). In Austria she resumed Austrian citizenship, continued to write and worked as an educational official for the SPÖ. She was awarded the Josef Luitpold Stern Prize of ÖGB (1970) and the Victor Adler plaque (1972).

In 1966, Barea-Kulcsar released the social history and cultural history book Vienna: Legend and Reality, which was originally published in English. In 1968, translations were published in Danish and Spanish. The book was republished as second edition by Faber & Faber in 2012. It was translated into German by Julia Brandstätter and Gernot Trausmuth and edited by Can Leaf in 2021.

== Death and legacy ==
Barea-Kulcsar died after a long illness on 1 January 1973 in Vienna, Austria, aged 70. She was buried with her second husband and parents at All Saints' Church, Faringdon, Oxfordshire, England.

At the time of her death, Barea-Kulcsar had been working on her autobiography. She featured in the memoirs and writings of Francisco Ayala, Ernest Hemingway and John Dos Passos. Some of Barea-Kulcsar's archives are held at the Bodleian Library of the University of Oxford.

In 2014, Barea-Kulcsar featured in Amanda Vaill's non-fiction book Hotel Florida: Truth, Love and Death in the Spanish Civil War.

In 2021, a commemorative plaque in Barea-Kulcsar's honour was erected on Bernhardtstalgasse in Vienna.
