= Marianne Kühn =

German politician (1914–2005)

Marianne Kühn (17 November 1914 - 13 June 2005) was a German politician.(SPD). In her later years she made a new career for herself in the world of the arts, and as a painter of Naïve art.

== Life ==
Marianne was born in Cologne a few months after the outbreak of the First World War. After leaving school she trained as a legal assistant. When she was 15 she joined the Rote Falken, a youth group for the children of socialist leaning families. Three years later, on 1 November 1932, she joined the Social Democratic Party (SPD). Less than a year later, the Nazis took power in January 1933 and lost little time in converting the German state into a one-party dictatorship. Party political activity (unless in support of the Nazi party) became illegal. Marianne was already involved with Heinz Kühn, who had already also been involved in the Rote Falken. He was a railway worked who helda position of some prominence in the SPD locally, and whom she would marry in 1939. Rejecting the reassurances of friends that things would return to normality within a few months of the Nazi power grab, the two of them emigrated to Belgium from where they continued to work against the German Nazi Party.

After the war ended, she returned to Cologne with her husband, remaining politically engaged. With her husband and Susanne Miller she was a co-founder of the Socialist Education Association (Sozialistischen Bildungsgemeinschaft ) in Cologne. Between 1952 and 1973 she was a city councillor, representing the Dellbrück district of Cologne, where she had her home along the Roteichenweg. It was nevertheless her husband who had the more stellar political career. Heinz Kühn served as the regional prime minister of North Rhine-Westphalia from 1966 till 1978.

In 1979 Marianne Kühn opened a small art gallery at the couple's home in the Cologne garden suburb of Dellbrück. It was described as a "Naive-Kunst-Galerie" and the focus was on Naïve art. She presented 65 exhibitions of art from across the world, including pieces from Eastern Europe, Israel, Ethiopia, Argentina, China and Tanzania, but at the centre was a core of around 250 exhibitors from the historic German lands. She also produced paintings herself and built up her own art collection.

After her home city had rejected her offer to donate her collection to Cologne, in 2003 Marianne Kühn gifted her collection of approximately 650 pieces to the Vestische Museum in nearby Recklinghausen.
