= Anatol Goldberg =

Anatoly "Anatol" Maksimovich Goldberg MBE (Russian: Анатолий Максимович Гольдберг; 7 May 1910 in St Petersburg – 5 March 1982 in London) was a broadcaster and writer who became head of the BBC Russian Service during the Cold War.

== Life ==
Goldberg was born on 7 May 1910 in St Petersburg, Russian Empire. Following the Russian Revolution he emigrated with his parents in 1918 and settled in Berlin, where he attended a French school, and later studied Chinese and Japanese at the Berlin School of Oriental Studies.

In the early 1930s when an architecture student he made his first visit to Moscow, acting as interpreter on the construction of the British embassy. He was a "brilliant linguist and a lifelong Anglophile", and with the advent of the Nazi government in Germany he and his wife emigrated to Britain, where at the outbreak of World War II in 1939 he joined the BBC Monitoring Service, working in German, Russian and Spanish. He worked alongside Ilse Barea-Kulcsar and other translators.

From its inception on 26 March 1946 he was a member of the Russian Service of the BBC and rose to become its head. In this position in the 1950s he was the focus of a dispute between the Foreign Office and the BBC, the former accusing him of appeasement of the Soviet regime, and in the late 1960s was attacked from Moscow over Czechoslovakia. However, for 35 years he delivered his Sunday evening interpretation of British and world current affairs, "Notes by our Observer", to his Russian audience, along with numerous additional topical commentaries. He was made MBE for his services, and was retained by the BBC beyond the normal retirement age. He had the reputation of being a helpful colleague, "always willing to give others the benefit of his great experience, elephantine memory and wide international contacts". He died in his post in 1982 at the age of 71, having recently celebrated his golden wedding.

== Controversy ==
Goldberg was broadcasting to the Soviet Union at a time when the tone and purpose of the broadcasts were disputed within the BBC. John Tusa, former head of the BBC World Service, wrote of Goldberg's position: "great men such as the Russian Service commentator Anatol Goldberg... insisted that it was insulting to tell the Soviet audience how lousy life was; they knew that better than you did. What they wanted was facts. The BBC gave them facts and analysis; opinions they could provide themselves."

In fact the BBC's position seems to have been more complex. Ian Jacob, the BBC's Director of Overseas Services, wrote in 1949, "It is evident that any country deciding to embark on a service of broadcasts to foreign audiences does so because it wants to influence those audiences in its favour. All such broadcasting is therefore propaganda." The government department with responsibility for producing the propaganda was the Information Research Department, or IRD, a secret unit within the Foreign Office. A 1957 internal memorandum by the BBC's Foreign Office Liaison Officer says "much of the material and a great deal of the background for the BBC's broadcasts to the Soviet Union, the satellites and China reaches the BBC from this department. The liaison in this respect is both close and constant."

The issue of propaganda "led to bitter editorial disputes within the BBC", and with the death of Joseph Stalin in March 1953 the debate intensified. Goldberg, among others, "argued that the dictator's death might provide a fresh opportunity for dialogue with the Soviet audience and for the encouragement of gradual political liberalisation", while a conservative faction was sceptical of the new leadership and judged that change in the Soviet Union would come about only through pressure.

Goldberg "considered his contacts with the IRD personal, and he maintained very good relations with various IRD representatives." However in the mid-1950s "the IRD had sixty staff, permanent and contract, in the Soviet section" and elements unfriendly to his position attempted to discredit Goldberg and establish a harder BBC line:

It was against this background that the IRD drew up a detailed charge-sheet against the BBC's Russian Service. It accused Goldberg of being "ambivalent" towards the Soviet regime and of having an attitude "more in accord with a dissident form of doctrinaire Marxism than with British feelings". The insinuation of disloyalty was obvious enough. Indeed, in one document, the IRD urged either "the replacement of Mr Goldberg... by someone who accepts our conception of the role of broadcasting to Russia" or else the replacement of Goldberg's immediate superior.

The IRD said its complaint was "fundamentally about the general atmosphere and emphasis" of BBC Russian broadcasts and that "the definition of the role of the BBC's broadcasts to Russia is primarily a matter for the Foreign Office". The BBC was broadcasting material that was "damaging to the Free World", and the Russian Service failed to reflect "responsible British opinion" and followed a general line "more like that of the New Statesman and Nation". The BBC declined to dismiss Goldberg, but in 1957 The Spectator, seemingly primed by the IRD, attacked the Russian Service "on grounds very similar to those put forward in 1953", accusing the service of "moral compromise and appeasement", and specifically charging Goldberg. In 1958 Goldberg was replaced as head of the Russian Service, but he was retained as its main commentator.

Following the invasion of Czechoslovakia in 1968, Goldberg's commentaries stung the Soviet Union into accusing him of subversion and espionage.

== Impact of broadcasts ==
From April 1949 the Soviet authorities expended "vast amounts of money and technical expertise" on jamming foreign broadcasts, and "a significant part of the USSR's entire radio broadcasting system was devoted to blocking transmissions from abroad." The BBC's Russian Service was blocked "selectively and varyingly", and jamming was not fully effective, as a 2008 communication to the New Statesman makes clear:

I had [the] privilege to listen [to the] BBC observer Anatolii Maksimovich Goldberg from 1948, when I was 13 years old, to 1979 when I left the Soviet Union forever. The impact of his analysis of political, cultural and historical events was unbelievable. For me and people like me Anatol Goldberg exemplified the highest intellectual level and incomparable ability to analyse the most complicated events in the world in such a way that everybody could understand. There [was] no surprise that in the Soviet Foreign Ministry diplomats always wanted to know Goldberg's opinion on many subjects they discussed with one another. Isn't this the highest recognition of "our observer Anatolii Maksimovich Goldberg"?

A former employee of the Russian Service reports:

In 1990, I visited Moscow. Ordinary Russians were at last willing to talk freely into the microphone. Goldberg, so it turned out, had had listeners even during Stalin's lifetime. One Russian told me that Goldberg's uniqueness lay in the way "he destroyed the enemy image.... He taught us, or at least me, to see Britain not as a potential enemy, but as a society made up of people who, like us, just want to live.... And in this sense [he] was one of the main agents who prepared the ground for our perestroika."

Professor Boris Grushin, a one-time adviser to Boris Yeltsin, said that during the cold war Goldberg was "the only human voice that reached our country from abroad. He was extraordinarily popular. He was the Number One."

In 1979 the Soviet Union issued a book warning of the dangers of the BBC, and drew attention to Goldberg's broadcasts:

one can hear in his commentaries a respectful tone towards his audience, a familiarity with the true facts of real life, the outward appearance of logic in his reasoning. One can hear of his genuine concern over the threat of military conflicts and the atmosphere of violence in the world, of the 'satisfaction' which he feels at the peace initiatives of various states including the USSR. Goldberg's talks are characterised by a soft, conversational tone, skilful use of intonation and emphasis, reasonableness, solidity and even wit.

The Russian dissident and exile Alexander Solzhenitsyn insisted the BBC should not endow the Kremlin with a sense of legitimacy, and on a visit to the BBC in 1976 refused to meet Goldberg.

== Biography of Ilya Ehrenburg ==
At the time of his death, Goldberg was working on, and had substantially completed, a study of Ilya Ehrenburg, subtitled Revolutionary, novelist, poet, war correspondent, propagandist: the extraordinary epic of a Russian survivor. It was brought to press by his former BBC colleague Erik de Mauny. The New York Times wrote, "Ilya Ehrenburg, born into a well-to-do Jewish family in Kiev in 1891, was an outsized romantic who fell in love with Russia, revolution and Europe, embracing all three simultaneously, unable to deny any of them even when they betrayed his vision of their ideals.... No one was better fitted to write his biography than Anatol Goldberg, a product of the same cultivated Russian-Jewish professional class that molded Ehrenburg's temperament."

In paying tribute to Goldberg's gifts as a biographer, de Mauny says the study "sometimes seems too ready to give its subject the benefit of the doubt."
