= Carl H. Hermann =

German physicist (1898–1961)

Carl Heinrich Hermann
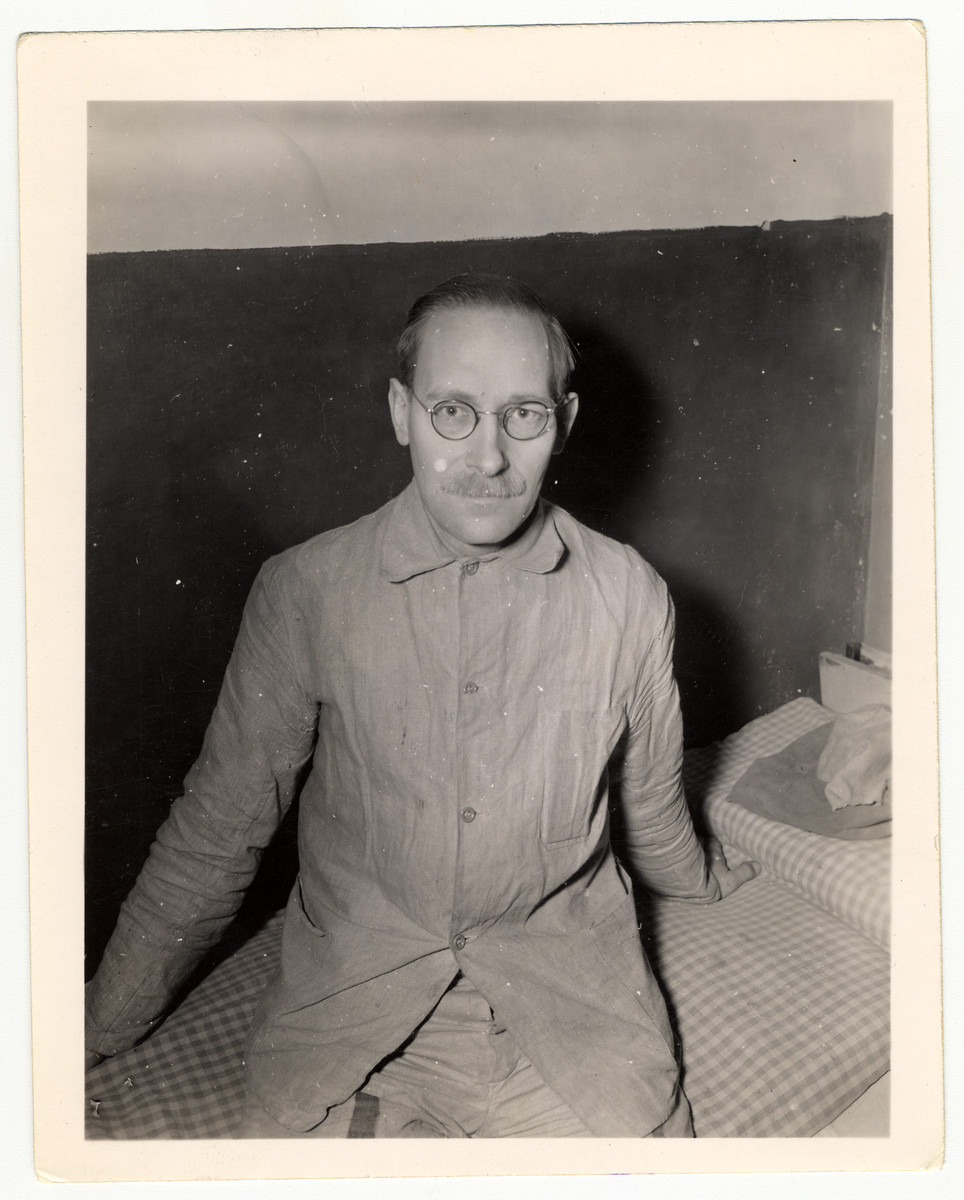
- Born: June 17, 1898; Lehe, German Empire
- Died: September 12, 1961 (aged 63); Marburg, West Germany
- Education: University of Göttingen, PhD (1923); University of Stuttgart, Dr. habil. (1931)
- Known for: Hermann–Mauguin notation; Strukturbericht designation; Carl Hermann Medal; Rescue of Jews during the Holocaust
- Spouse: Eva Hermann
- Relatives: Grete Hermann (sister)
- Scientific career
- Workplaces: Kaiser Wilhelm Institute; University of Stuttgart; Darmstadt University of Technology; University of Marburg
- Thesis: Die Symmetriegruppen der amorphen und mesomorphen Phasen (1931)
- Doctoral advisor: Max Born
- Other academic advisors: Herman Francis Mark; Paul Peter Ewald

Carl Heinrich Hermann (17 June 1898 – 12 September 1961), also spelled Karl Hermann (German: [kaʁl ˈhɛʁman]), was a German physicist, crystallographer, and resistance fighter in Nazi Germany. He is known for his research in crystallographic symmetry, nomenclature, and mathematical crystallography in N-dimensional spaces.

Hermann was a pioneer in crystallographic databases and, along with Paul Peter Ewald, published the first volume of the influential Strukturbericht (Structure Report) in 1931.

In 1943, he and his wife were imprisoned by the Gestapo for harboring a Jewish family. They were honored with medals of the Righteous Among the Nations by Yad Vashem in 1976.

== Biography ==
=== Early life and education ===
Hermann was born in the north German port town of Lehe to Gerhard Heinrich Hermann, a merchant sailor officer for Norddeutscher Lloyd who also co-owned a stonework factory, and Clara Auguste née Leipoldt, was dedicated to religious studies. His grandfathers were both pastors of Protestantism. He had six siblings, including mathematician Grete Hermann, and they grew up middle class.

He studied mathematics and physics at the University of Göttingen, where he received his doctorate in 1923, as a pupil of Max Born and a fellow student with Werner Heisenberg. Upon graduation, he moved to Berlin-Dahlem to work under Herman Francis Mark at the Kaiser Wilhelm Institute for Fiber Chemistry (now Fritz Haber Institute of the Max Planck Society). Later in 1925, he joined Paul P. Ewald at the University of Stuttgart, where he achieved his habilitation in 1931.

=== Early career ===
Along with Ewald in Stuttgart, he nurtured the growing field of crystallography, especially the study of space groups, and began what was later to become Structure Reports (Strukturbericht), a reference series giving every known crystal structure determination. During his Stuttgart years, Hermann also developed the first description of anisotropic properties of materials from a crystallographic perspective.

When the Nazi Party rose to power, he objected to its political restrictions on academic positions, leaving to take a position as a physicist with the industrial dye firm I.G. Farben at Ludwigshafen, where he continued his crystallographic research and studied symmetry in higher-dimensional spaces.

=== World War II ===
During World War II, he and his wife Eva Hermann (née Lüddecke; 1900 – 1997), who were both Quakers and pacifists, helped provide deported Jews with food, clothing and other resources. After the city of Mannheim was declared Judenfrei (free of Jews), they hid Jews in their home from Nazi authorities. In 1943 he and his wife were arrested and brought before a special tribunal. As his scientific work was deemed too essential to the war effort, Hermann was given a "mild" sentence of eight years of imprisonment, while Eva was sentenced to three years. He was allowed to continue his research while imprisoned, being brought to his laboratory in the mornings and taken back to his cell at night. After two years of imprisonment, he and Eva were both released at the end of the war.

=== Post-World War II ===
After the war, he lectured briefly at Darmstadt Polytechnic (now Darmstadt university of technology) between 1946 and 1947. Then, in 1947, he accepted a newly formed chair in crystallography at the University of Marburg, where he became director of the Crystallographic Institute and remained until his death. During his Marburg years, Hermann's research laid the foundation for N-dimensional crystallography. He died unexpectedly of a heart attack in his sleep in September 1961.

== Legacy ==
The symmetry notation introduced by Hermann and Charles-Victor Mauguin, which later became an international standard notation for crystallographic groups known as the Hermann–Mauguin notation or International notation.

In 1976, for their work in saving Jews from the Holocaust, Hermann and his wife Eva were honored as Righteous Among the Nations by Yad Vashem. Eva Hermann wrote about the honor: "I am fully conscious of the fact that my late husband and I did nothing special; we simply tried to remain human in the midst of inhumanity."

In August 1994, the German Crystallographic Society (DGK) established the Carl Hermann Medal, its highest distinction, for outstanding contributions to the science of crystallography.

== Bibliography ==
=== Books ===
- Ewald, Paul Peter; Hermann, C (1931). Strukturbericht, 1913-1928 (in German). Leipzig: Akademische Verlagsgesellschaft. OCLC 29150452.
- Hermann, C; Lohrmann, O; Philipp, H (1937). Strukturbericht 1928-1932 Band II (in German). Leipzig: Akademische Verlagsgesellschaft. OCLC 258079094.
- Hermann, C (1944). Internationale Tabellen zur Bestimmung von Kristallstrukturen = International tables for the determination of crystal structures (in German). Berlin: Borntraeger. OCLC 465164866.

=== Selected articles ===
- Hermann, Carl (1923). "Über die natürliche optische Aktivität der regulären Kristalle NaClO3 und NaBrO3". Zeitschrift für Physik (in German). 16 (1): 103–134. Bibcode:1923ZPhy...16..103H. doi:10.1007/BF01327384. ISSN 1434-6001. S2CID 121330650.
- Hermann, C. (1928-12-01). "XVI. Zur systematischen Strukturtheorie: I. Eine neue Raumgruppensymbolik". Zeitschrift für Kristallographie - Crystalline Materials. 68 (1–6): 257–287. doi:10.1524/zkri.1928.68.1.257. ISSN 2196-7105. S2CID 202161702.
- Hermann, C. (1929-10-01). "XVI. Zur systematischen Strukturtheorie: II. Ableitung der 230 Raumgruppen aus ihren Kennvektoren". Zeitschrift für Kristallographie - Crystalline Materials. 69 (1–6): 226–249. doi:10.1524/zkri.1929.69.1.226. ISSN 2196-7105. S2CID 101077444.
- Hermann, C. (1929-10-01). "XVII. Zur systematischen Strukturtheorie: III. Ketten- und Netzgruppen". Zeitschrift für Kristallographie - Crystalline Materials. 69 (1–6): 250–270. doi:10.1524/zkri.1929.69.1.250. ISSN 2196-7105. S2CID 202161574.
- Hermann, C. (1929-10-01). "XXXV. Zur systematischen Strukturtheorie.: IV. Untergruppen". Zeitschrift für Kristallographie - Crystalline Materials. 69 (1–6): 533–555. doi:10.1524/zkri.1929.69.1.533. ISSN 2196-7105. S2CID 202160467.
- Hermann, C. (1931-08-01). "Bemerkung zu der vorstehenden Arbeit yon Cli. Mauguin". Zeitschrift für Kristallographie - Crystalline Materials. 76 (1–6): 559–561. doi:10.1524/zkri.1931.76.1.559. ISSN 2196-7105. S2CID 100934456.
- Hermann, C. (1931-11-01). "Die Symmetriegruppen der amorphen und mesomorphen Phasen". Zeitschrift für Kristallographie - Crystalline Materials. 79 (1–6): 186–221. doi:10.1524/zkri.1931.79.1.186. ISSN 2196-7105. S2CID 100926117.
- Hermann, C. (1934-12-01). "Tensoren und Kristallsymmetrie". Zeitschrift für Kristallographie - Crystalline Materials. 89 (1–6): 32–48. doi:10.1524/zkri.1934.89.1.32. ISSN 2196-7105. S2CID 101051334.
- Brill, R.; Grimm, H. G.; Hermann, C.; Peters, Cl. (1939). "Anwendung der röntgenographischen Fourieranalyse auf Fragen der chemischen Bindung". Annalen der Physik (in German). 426 (5): 393–445. Bibcode:1939AnP...426..393B. doi:10.1002/andp.19394260502.
- Hermann, C. (1949-06-02). "Kristallographie in Räumen beliebiger Dimensionszahl. I. Die Symmetrieoperationen". Acta Crystallographica. 2 (3): 139–145. Bibcode:1949AcCry...2..139H. doi:10.1107/S0365110X49000382.
- Hermann, C. (1952), "Translationsgruppen in n Dimensionen", Zur Struktur und Materie der Festkörper (in German), Berlin, Heidelberg: Springer Berlin Heidelberg, pp. 24–33, doi:10.1007/978-3-662-29427-7_2, ISBN 978-3-662-27919-9
- Hermann, C. (1960-11-01). "Zur Nomenklatur der Gitterkomplexe". Zeitschrift für Kristallographie - Crystalline Materials. 113 (1–6): 142–154. doi:10.1524/zkri.1960.113.jg.142. ISSN 2196-7105. S2CID 97731438.
