= Urgent Call for Unity =

Political appeal

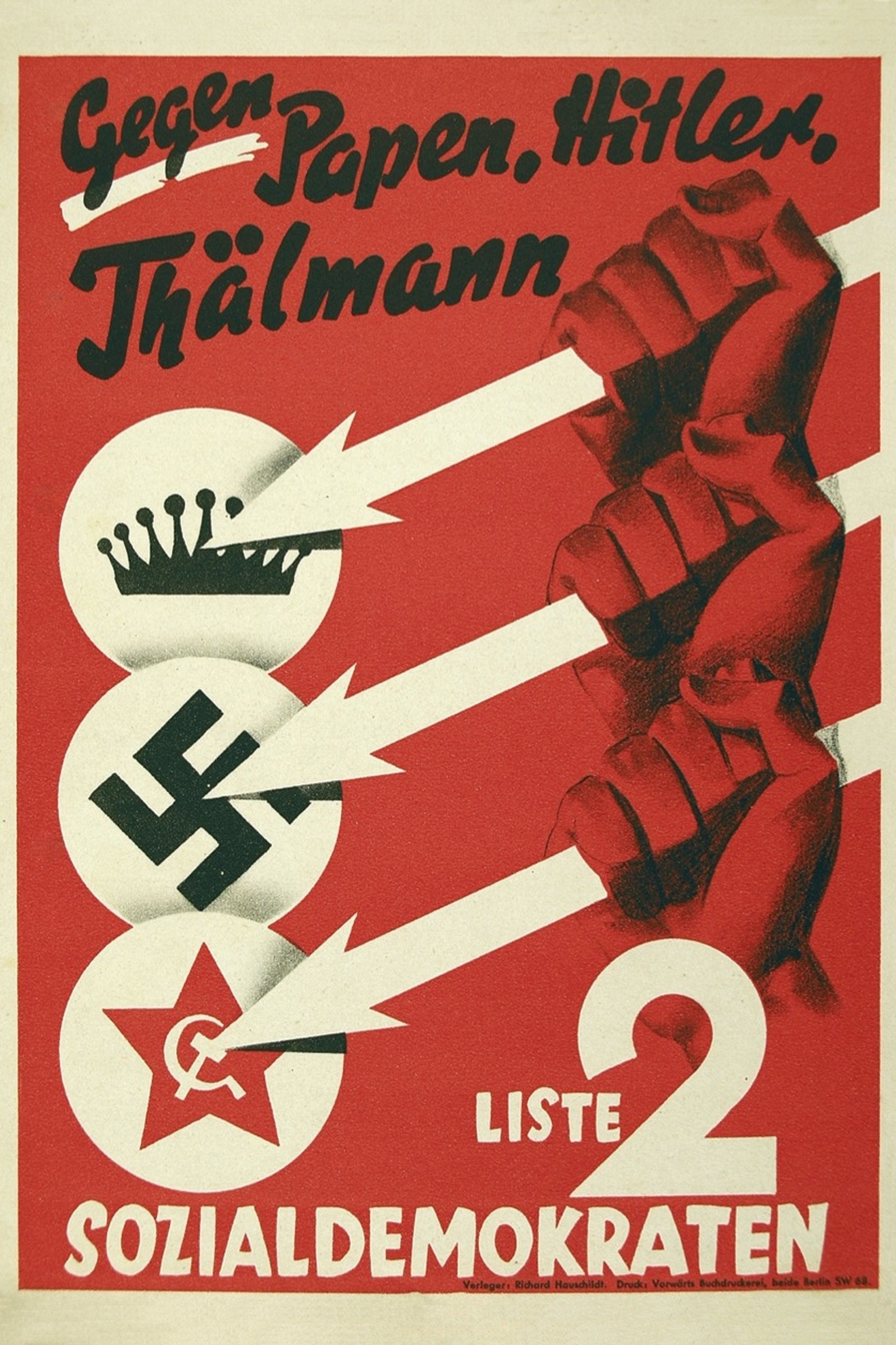
Election post from SPD in 1932, with the slogan "Against Papen, Hitler, Thälmann."

The "Urgent Call for Unity" (German: Dringender Appell für die Einheit) was an appeal by the Internationaler Sozialistischer Kampfbund (ISK) to defeat the National Socialist German Workers Party. It was signed by nearly three dozen well-known German scientists, authors and artists in advance of the German federal election in July 1932.

== Background ==
The June 1932 appeal called for support of the Social Democratic Party (SPD) and the Communist Party (KPD) in the Reichstag election to prevent the National Socialists from gaining control of the government. The appeal was unsuccessful, and Adolf Hitler was later appointed chancellor, and the National Socialists were able to consolidate power.

The appeal was published in the ISK's newspaper, Der Funke, in response to the growing strength of the NSDAP. Placards were also put up all over Berlin.

== Text ==
Urgent Appeal!

The annhiliation of all personal and political freedom

in Germany is imminent, if there is not success at the last minute, without prejudice to the principles of opposites, to consolidate all forces that are united in the rejection of fascism. The next opportunity for this is July 31st. It is imperative to use this opportunity and finally take a step toward

Building a united labor front,

which is necessary not just for the parliamentary, rather for additional defense as well. We're addressing everyone who shares this conviction with us, to aid in this urgent call to

Coalesce around the SPD and KPD in this election,

best materializing in the form of joint candidate lists, however, at least in the form of joint party lists. Not only in the political parties, but especially in the large labor organizations, it is essential to exert every conceivable influence. Let us ensure that no sloth of nature or cowardice of heart allow us sink into barbarism!

Chi-yin Chen / Willi Eichler / Albert Einstein / Karl Emonts / Anton Erkelenz Hellmuth Falkenfeld / Kurt Großmann / E[mil] J. Gumbel / Walter Hammer Theodor Hartwig / Vitus Heller / Kurt Hiller / Maria Hodann (Note: After her emigration to Great Britain, Maria Hodann took the name Mary Saran.) / Hanns-Erich Kaminski / Erich Kästner / Karl Kollwitz / Käthe Kollwitz / Arthur Kronfeld
E. Lauti / Otto Lehmann-Russbüldt / Heinrich Mann / Pietro Nenni / Paul Oestreich / Franz Oppenheimer / Theodor Plivier / Freiherr von Schoenaich August Siemsen / Minna Specht / Helene Stöcker / Ernst Toller / Graf Emil Wedel (Note: This is probably the Graf Emil von Wedel from Großenhain mentioned in "Bürgermeisterwahlen 1927 – ein historischer Exkurs". Retrieved July 8, 2010 (in German)) / Erich Zeigner / Arnold Zweig

== Second attempt ==
On February 12, 1933, two weeks after Adolf Hitler was named Reichskanzler, an identical appeal was made to rally against Hitler in advance of the German federal election, March 1933. Placards appeared on February 14. This time, there were only 19 signatories, such as Heinrich Mann and Käthe Kollwitz and her husband, Karl. (Note: The other signatories were Willi Eichler, Karl Emonts, Hellmuth Falkenfeld, Kurt Großmann, E.J. Gumbel, Theodor Hartwig, Maria Hodann, Käthe Kollwitz, Karl Kollwitz, Robert Kuczynski, Otto Lehmann-Russbüldt, Heinrich Mann, Paul Oestreich, August Siemsen, Minna Specht, Erich Zeigner. In addition, there was Anna Siemsen, sister of August Siemsen, as well as Marie Westphal-Krause and Karl Zwing. Körner lists only the first 16 names (see footnote 11), but the PDF file of Der Funke, Edition No. 321, p. 3 shows three additional signatories.)

== Immediate cultural repercussions ==
On February 15, 1933, the day after the new placards appeared, both Mann, the head of the poetry department, and Kollwitz were forced to withdraw from the Akademie der Künste, Berlin, by Bernhard Rust, a National Socialist who became the acting head of the Prussia Ministry of Culture on February 2, 1933 and thus curator of the Akademie. Rust insisted that their presence endangered the very existence of the Akademie.

The Akademie president, Max von Schillings, called a meeting of the entire Akademie that very evening and announced the departure of Kollwitz and said that Mann would also have to quit, or he would quit himself. The minutes of the meeting report that there were protests from members because Mann was not present and had not been invited. The meeting was interrupted so that Mann could be called by telephone, and the meeting was then resumed and Mann's resignation was announced. There were protests, including one from Berlin city planner Martin Wagner, who then walked out. In the following days and months, numerous leading artists quit or were forced out of the institution. Alfons Paquet declared his solidarity in a letter on February 17. In March 1933, Paquet, Alfred Döblin and Thomas Mann (younger brother of Heinrich) quit. In April, Ricarda Huch quit. Max Liebermann, Paul Mebes, Otto Dix and Karl Schmidt-Rottluff quit in May 1933, after the book burnings. In July 1937, Ludwig Mies van der Rohe, Ernst Barlach and Ernst Ludwig Kirchner quit.

== See also ==
- List of Germans who resisted Nazism
- Weimar Germany

== Bibliography ==
- Werner Link, "Die Geschichte des Internationalen Jugendbundes (IJB) und des Internationalen Sozialistischen Kampfbundes (ISK)." Hain, Meisenheim (1964) in Marburger Abhandlungen zur Politischen Wissenschaft, Vol. I, edited by Wolfgang Abendroth. (in German)
