= Fritz Eberhard =

German journalist and politician (1896–1982)

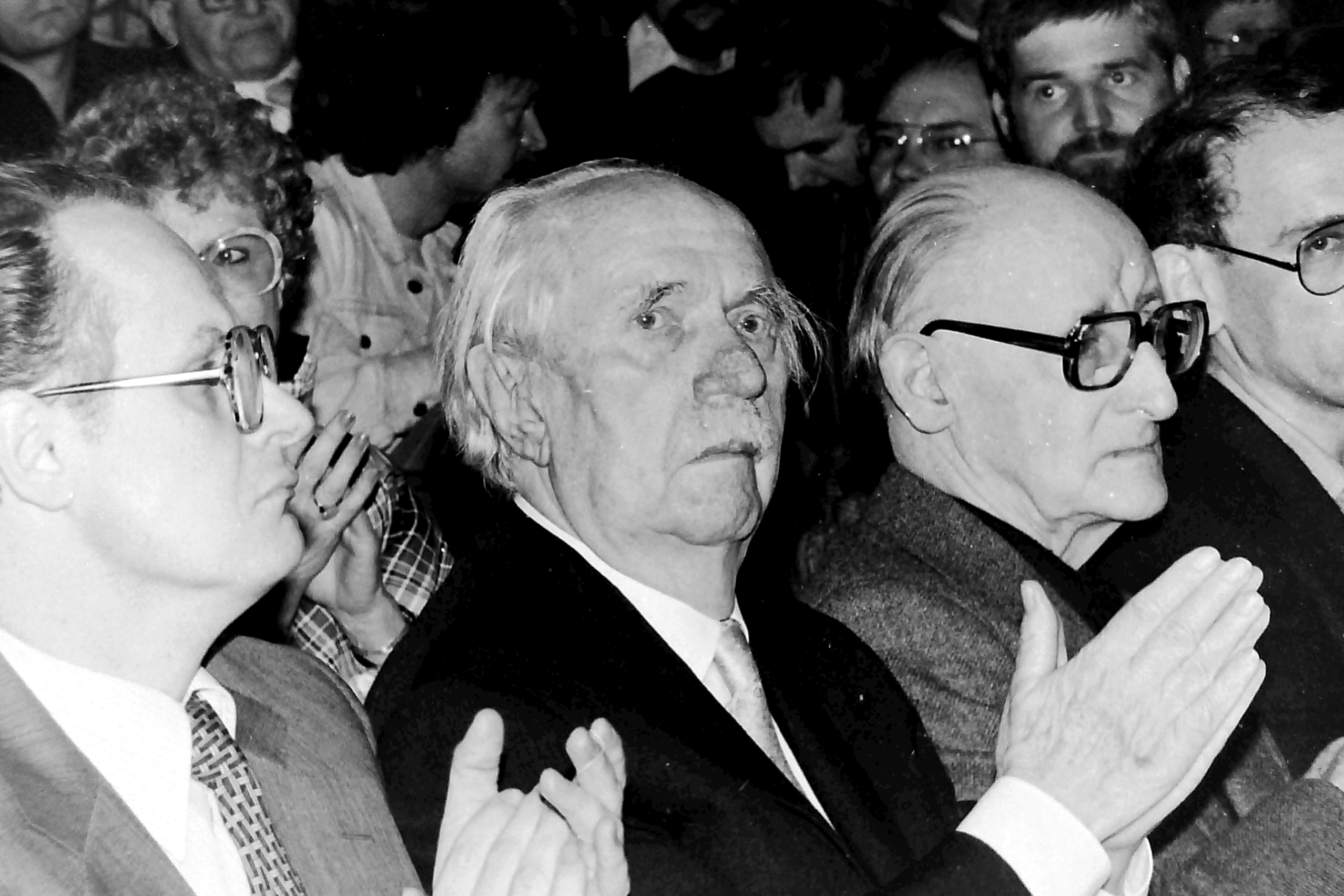
- Eberhard at the award ceremony of the Carl von Ossietzky Medal, 1979
- Born: Adolf Arthur Egon Hellmuth Freiherr von Rauschenplat; 2 October 1896; Dresden, Kingdom of Saxony, German Empire
- Died: 30 March 1982 (aged 85); Berlin
- Education: University of Tübingen
- Occupation: Journalist
- Writing career
- Notable works: How to Conquer Hitler: A Plan of Economic and Moral Warfare on the Nazi Home Front

Fritz Eberhard (2 October 1896 – 30 March 1982) was a German journalist, anti-fascist and social democrat and fought in the German Resistance against Nazism. He was a member of the Internationaler Sozialistischer Kampfbund (ISK). After the war, Eberhard was a member of the Parliamentary Council, precursor of the Bundestag, where he was one of the founders of the modern German constitution.

== Early years ==
Eberhard was born Helmut (or Hellmut) von Rauschenplat, a noble family in Dresden that dated back to the Middle Ages. In 1914, he began studying political science and economics, attending universities in Frankfurt am Main, Heidelberg und Tübingen. Taking three years off, from 1915 to 1918, to serve in World War I, he received his doctorate in 1920. During this time, he developed his social and political ideas and became an adherent of the ideas of Robert Wilbrandt and Leonard Nelson. In 1921, he joined the Internationaler Jugendbund, the forerunner of the ISK. He also joined the SPD in 1922 and the Jungsozialisten, but withdrew from the SPD in 1924. He also taught economics at the ISK school, Walkemühle in Melsungen. He worked as an editor for the ISK newspaper, Der Funke, where from 1932–1933, he was responsible for covering economic politics.

== Resistance and exile ==
After the Nazi Party seized power in 1933, Rauschenplat was forced to go underground because of an arrest warrant and took the name "Fritz Eberhard". He began heading up the banned ISK in Germany in 1934 and worked on building an independent socialist trade union, the Unabhängigen Sozialistischen Gewerkschaft. He also worked closely with Hans Jahn and the railroad Resistance group organized by the International Transport Workers' Federation and he maintained contact with the Willi Eichler and the exiled ISK leadership in London. During this period, he also wrote articles under a pseudonym for the Stuttgarter Sonntagszeitung until it was banned in 1937. The underground organization of the ISK was crushed by the Gestapo in 1937. Eberhard was able to flee to London, but fell into conflict with Eichler over his advocacy of direct action against Nazi Germany. As a result, he left the ISK in 1939, along with Hilde Meisel and Hans Lehnert. Following his split, he worked closely with Waldemar von Knoeringen and Richard Löwenthal and with the Sender der europäischen Revolution. He also worked as a journalist for several newspapers.

== Return to Germany ==
In April 1945, Eberhard was able to return to Germany, with the help of the Office of Strategic Services. He became a commentator and advisor to the American program director at Radio Stuttgart. In October, he re-joined the SPD and in 1946, he was elected to the Württemberg-Baden Landtag. In 1948-1949, he was a member of the Parlamentarischer Rat, the Parliamentary Council that was involved in writing the postwar constitution. Eberhard played a leading role in ensuring the right to conscientious objector status be included in the new laws of the Federal Republic of Germany. From 1949 to 1958, he worked at Süddeutscher Rundfunk as political director. From 1961 to 1968, he was the director and an honorary professor at the Institut für Publizistik at the Freie Universität Berlin. In 1979, Eberhard and Axel Eggebrecht were awarded the Carl von Ossietzky Medal.

Eberhard died in Berlin on 30 March 1982. His personal papers are at the archives of the Institute of Contemporary History in Munich.

== Works by Eberhard ==
Between 1934 and 1939, Eberhard published 71 articles in Sozialistische Warte with the pen name, Fritz Kempf or the abbreviation, F.K. In 1939, he wrote How to Conquer Hitler with Hilda Monte.
