= Gerhard Weisser =

German politician (1898–1989)

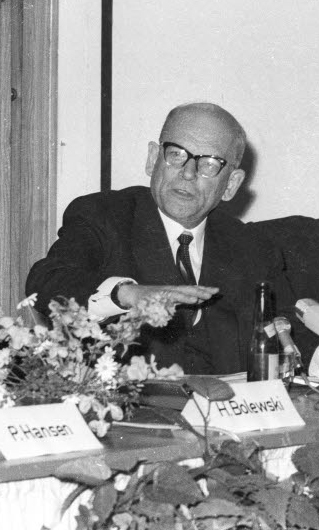
- Gerhard Weisser in 1965
- Born: 9 February 1898; Lissa, Province of Posen, Prussia
- Died: 25 October 1989 (aged 91); Bonn, West Germany
- Occupations: Social scientist, co-architect of post-war SPD
- Political party: SPD
- Spouse: Gerda von Dresier und Scharfenstein
- Children: 4

Gerhard Weisser (9 February 1898 – 25 October 1989) was a social scientist, university teacher, Social Democrat and expert policy advisor. He was one of the founding fathers of the Godesberg Program which in 1959 relaunched the political centre-left in West Germany.

His academic work is closely associated with the so-called Lebenslage concept and not-for-profit housing.

== Life ==
=== Growing up ===
Gerhard Weisser was born shortly before the end of the nineteenth century in Lissa, a mid-sized town in the Prussian Province of Posen. His father, Rudolf Weisser, was a district court official. He attended the Humanistisches Gymnasium (secondary school) in Magdeburg, passing his School final exams in 1917. While at school, he became a member of the Wandervogel youth organisation. On leaving school, he was conscripted into the army, but was released after a year when the war ended towards the end of 1918. He was released back into civilian life on 4 January 1919.

He now moved into Göttingen where he studied social and economic sciences. He also worked intensively on philosophical aspects, initially coming under the influence of the Neo-Kantians surrounding the charismatic Leonard Nelson, with whom, by the end of his time at Göttingen, Weisser would break decisively, reflecting both philosophical and personal differences between the two of them. He received high marks for his doctorate in 1923 for work on the theme of "Economic Policy as Science" ("Wirtschaftspolitik als Wissenschaft").

=== Early years ===
In 1923 Weisser took a post as a research assistant with the city council in Magdeburg. He was quickly promoted, becoming a deputy head of the city housing department. He was promoted again in 1927 when he became the Financial Director for the Municipal Executive ("Magistrat"). It was while he was working for the city council that he married on 7 July 1924. He had known his wife Gerda, who was the daughter of a highly decorated military officer (Hermann von Dresler und Scharfenstein), since their time together in the Wandervogel youth organisation.

It was also during this period that he joined the Social Democratic Party: in 1930 he was elected mayor of Hagen, an industrial city in the west of the country. He was relieved of his office under the provisions of Paragraph 4 in the new Law for the Restoration of the Professional Civil Service ("Gesetz zur Wiederherstellung des Berufsbeamtentums") during 1933, after the Nazis took power and converted the German state into a one-party dictatorship. As a Social Democrat, Gerhard Weisser was a member of the "wrong" party. During the twelve Nazi years he worked for a succession of publishing businesses, at one stage employed as the Chief Executive Officer (Geschäftsführer) of Otto Schwartz & Co in Göttingen.

The doctorate he had received in 1923 had pointed the way for a future academic career, and after an unusually varied career in public service, local politics, and the private sector, Weisser returned to the academic world, obtaining a habilitation (higher academic qualification) from Rostock University in 1943 for a piece of work which was published only six years later, in 1949, under the title "Structure and nature of individual economies. Theory and strategy of their approaches" ("Form und Wesen der Einzelwirtschaften. Theorie und Politik ihrer Stile"). His qualification was not accompanied by a teaching permit. Two years later, on 19 February 1945, he submitted an application for a teaching position covering what had become a speciality, "Housing economics and community structures" ("Wohnungswirtschaft und Genossenschaftswesen"), but was turned down due to the war.

=== After the war ===
War ended in May 1945 and Weisser immediately took on the leadership of the regional finance end economics ministry in what was then the state of Braunschweig, most of which had ended up in the British occupation zone. On 6 March 1946, now based in Hamburg, he was elected General Secretary of the administrative advisory board ("Zonenbeirat") for the British zone. Later that year he became President of the General Association of communal housing development, a position he held on an honorary (unpaid) basis. In the meantime, still in the British occupation zone, between 1948 and 1950 he was Secretary of State in the Finance Ministry for North Rhine-Westphalia.

Directly after the war, Weisser gave particular focus to monetary and currency matters. He was invited to participate in the meetings of the SPD (party) economic policy committee, chaired by Herbert Kriedemann. The committee worked rapidly, and within it Weisser played a leading role in producing what became the detailed party manifesto proposal, presented at Hanover to the crisis-wracked first postwar SPD party conference in May 1946.

=== Cologne university ===
In 1950, Weisser finally accepted an academic post, becoming Professor for Social Policy and Communal Methods ("Sozialpolitik und Genossenschaftswesen") at Cologne. Between 1954 and 1970 he also served as chairman of the Friedrich Ebert Foundation which had been relaunched after the war. Following his retirement from this post, he would remain honorary president till his death. During the 1950s, he was also working for the SPD Basic Values Commission ("der SPD-Grundwertekommission") and precursor programme commissions to the Godesberg Program, of which at least one source describes him as the "spiritual father".

=== Active retirement ===
Weisser retired in 1966 and went back to Göttingen, where he taught as an honorary professor. In the same year, jointly with Friedrich Karrenberg, he founded at Bochum the Research Institute for Social Policy and Social Sciences Consultancy ("Forschungsinstitut für Gesellschaftspolitik und beratende Sozialwissenschaft e.V." - but subsequently renamed), becoming its Research Director.

== Themes ==
=== The Life situation concept (das Lebenslagenkonzept) ===
Weisser's socio-political ideas started from the "Life situation premise". According to Weisser, a Life situation was based not simply on socio-economic variables such as income, education, size of residence, etc. The important things for him were the quality of the opportunities, individually or at a group level, that could lead to well-being. In this context he thought explicitly of the weak and those most at risk in society and the socially disadvantaged, who should not be dependent on handouts or state welfare, but for whom greatly enhanced legal and participation rights should be made available. The Life situation concept was influential, notably in West German social welfare legislation.

For Weisser, Social policy was a very broad concept, and he himself often preferred the term Society Policy ("Gesellschaftspolitik"), which he elaborated as the "expression of a system of practical Society Policy". Ensuring a free and just society was, for Weisser, only thinkable where sociological organisation and sociological teaching operate together. In this respect, he must also be seen as an educator. In short, Weisser's theory of "Society Policy" is probably best identified as a "theory on the distribution of life situations" (eine "Theorie der Verteilung von Lebenslagen").

=== Freedom socialism (freiheitlicher Sozialismus) ===
Within the framework of both his research work and his social democratic political engagement, a large part of Weisser's published output deals with re-inventing and developing concepts of free democratic socialism. He insisted that free democratic socialism was an attainable "third way" between communism and capitalism. For him, the point was to increase freedom by delivering socialism, notably through shared decision-making, the free social economy and ownership policy. Within the SPD, he stood for the downplaying of rigid Marxist precepts, instead placing emphasis on acknowledgement of fundamental values such as solidarity and freedom.

=== Knowledge theory ===
Ever since his student days, Weisser took a close interest in questions involving knowledge theory and inductive reasoning, primarily of a normative nature. He was much influenced by Jakob Friedrich Fries and his post-Kantian philosophy. Over the years, Weisser increasingly distanced himself from the approach of his old teacher, Leonard Nelson.

== Awards and honours ==
- 1968 Order of Merit of the Federal Republic of Germany with Star
- 1983 Honorary doctorate Social Sciences faculty Ruhr University Bochum
