= Leonard Nelson =

German philosopher and mathematician (1882–1927)

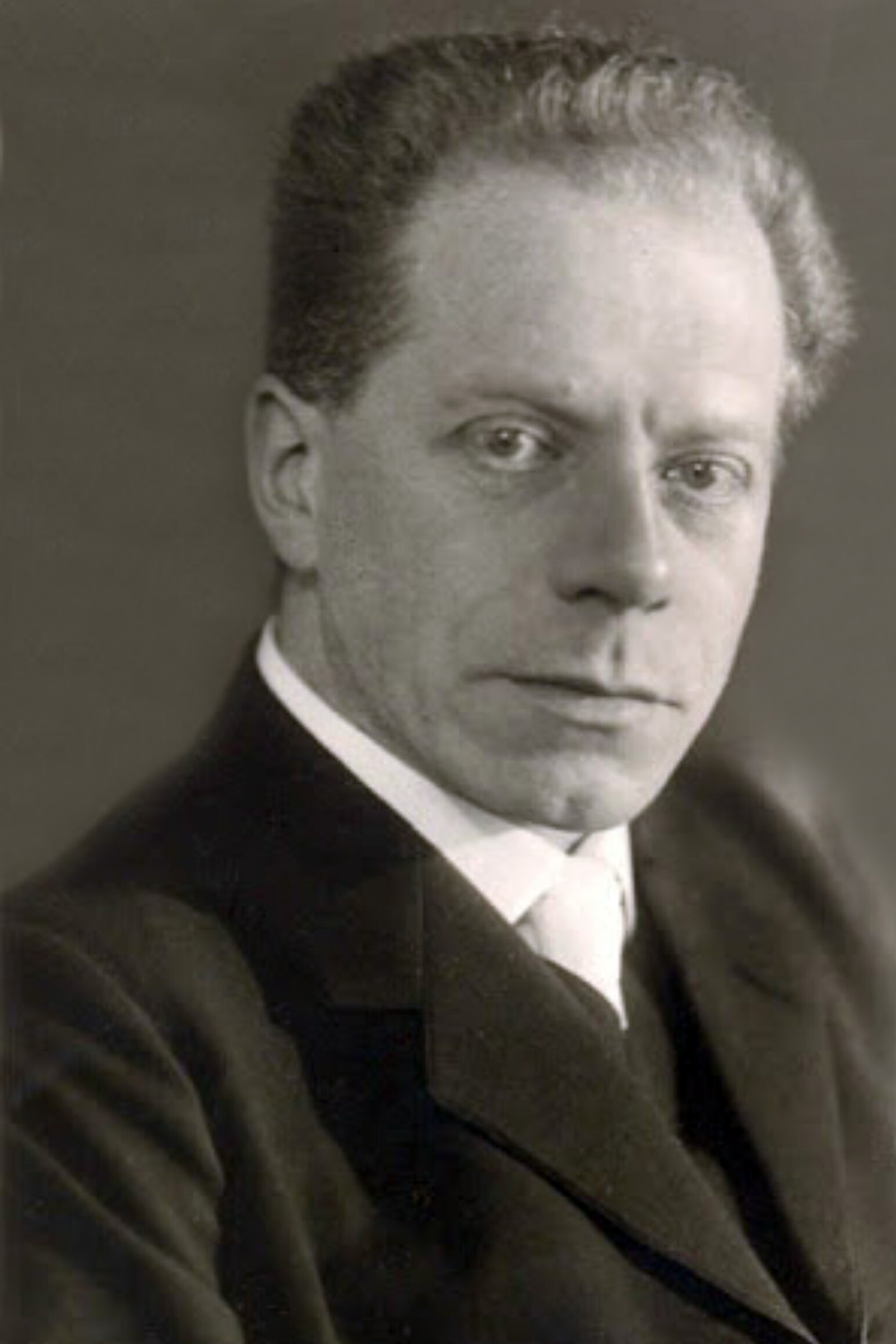
- Portrait, 1922
- Born: 11 July 1882; Berlin, German Empire
- Died: 29 October 1927 (aged 45); Göttingen, Germany
- Spouse: Elisabeth Schemmann (m. 1907; div. 1912)

Education
- Education: Französisches Gymnasium Berlin; Heidelberg University; Humboldt University of Berlin; University of Göttingen (PhD, 1904; Dr. phil. hab., 1909)
- Thesis: Jakob Friedrich Fries und seine jüngsten Kritiker (1904)
- Doctoral advisor: Julius Baumann

Philosophical work
- Era: 20th-century philosophy
- Region: Western philosophy
- School: Neo-Kantianism (neo-Friesian)
- Institutions: University of Göttingen
- Notable students: Paul Bernays, Gustav Heckmann, Gerhard Weisser, Fritz Eberhard, Alfred Kubel, Willi Eichler, Grete Hermann, Minna Specht
- Main interests: Critical philosophy, philosophy of science, logic
- Notable ideas: Grelling–Nelson paradox, revival of the Socratic method

Leonard Nelson (/ˈnɛlsən/; German: [ˈnɛlzɔn]; 11 July 1882 – 29 October 1927), sometimes spelt Leonhard, was a German mathematician, critical philosopher, and socialist. He was part of the neo-Friesian school (named after post-Kantian philosopher Jakob Friedrich Fries) of neo-Kantianism and a friend of the mathematician David Hilbert. He devised the Grelling–Nelson paradox in 1908 and the related idea of autological words with Kurt Grelling.

Nelson subsequently became influential in both philosophy and mathematics, as his close contacts with scientists and mathematicians influenced their ideas. Despite dying earlier than many of his friends and assistants, his ISK organization lived on after his death, even after being banned by the Nazi Regime in 1933. It is even claimed that Albert Einstein supported it. He's also credited with popularizing the Socratic method in his book Die sokratische Methode (The Socratic Method).

== Life ==
=== Early life and education ===
Leonard Nelson was the son of lawyer Heinrich Nelson and artist Elisabeth Lejeune Dirichlet. His mother was the granddaughter of mathematician Peter Gustav Lejeune Dirichlet and descendant of Jewish philosopher Moses Mendelssohn. Nelson was baptised as a Protestant at the age of five on 13 June 1887.

Nelson studied at Französisches Gymnasium Berlin, where mathematics and science were not a focus of the curriculum. He was therefore privately tutored by mathematician Gerhard Hessenberg (1874–1925), and began reading the works of philosophers Immanuel Kant, Jakob Friedrich Fries, and Ernst Friedrich Apelts, which began to spark his interest in philosophy.

In 1901, Nelson studied mathematics and philosophy at Heidelberg University for a short period of time before going to Friedrich Wilhelm University (today: Humboldt-Universität) in Berlin, from March 1901 to 1903. From 1903 to 1904, he worked with mathematicians and philosophers at the University of Göttingen, such as Julius Baumann (his doctoral advisor and a student of Hermann Lotze), David Hilbert, Felix Klein, Carl Runge, and his later rival Edmund Husserl.

Nelson's work as a philosopher was most concerned with critical philosophy, attributed to Kant. It sets out to find a "critique" on science and metaphysics, similar to empiricism, as things can only be true based on the perceptions and limitations on human minds. Kant's 1781 book Critique of Pure Reason (Kritik der reinen Vernunft) inspired Nelson to go down the path of critical philosophy, and later followed the works of post-Kantian philosopher Fries who had also followed Kant's work.

His first dissertation was Die kritische Methode und das Verhältnis der Psychologie zur Philosophie (The Critical Method and the Relationship of Psychology to Philosophy), which failed. His 1904 dissertation Jakob Fries and his Latest Critics (Jakob Friedrich Fries und seine jüngsten Kritiker) was successful. Nelson continued defending Fries' philosophy and ideas by publishing a neue Folge (new series) of Abhandlungen der Fries'schen Schule (1904) with Gerhard Hessenberg and mathematician Karl Kaiser. It was here that Nelson and these same friends created the Jakob-Friedrich-Fries-Gesellschaft (Jakob Friedrich Fries Society) to promote critical philosophy.

=== Career ===
Ready to form new ideas, Nelson founded the Neo-Friesian School in 1903, with some well-known members, such as Rudolf Otto, philosopher (1869–1937), Gerhard Hessenberg, mathematician (1874–1925) and Otto Meyerhof. biochemist (1884–1951). Other notable people, such as philosopher Kurt Grelling and mathematician Richard Courant (student of Hilbert), joined after its foundation. A larger list of ISK members and similar can be seen in the list of Germans who resisted Nazism.

In 1909 he habilitated at the University of Göttingen and became Privatdozent. From June 1919 until his death on 29 October 1927 he was a professor in Göttingen.

In 1922, Nelson founded the Philosophisch-Politische Akademie (Philosophical-Political Academy or PPA) as a "Platonic Academy" and non-profit association, which was abandoned soon after the Nazis banned it, but re-established in 1949. It still stands today for political discussions between philosophers and politicians, and was supported financially by the Gesellschaft der Freunde der Philosophisch-Politischen Akademie (Society of Friends of the Philosophical-Political Academy or GFA). They started working with an education center called Landerziehungsheim Walkemühle, founded in 1921 by a support of Nelson, progressive teacher Ludwig Wunder (1878–1949). Although Wunder left it shortly after in 1924, educator and co-worker of Nelson, Minna Specht, took over, with the help of journalist and author Mary Saran.

==== Internationaler Sozialistischer Kampfbund (ISK) ====
In 1917 Nelson and Minna Specht founded the Internationaler Jugendbund (International Youth Federation or IJB). In 1918, Nelson briefly became a member of the Independent Social Democratic Party (USPD), and from 1923 to 1925 he was a member of the Social Democratic Party (SPD), until he was ultimately excluded. As a result, in 1925, he and Minna Specht founded the Internationaler Sozialistischer Kampfbund ('SK; "International Socialist Militant League") merging it with the IJB by taking over its publishing label, Öffentliches Leben. Among Leonard Nelson's students and political companions in the International Socialist Kampfbund were also Prime Minister Alfred Kubel (1909–1999) and journalist Fritz Eberhard (1896–1982), later member of the Parlamentarischer Rat.

=== Animal rights and vegetarianism ===
Nelson was an early advocate of animal rights and a vegetarian. His lecture "Duties to Animals" was published posthumously in Germany in 1932 and included in his book A System of Ethics (translated in 1956) and reprinted in the 1972 book Animals, Men and Morals.

=== Personal life ===
Nelson married Elisabeth Schemmann (1884–1954), in 1907, but divorced in 1912 after she baptised their son Gerhard David Wilhelm Nelson (1909–1944) in the Lutheran Church. Nelson's refusal to baptise his son and divorce was a big change based on his Jewish ancestry. He even resigned from the Evangelical Church in 1919.

His wife married Paul Hensel (Nelson's third cousin) in 1917.

Nelson was an insomniac and died at a young age from pneumonia, and was buried at a Jewish cemetery in Melsungen alongside his father Heinrich.

== Posthumous legacy ==
Nelson's ideas continued to have an impact upon German socialism and communism in Nazi Germany as the ISK's members became active in the left-wing resistance to Nazism.

== Bibliography ==
Nelson published numerous books and papers, often with the help of other philosophers and mathematicians. He was later critical of G. W. F. Hegel in his work Progress and Regress in Philosophy (Fortschritte und Rückschritte der Philosophie). He is also known for defending the idea of animal rights in his work System of Philosophical Ethics and Pedagogy (System der philosophischen Ethik und Pädagogik) published in 1932, with the help of his assistant Grete Hermann (also part of the ISK) and Minna Specht.

Some of his works are already mentioned above, but some others, available in the Internet Archive (and other websites, if not available there), include:

=== Published works ===
- 1908 – Ist metaphysikfreie Naturwissenschaft möglich?, special edition of Abhandlungen der Fries’schen Schule, II. Bd., 3. Heft. Vandenhoeck & Ruprecht, Göttingen 1908 Internet Archive
- 1908 – Über das sogenannte Erkenntnisproblem. Vandenhoeck & Ruprecht, Göttingen 1908 Internet Archive
- 1908 – Über wissenschaftliche und ästhetische Naturbetrachtung. Vandenhoeck & Ruprecht, Göttingen 1908 Internet Archive
- Ethische Methodenlehre. by Veit & Comp., Leipzig 1915Internet Archive
- 1917 – Die Rechtswissenschaft ohne Recht: kritische Betrachtungen über die Grundlagen des Staats- und Völkerrechts insbesondere über die Lehre von der Souveränität. Veit & Comp, Leipzig 1917 Internet Archive
- 1917 – Vorlesungen über die Grundlagen der Ethik. Veit & Comp., Leipzig
  - Bd. 1: Kritik der praktischen Vernunft. 1917 Internet Archive. Translated to English by Norbert Guterman as Critique of practical reason, Leonard Nelson Foundation, 1957.
- Die sokratische Methode. Vortrag, gehalten am 11. Dezember 1922 in der Pädagogischen Gesellschaft in Göttingen. In: Abhandlungen der Fries’schen Schule. Neue Folge.Hrsg. v. Otto Meyerhof, Franz Oppenheimer, Minna Specht. 5. Band, H. 1. Öffentliches Leben, Göttingen 1929, S. 21–78.
- 1919 – Demokratie und Führerschaft, Public life, Berlin 1932. Internet Archive
- 1920 – System der philosophischen Rechtslehre. Verlag der Neue Geist / Reinhold, Leipzig 1920 Internet Archive
- 1922 – Die Reformation der Gesinnung: durch Erziehung zum Selbstvertrauen. The New Publishes, Leipzig 1922 Internet Archive
- 1922 – Die sokratische Methode, Lecture, held on December 11, 1922 in the Pedagogical Society in Göttingen. In: Treatises of the Friesian school. New episode. edited by Otto Meyerhof, Franz Oppenheimer, Minna Specht. 5th volume, Göttingen 1929, pp. 21–78. Internet Archive
- Ausgewählte Schriften. Studienausgabe. Hrsg. und eingeleitet von Heinz-Joachim Heydorn. Europäische Verlagsanstalt, Frankfurt 1974.
- Vom Selbstvertrauen der Vernunft: Schriften zur krit. Philosophie und ihrer Ethik. Hrsg. von Grete Henry-Hermann (Philosophische Bibliothek. Band 288). Meiner, Hamburg 1975.
- 2011 – Typische Denkfehler in der Philosophie. Felix Meiner Verlag. April 2011. ISBN 978-3787321490., a series of lectures, delivered from April to July 1921 that was omitted from his collected works. English translation A Theory of Philosophical Fallacies. Translated by Leal, Fernando; Carus, David. Springer. 2016. ISBN 978-3-319-20782-7.

=== Gesammelte Schriften in neun Bänden ===
English translation: "Collected Writings in Nine Volumes". It was published by Paul Bernays and Felix Meiner Verlag (a German scientific publishing house in philosophy), in Hamburg 1970-1977;

- Volume I: Die Schule der kritischen Philosophie und ihre Methode
- Volume II: Geschichte und Kritik der Erkenntnistheorie
- Volume III: Die kritische Methode in ihrer Bedeutung für die Wissenschaft
- Volume IV: Kritik der praktischen Vernunft
- Volume V: System der philosophischen Ethik und Pädagogik
- Volume VI: System der philosophischen Rechtslehre und Politik
- Volume VII: Fortschritte und Rückschritte der Philosophie von Hume und Kant bis Hegel und Fries
- Volume VIII: Sittlichkeit und Bildung
- Volume IX: Recht und Staat
