= Paul Oestreich =

German educator

Paul Hermann August Oestreich (30 March 1878 – 28 February 1959) was a German educator and pedagogue.

== Early life ==
Oestreich was born in Kolberg, within the German Empire's Prussian Province of Pomerania. He studied mathematics, philosophy, pedagogy, and new languages at the universities of Berlin and Greifswald from 1896 to 1900.

== Career ==
In Berlin-Schöneberg, Oestreich was a teacher from 1901 and a Studienrat from 1905. He joined the National-Social Association and the Liberals Association to Friedrich Naumann, which he represented 1906–08 in the Berlin City Council, then the Democratic Union. He became a member of the "Federal New Fatherland", and later, in 1921–26, he was a board member of the "German Peace Society". From 1918 till 1931 he was a member of the SPD.

In 1919, Oestreich founded the Bund Entschiedener Schulreformer (BESch) and led it until 1933. After the Second World War, Oestirch joined the Communist Party of Germany and later the Socialist Unity Party.

From 1945-1949, Oestreich was Hauptschulrat in Berlin-Zehlendorf. From 1949 to 1950 he worked in the Hauptschulamt of the Magistrat of Groß-Berlin Dezernent for higher education. In 1949 he became a head of the 29 higher schools in east Berlin.

In autumn of 1954 he received the award "Verdienter Lehrer des Volkes" by the Soviet Council of Ministers.

Paul-Oestreich-Straße is a street named after Oestreich in Berlin-Weißensee.

== Works ==
- An editor of the Neue Erziehung (bulletin of the Bund Entschiedener Schulreformer)
- Die Produktionsschule, 1920
- Die Einheitsschule als Schule der Menschenbildung, 1920;
- Die elastische Einheitsschule, 1921
- Die Produktionsschule als Nothaus und Neubau, 1924;
- Der neue Lehrer, 1926 (with O. Tacke);
- Erziehung zur Liebe, 1930 (with E. Dehmel);
- Der Einbruch der Technik in die Pädagogik, 1930;
- Hat dieser Wettbewerb einen Sinn, 1931 (with A. Horschitz)
- Die Technik als Luzifer der Pädagogik, 1947
- Die Schule zur Volkskultur, 1947

== See also ==
- List of peace activists
