= Critical philosophy =

Philosophical movement

Critical philosophy (German: kritische Philosophie) is a movement inaugurated by Immanuel Kant (1724–1804). It is dedicated to the self-examination of reason with the aim of exposing its inherent limitations, that is, to defining the possibilities of knowledge as a prerequisite to advancing to knowledge itself. According to Kant, only after such self-criticism does it become possible to develop metaphysics in a non-dogmatic way.

The three critical texts of the Kantian corpus are the Critique of Pure Reason, Critique of Practical Reason and Critique of Judgement, published between 1781 and 1790 and primarily concerned, respectively, with metaphysics, morality, and teleology.

Contemporaries of Kant such as Johann Georg Hamann and Johann Gottfried Herder rejected the notion of "pure" reason upon which this project depends. They claim that reason depends upon language, which always introduces historical contingencies.

20th-century proponents include Léon Brunschvicg and Charles Bernard Renouvier.

== See also ==
- Critical idealism
- Critical thinking
- German idealism
- Neo-Kantianism
- Speculative philosophy

== Sources ==
- Stanford Encyclopedia of Philosophy: Immanuel Kant
