= Der Funke =

German socialist newspaper (1932–33)

- Editor-in-chief: Willi Eichler
- Founded: January 1932
- Ceased publication: February 1933
- Political alignment: Internationaler Sozialistischer Kampfbund
- Language: German
- Headquarters: Insel Strasse, Berlin
- City: Berlin

Der Funke (German: [deːɐ̯ ˈfʊŋkə], English: The Spark) was a daily newspaper published from Berlin, Germany, from 1932 to 1933. It was the national publication of the Internationaler Sozialistischer Kampfbund (ISK). The ISK leader Willi Eichler was the editor-in-chief of Der Funke. It carried the slogan "Der Funke, Daily Paper for Rights, Freedom and Culture". Der Funke argued for a united front against Nazism spanning from bourgeois liberals to communists.

Der Funke was founded in early January 1932. The newspaper was sold by ISK members at streets, coffee shops, bars and cultural events. Its office was located at Insel Strasse. Helmuth von Rauschenplat was the economics editor of the newspaper. Other people working with Der Funke included Grete Henry, Werner Hansen, Gustav Heckmann, and Ilse Barea-Kulcsar.

In its 24 June 1932 issue Der Funke published the "Urgent Call for Unity" ahead of the July 1932 Reichstag election. The appeal called for a defence of personal and political freedoms in Germany. The appeal argued for electoral unity between the Social Democratic Party of Germany (SPD) and the Communist Party of Germany (KPD) against Hitler. Signatories of the appeal included Albert Einstein, Käthe Kollwitz, Franz Oppenheimer, Arnold Zweig, Heinrich Mann and Erich Kästner. However, neither SPD nor KPD agreed to the proposal.

The newspaper was banned for four weeks in November and December 1932, following the publication of an editorial labelling president Paul von Hindenburg as the "Protector of Fascism". The newspaper was finally banned in February 1933.
