= Minna Specht =

German educator and resistance fighter

Minna Specht (22 December 1879 – 3 February 1961) was a German educator, socialist and member of the German Resistance. She was one of the founders of the Internationaler Sozialistischer Kampfbund.

== Early years ==
Minna Specht was born on 22 December 1879 in Schloss Reinbek, as the seventh child of Mathilde and Wilhelm Specht (d. 1882). The family lived in Reinbek castle, originally the hunting lodge in Friedrichsruh, which they acquired in 1874 and turned into a hotel. The approximately 70-room castle was only open in summer, during which the children lived with a nanny and a governess in one of two small houses next door. In 1882, following an accident, her father died, leaving the family in financial difficulties.

Specht's first schooling was in a small private school at the castle from 1884 to 1894 and at a girls' school in Bergedorf. She then attended a monastic school in Hamburg from 1896 to 1899, where she was trained as a teacher, the only career available to impoverished upper-class families. Her education was such, that Specht first applied for work as a governess. In 1902, she was invited to teach in a new girls' school in Hamburg, founded by a teacher from the monastic school she had attended. In this new job, she was given the freedom to decide her own curriculum and she discovered her love of teaching. She remained there until she went to university in 1906 in order to increase her qualifications and become an Oberlehrerin. For three years, she studied geography, history, geology and philosophy at the University of Göttingen and one or two semesters at the Ludwig-Maximilians-Universität München. In 1909, she returned to teach at the girls' school where she'd previously worked, staying until 1914.

== Returns to university ==
In 1914, at the age of 35, Specht returned to the University of Göttingen to study mathematics, finishing as an Oberlehrerin, certified to teach the higher grades. The following year, she met the philosopher Leonard Nelson, an acquaintance that changed her way of thinking and developed into a close working and personal relationship. Together, they founded the Internationaler Jugendbund, along with Max Hodann and his wife, Mary.

Specht worked for a short while with Hermann Lietz at his Haubinda progressive boarding school, In 1922, she went to Walkemühle, a progressive boarding school in Melsungen near Kassel, founded by Nelson. She then ran the school until 1931, when she went to Berlin to work as the editor of the ISK's newspaper, Der Funke. After Nelson's death in 1927, she ran the Internationaler Sozialistischer Kampfbund (ISK) with Willi Eichler. In 1932, she was one of the 33 signatories of the ISK's Dringender Appell, which called for a united front of communists and socialists in the fight against National Socialism. Well-known artists, scientists and politicians who signed the appeal included Käthe Kollwitz, Albert Einstein, Erich Kästner and Erich Zeigner. Specht returned to Walkemühle in March 1933, as it was occupied by the SA. The school was confiscated in May 1933.

== Exile and return ==
In 1933, Specht fled Germany with the Walkenmühle pupils, most of whom were children of socialist or Jewish parents and went to Denmark, where she established a school for the children of German émigrés. In November 1938, she immigrated to Wales and was interned as an enemy alien on the Isle of Man from 1940 to 1941. Her public opposition to the Nazis provided evidence that led to her release after one year. After her release, she worked in London on political re-education for a Nazi-free Germany, developing a concept based on the needs of youth who had been raised with Nazism and shattered by war. In fall 1945, she was the only German invited to an international conference in Zurich on children shattered by war. There, she met the founders of the Odenwaldschule, Edith and Paul Geheeb, who decided to ask her to head up the school, which they had had to abandon in 1934.

Specht returned to Germany and ran the Odenwaldschule, from 1946 through 1951. Specht was a member of the German Commission for UNESCO. In 1952, she began working with Professor Dr. Walther Merck at the UNESCO-Instituts für Pädagogik in Hamburg. She was also an inspector of boarding schools. In 1955, she was awarded the Goethe Plaque for Training and Education for her service in educational science theory and practice.

Specht died on 3 February 1961 in Bremen, aged 81.

== Legacy ==
Specht's personal papers are located at the Friedrich Ebert Foundation in Bonn, in the Archive of Social Democracy. The collection contains extensive correspondence, files, records on the history of Walkemühle, the schools in Denmark and England, manuscripts and Specht's published writings on education and politics. There are also photo albums.

There is a school in Frankfurt am Main named for Minna Specht.

== Selected works ==
- Jakob Friedrich Fries. Der Begründer unserer politischen Weltansicht, Verlag Öffentliches Leben, Stuttgart (1927) (in German)
- Vom Sinn der Jugendweihe, Verlag Öffentliches Leben, Göttingen (1930) (in German)
- Education in post-war Germany, International Publishing Company, London (1944)
- Re-making Germany, by Mary Saran, Willi Eichler, Wilhelm Heidorn, Minna Specht. Preface by James Griffiths. Published on behalf of the Socialist Vanguard Group, International Publishing Company, London (1945)
- Kindernöte, edited with Martha Friedländer. Verlag Öffentliches Leben, Frankfurt am Main (1950) (in German)
- Leonard Nelson. Zum Gedächtnis, Verlag Öffentliches Leben, Frankfurt am Main (1953) (in German)
