= Willi Eichler =

German journalist and politician (1896–1971)

Member of the Bundestag
- In office 7 September 1949 – 7 September 1953

Personal details
- Born: 7 January 1896 Berlin, Kingdom of Prussia, German Empire
- Died: 17 October 1971 (aged 75) Bonn, West Germany
- Party: SPD

Willi Eichler (7 January 1896 – 17 October 1971) was a German journalist and politician with the Social Democratic Party of Germany (SPD).

== Before 1945 ==
Eichler was born in Berlin, the son of a postal worker. He attended Volksschule and then became a clerk. Between 1915 and 1918, he served as a soldier in the First World War.

In 1922, he went to work as the secretary of the socialist philosopher, Leonard Nelson, who founded the Internationaler Sozialistischer Kampfbund (ISK). He became a close confidant of Nelson. In 1923, he joined the SPD, but remained a follower of Nelson and became a member of the ISK. After Nelson's death in 1927, Eichler became chairman of the ISK.

From 1932 to 1933, he was the editor-in-chief of the ISK's anti-Nazi newspaper, Der Funke, which published an "Urgent Call for Unity" in June 1932 calling for support of the SPD and the KPD in the July 1932 German federal election. It was signed by 33 well-known scientists, authors and artists, including Albert Einstein, Emil Julius Gumbel, Kurt Hiller, Erich Kästner, Käthe Kollwitz / Arthur Kronfeld, Heinrich Mann, Pietro Nenni, Paul Oestreich, Franz Oppenheimer, Theodor Plivier, Minna Specht, Helene Stöcker, Ernst Toller, Erich Zeigner and Arnold Zweig.

Eichler emigrated to France in 1933 after the National Socialists seized power. In Paris, he got involved with the Lutetia Circle, the 1935-1936 attempt of exiles to establish and support a Volksfront against the Third Reich. He also became publisher of the Reinhart Briefe, which were secretly disseminated in Germany, and the Socialistische Warte, which published articles by Hilde Meisel.

Eichler's political activities caused him to be expelled from France in 1938. Shortly before the outbreak of war, Eichler found asylum in England, where he returned to the SPD. In London, Eichler worked at the BBC making broadcasts aimed at German workers and published Europe Speaks. In 1941, he was a founding member and board member of the Union deutscher sozialistischer Organisationen in Großbritannien, which, after the war, merged with the SPD. Toward the end of his exile in London, he worked closely with historian Susanne Miller, a German Jewish refugee, who later became his wife.

== Postwar ==
Eichler returned to Germany in 1946 and got involved rebuilding the SPD. He founded the magazine Geist und Tat, which he edited till his death in 1971. Until 1951, he also worked as editor-in-chief of the SPD newspaper, the Rheinische Zeitung.

Eichler was a member of the SPD executive committee from 1946–1968, chairman of the Middle Rhine district of the SPD from 1947–1953, a member of the North Rhine-Westphalian Landtag from 1947–1948 and a member of the Bundestag from 1949 to 1953. He also served as a member of the Zonenbeirat, the advisory committee to the British occupied zone.

In 1948 and 1949, Eichler was a member of the Wirtschaftsrat des Vereinigten Wirtschaftsgebietes, an economic advisory council of the Bizone. While serving in the Bundestag in the early 1950s, Eichler was the vice chairman of the Committee on the Press, Radio and Film. During the period after the war, Eichler was one of the leading theoreticians in his party and was the chairman of the decision-making commission to prepare for the Godesberg Program.

Later, Eichler served as a member of the executive board of the Friedrich Ebert Foundation. Eichler died in Bonn in 1971.

== Works by Eichler ==
Between 1934 and 1948, Eichler wrote numerous articles under various pen names, including Martin Hart, H. M., Walter Buchholz, Walter Holz and Ernst Friesius. He had two articles in Das Andere Deutschland and over 360 articles in the Sozialistische Warte. Eichler wrote Das Parlament als Repräsentant der Öffentlichkeit im Rundfunk, which appeared in Die Freiheit des Rundfunks, published in Munich in 1956.

== Bibliography ==
- Sabine Lemke-Müller: Ethischer Sozialismus und soziale Demokratie. Der politische Weg Willi Eichlers vom ISK zur SPD. Bonn 1988 ISBN 3-87831-459-0
