= Internationaler Sozialistischer Kampfbund =

International Socialist Militant League Internationaler Sozialistischer Kampfbund
- Abbreviation: ISK
- Founders: Leonard Nelson; Minna Specht
- Founded: 1925
- Dissolved: 1945
- Split from: Social Democratic Party of Germany
- Merged into: Social Democratic Party of Germany
- Ideology: Ethical socialism Anti-clericalism; Anti-Marxism
- Political position: Left-wing

The Internationaler Sozialistischer Kampfbund (German: [ɪntɐnatsjoˈnaːlɐ zotsjaˈlɪstɪʃɐ ˈkampfbʊnt], "International Socialist Militant League") or ISK was a socialist split-off from the SPD during the Weimar Republic and was active in the German Resistance against Nazism.

== History ==
The Internationaler Sozialistischer Kampfbund (ISK) was a political organization founded by Göttingen philosopher Leonard Nelson and educator Minna Specht. Nelson and Specht had previously founded the International Socialist Youth League (ISYL) in 1917, which was supported by Albert Einstein. Nelson, a neo-Kantian hochschule teacher, had long wanted to teach at a university and also work politically. He advocated a brand of socialism that was ethically motivated, anti-clerical and anti-Marxist, but also undemocratic and included strict vegetarianism and a defense of animal rights. Nelson decided to establish the ISK after members of the ISYL were expelled from the Communist Party in 1922 and the Social Democratic Party in 1925.

The ISK took over the ISYL's publishing label, Öffentliches Leben, which published the ISK newsletter beginning January 1, 1926. Beginning January 1929, an edition in Esperanto was added, and in April, a small circulation quarterly in English was added as well. It was usually eight pages and editions ran an average of 5,000 to 6,000 copies. Nelson moved his main published works there as well, his philosophical and political series Öffentliches Leben and his 1904 treatises, "Abhandlungen der Fries’schen Schule, Neue Folge", re-reasoned with mathematician Gerhard Hessenberg and physiologist Karl Kaiser, and which, after Nelson's death, was continued by Nobel Prize winner Otto Meyerhof, sociologist Franz Oppenheimer and Minna Specht until 1937.

With the growing electoral success of the Nazis at the end of the Weimar Republic, the ISK founded the newspaper, Der Funke to confront the situation. Of particular note was the "Urgent Call for Unity" (Dringender Appell für die Einheit) regarding the July 1932 federal election. It appeared in the newspaper and on placards all over Berlin. Calling for unity and support of the SPD and the KPD in order to thwart further gains by the Nazis, it was signed by 33 leading German intellectuals, including scientists Albert Einstein, Franz Oppenheimer, Emil Gumbel, Arthur Kronfeld, the artist Käthe Kollwitz, writers Kurt Hiller, Erich Kästner, Heinrich Mann, Ernst Toller and Arnold Zweig and many others.

The ISK continued to work in the resistance after the 1933 Nazi ban. The ISK had destroyed all written party records and until 1938, remained undetected, while the larger parties, the KPD and SPD, were being battered by massive arrests. The ISK was therefore able to continue its resistance work, helping political refugees leave the country, conducting sabotage and distributing leaflets. In 1938, however, a wave of arrests hit the ISK. A main focus of the work was the attempt to build a clandestine trade union, the Unabhängige Sozialistische Gewerkschaft ("Independent Socialist Union"), which also supported the International Transport Workers' Federation. The ISK's best known act of resistance was the sabotage of the opening of the Reichsautobahn on May 19, 1935. The night before Hitler's trip to inaugurate the new highway, ISK activists wrote anti-Hitler slogans, such as "Hitler = War" and "Down with Hitler", on all the bridges along the route between Frankfurt am Main and Darmstadt, where he was to travel. The Nazi propaganda film produced of the event had to be edited numerous times.

In exile, the ISK also published the Reinhart Briefe ("Reinhart Letters") and Sozialistische Warte, which were then smuggled into Germany. Because of their factual and unpolemical reporting, these were valued by various members of the German Resistance. The ISK was linked with the Socialist Vanguard Group in England and the Internationale Militante Socialiste in France.

== ISK members after 1945 ==
After World War II, the ISK was merged into the SPD on December 10, 1945 after talks between Willi Eichler, chairman of the ISK and Kurt Schumacher, then chairman of the SPD. Most of the former ISK members then joined the SPD.

One prominent member of the ISK, Ludwig Gehm, was later the national vice chairman of the Committee of Formerly Persecuted Social Democrats (Arbeitsgemeinschaft ehemals verfolgter Sozialdemokraten) and a Frankfurt am Main city council member from the SPD. Eichler, who was chairman of the ISK for many years, represented the SPD in the Bundestag from 1949 to 1953 and is considered one of the main authors of the Godesberg Program. Alfred Kubel was a member of the Lower Saxony state government for many years and was Ministerpräsident from 1970 to 1976. Hamburger ISK member Hellmut Kalbitzer was elected to the Bundestag several times, served in the Hamburg Bürgerschaft and from 1958 to 1962, was vice president of the European Parliament. Fritz Eberhard, who was in the ISK until 1939, was a member of the Parlamentarischer Rat ("Parliamentary Council") and was involved in writing the postwar constitution, including the right to conscientious objector status in the new laws of the Federal Republic of Germany.

Eichler also published a monthly magazine from 1946 until his death in 1971, Geist und Tat, which was devoted to "rights, freedom and culture" and he had a publishing house, Europäische Verlagsanstalt until the 1960s.

== Structure ==
The ISK never set out to amass a large membership, but rather to become an active and hard-hitting organization. Membership requirements for prospective candidates included adherence to a certain ethical socialism that were more stringent than for the major parties.

- Members were to abstain from nicotine, alcohol and meat, were to be absolutely punctual and orderly, and because of the anti-clerical position of the organization, withdrawal from church affiliation was mandatory
- Participation in a trade union, the ISK and the labor movement was general requirement for members (eliminating passive membership)
- Instead of a membership fee, there was a "Party tax," which all members with an income over 150 Reichsmarks had to pay

The ISK never had more than 300 members, largely because of the strict requirements for membership. These members were organized into 32 local groups. However, its political work involved sympathizers, between 600 and 1,000 in 1933. A survey in 1929 revealed that 85% of ISK members were under 35 years of age.

Chairmen of the ISK (formerly, the ISYL)

- 1922–1927, Leonard Nelson and Minna Specht
- 1927–1945, Willi Eichler and Minna Specht

From 1924 to 1933, the ISK (and its forerunner, the ISYL) maintained its rural school, the Walkemühle in the Adelshausen quarter of Melsungen, Hesse and from 1931 to 1933, its own newspaper, Der Funke, both of which were banned by the Nazis.

== See also ==
- List of Germans who resisted Nazism for other Germans in the ISK
- Socialist Vanguard Group, British affiliate of the ISK

== Bibliography ==
- Andreas Wilkens, Mit dem Leben bezahlt. Hilda Monte - eine Europäerin im Widerstand. Biografie, Berlin 2025 ISBN 978-3-86732-481-6.
- Hellmut Kalbitzer: Widerstehen und Mitgestalten. Ein Querdenker erinnert sich. Herausgegeben von Christiane Rix unter Mitarbeit von Thomas John. Hamburg 1997.
- Karl-Heinz Klär: Zwei Nelson-Bünde: Internationaler Jugend-Bund (IJB) und Internationaler Sozialistischer Kampf-Bund (ISK) im Licht neuer Quellen, in: IWK 18 (1982), H. 3, S. 310-360.
- Sabine Lemke-Müller: Ethischer Sozialismus und soziale Demokratie. Der politische Weg Willi Eichlers vom ISK zur SPD. Bonn 1988 ISBN 3-87831-459-0
- Sabine Lemke-Müller: Ethik des Widerstands. Der Kampf des Internationalen Sozialistischen Kampfbundes (ISK) gegen den Nationalsozialismus. Quellen und Texte zum Widerstand aus der Arbeiterbewegung 1933-1945, Bonn 1996.
- Werner Link: Die Geschichte des Internationalen Jugend-Bundes (IJB) und des Internationalen Sozialistischen Kampf-Bundes (ISK). Ein Beitrag zur Geschichte der Arbeiterbewegung in der Weimarer Republik und im Dritten Reich. Meisenheim/Gl. 1964.
- Heiner Lindner: „Um etwas zu erreichen, muss man sich etwas vornehmen, von dem man glaubt, dass es unmöglich sei“. Der Internationale Sozialistische Kampfbund (ISK) und seine Publikationen. Bonn 2006
