= Types of socialism =

Variations of the economic philosophy

Types of socialism include a range of economic and social systems characterized by social ownership and democratic control of the means of production and organizational self-management of enterprises, as well as the political theories and movements associated with socialism. As a term, socialism represents a broad range of theoretical and historical socioeconomic systems and has also been used by many political movements throughout history to describe themselves and their goals, thereby generating various varieties of socialism. In general, these varieties share a common element of social ownership, which refers to forms of public, collective, or cooperative ownership, or to citizen ownership of equity, in which surplus value is distributed among the working class and hence society as a whole. However, varieties of socialism differ in terms of attitudes toward economic regulatory systems, governmental structures, and revolutionary violence.

Socialist economic systems can be divided into market and non-market forms. The former utilizes markets to allocate inputs and capital goods among economic units. In the latter, planning is utilized along with a system of accounting based on calculation-in-kind to value resources and goods, wherein production is carried out directly for use.

There have been numerous political movements, such as anarchism, communism, the labour movement, Marxism, social democracy, and syndicalism, whose members called themselves socialists under some definition of the term. Some of these interpretations are mutually exclusive and all of them have generated debates over the true meaning of socialism. Different self-described socialists have used socialism to refer to different concepts, such as an economic system, a type of society, a philosophical outlook, a collection of moral values and ideals, or a certain kind of human character. Some definitions of socialism are very vague, while others are so specific that they include only a small minority of the things that have been described as socialism in the past, such as a mode of production, state socialism, or the abolition of wage labour.

== Early interpretations ==
The term socialism was coined in the 1830s and was first used to refer to philosophical, moral, or ethical beliefs concerning the promotion of broad social well-being, rather than any specific political views. Alexandre Vinet, who claimed to have been the first person to use the term, defined socialism simply as "the opposite of individualism". Robert Owen also viewed socialism as a matter of ethics, though he defined the term more specifically than Vinet, referring to the view that human society can and should be improved for the benefit of all. In a similar vein, Pierre-Joseph Proudhon described socialism as "every aspiration towards the amelioration of society".

In the first half of the 19th century, many writers who described themselves as socialists—and who would be later called utopian socialists—wrote descriptions of what they believed to be the ideal human society. Some of them created small communities that put their ideals into practice. A constant feature of these ideal societies was social and economic equality. Because the people who proposed the creation of such societies called themselves socialists, the term socialism came to refer not only to a certain moral doctrine, but also to a type of egalitarian society based on such a doctrine.

Other early advocates of socialism took a more scientific approach by favouring social levelling to create a meritocratic society based upon freedom for individual talent to prosper. For example, Count Henri de Saint-Simon was fascinated by the enormous potential of science and technology and believed a socialist society would eliminate the disorderly aspects of capitalism. He advocated the creation of a society in which each person was ranked according to his or her capacities and rewarded according to his or her work. The key focus of this early socialism was on administrative efficiency and industrialism and a belief that science was the key to progress. Simon's ideas provided a foundation for scientific economic planning and technocratic administration of society.

Other early socialist thinkers, such as Charles Hall and Thomas Hodgskin, based their ideas on David Ricardo's economic theories. They reasoned that the equilibrium value of commodities approximated prices charged by the producer when those commodities were in elastic supply, and that these producer prices corresponded to the cost of the labour—essentially the wages paid—that was required to produce the commodities. The Ricardian socialists viewed profit, interest, and rent as deductions from this exchange-value. These ideas embodied early conceptions of market socialism.

After the development of Karl Marx's theories, many socialist movements and writers adopted definitions of socialism centered on worker ownership or control of productive assets, either through state institutions, cooperatives, or other collective arrangements. In Marxist theory, socialism refers to a transitional stage between capitalism and communism characterized by coordinated production, collective ownership of productive assets, and the eventual reduction of class distinctions. Some other socialist traditions have defined socialism differently and do not necessarily share Marx's stage-based theory of historical development.

== Differences between various schools ==
Although they share a common root, schools of socialism are divided on many issues, sometimes even internally. The following is a brief overview of the major issues which have generated significant controversy among socialists in general.

=== Theory ===
Some branches of socialism arose largely as a philosophical construct (e.g. utopian socialism), while others arose in the course of a revolution (e.g. early Marxism or Leninism). A few arose as the product of a ruling party (e.g. Stalinism), others as the product of various worker movements (e.g. anarcho-syndicalism) or a party or other group contending for political power in a democratic society (e.g. social democracy).

Some are in favour of a socialist revolution (e.g. Maoism, Marxism–Leninism, revolutionary socialism, social anarchism and Trotskyism), while others tend to support reform instead (e.g. Fabianism and individualist anarchism).

All socialists criticize the current system in some way. Some criticisms centre on the ownership of the means of production (e.g. Marxism), whereas others tend to focus on the nature of mass and equitable distribution (e.g. most forms of utopian socialism). Most are opposed to unchecked industrialism as well as capitalism (e.g. green left) and believe that, under socialism, the environment must be protected. Utopian socialists such as Robert Owen and Henri de Saint-Simon argued that the injustice and widespread poverty of the societies they lived in were a problem of the distribution of the goods created. On the other hand, Marxian socialists argued that the primary source of economic injustice was the concentration of ownership of productive assets among a relatively small ownership class rather than the distribution of goods after production. Marxian socialists also maintain that the root of injustice is not in how commodities are distributed, but in whose economic benefit they are produced and sold.

=== Practice ===
Most forms and derivatives of Marxism have advocated total or near-total socialization of the economy. Less radical schools (e.g. reformism and reformist Marxism) proposed a mixed market economy instead. Mixed economies can range from those developed by the social democratic governments that have periodically governed Northern and Western European countries to the inclusion of small cooperatives in the planned economy of Yugoslavia. A related issue is whether it is better to reform capitalism to create a fairer society (e.g. most social democrats) or to totally overthrow the capitalist system (all Marxists).

Some schools advocate centralized state control of the socialized sectors of the economy (e.g. Leninism), while others argue for control of those sectors by workers' councils (e.g. anarchist communism, council communism, left communism, Marxism or syndicalism). This question is usually referred to by socialists in terms of "ownership of the means of production". Most contemporary European social democratic parties do not advocate comprehensive ownership of the means of production and generally support mixed-market economic systems.

Another issue socialists are divided on is what legal and political apparatus workers would maintain in order to further develop the socialization of the means of production. Some advocate that the power of workers' councils should constitute the basis of a socialist state (coupled with direct democracy and the widespread use of referendums), while others hold that socialism entails the existence of a legislative body administered by people who would be elected in a representative democracy.

Different ideologies support different governments. During the era of the Soviet Union, Western socialists were divided as to whether the Soviet Union was actually socialist, moving toward socialism, or inherently non-socialist and inimical to true socialism. Today, the government of the People's Republic of China claims to be socialist and refers to its own approach as socialism with Chinese characteristics, but many other socialists consider modern China to be essentially capitalist. The Chinese leadership concurs with most of the usual critiques of a command economy, and many of their actions to manage what they call a socialist economy have been determined by this opinion.

== Socialist planned economy ==
A socialist planned economy combines public ownership and management of the means of production with centralized state planning, and can refer to a broad range of economic systems from the centralized Soviet-style command economy to participatory planning via workplace democracy. In a centrally-planned economy, decisions regarding the quantity and allocation of goods and services to be produced are planned in advance by a planning agency. This type of economic system has often been combined with a one-party political system and is associated with the Communist states of the 20th century.

=== State-directed economy ===
A state-directed economy is a system where either the state or worker cooperatives own the means of production, but economic activity is directed to some degree by a government agency through mechanisms such as indicative planning or dirigisme. This differs from a centralized planned economy, or a command economy, in that micro-economic decision making, such as quantity to be produced and output requirements, is left to managers and workers in state enterprises or cooperative enterprises rather than being mandated by a comprehensive economic plan. However, the state will plan long-term strategic investment and some aspects of production. It is possible for a state-directed economy to have elements of both a market and planned economy. For example, production and investment decisions may be semi-planned by the state, but distribution of output may be determined by the market mechanism.

=== Decentralized planned economy ===
A decentralized planned economy is one where ownership of enterprises is accomplished through self-management and worker cooperatives and in which planning is done from the bottom up by worker councils in a democratic manner. This form of socialist economy is related to the political philosophies of libertarian socialism, syndicalism, and various forms of utopian socialism.

Examples of decentralized democratic planning include council communism, individualist anarchism, industrial democracy, participatory economics, Soviet democracy, and syndicalism.

== Market socialism ==
Market socialism refers to various economic systems that involve either public ownership and management or worker cooperative ownership over the means of production (or a combination of both) and the market mechanism for allocating economic output, deciding what to produce and in what quantity. In state-oriented forms of market socialism, where state enterprises attempt to maximize profit, the profits can fund government programs and services, eliminating or diminishing the need for various forms of taxation that exist in capitalist systems.

Some forms of market socialism are based on neoclassical economic theory, with the aim of attaining pareto efficiency by setting prices to equal marginal cost in public enterprises. This form of socialism was promoted by Oskar Lange, Abba Lerner, and Frederick Taylor. Other forms of market socialism are based on classical economics, such as those advocated by Thomas Hodgskin, who viewed interest accumulation, rent, and profit as deductions from exchange-value, so that eliminating the capitalist element from the economy would lead to a free market and socialism. The term market socialism has also been applied to planned economic systems that try to organize themselves along market lines while retaining centralized state ownership of capital.

Examples of market socialism include economic democracy, the Lange model, liberal socialism, market-oriented left-libertarianism, mutualism, the New Economic Mechanism, and Ricardian socialism. Other types of market socialist systems, such as mutualism, are related to the political philosophy of libertarian socialism.

=== Socialist market economy ===
A socialist market economy refers to the economic systems adopted by the People's Republic of China, the Socialist Republic of Vietnam, and Yugoslavia. Although there is debate as to whether or not these models constitute state capitalism, the decisive means of production remain under state-ownership. State enterprises are organized into corporations through corporatization and operate like private capitalist enterprises. A substantial private sector exists alongside the state sector of the economy, but it plays a secondary role usually relegated to the service sector and production of consumer goods.

== Socialist ideologies ==
=== Utopian socialism ===
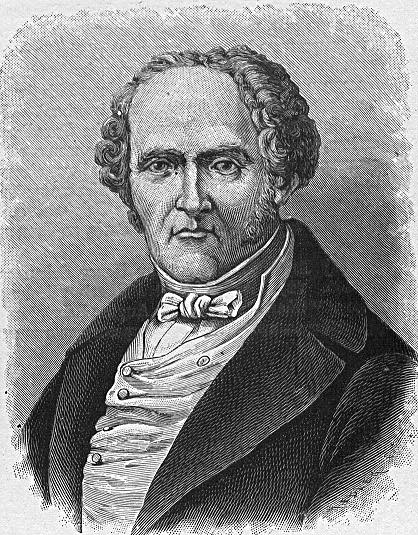
Charles Fourier, an influential early French socialist

Utopian socialism is a term used to describe the earliest currents of modern socialist thought exemplified by the work of Henri de Saint-Simon, Charles Fourier, and Robert Owen, which inspired Karl Marx and other early socialists. Although it is technically possible for any set of ideas or any person living at any time in history to be a utopian socialist, the term is most often applied to those socialists who lived in the first quarter of the 19th century who were ascribed the label "utopian" by later socialists as a negative term, in order to imply naïveté and dismiss their ideas as fanciful or unrealistic. Later socialists argued that visions of ideal societies, which competed with revolutionary social democratic movements, were not grounded in the material conditions of society and were therefore "reactionary". Sociocracy is a socialist-positivist political view created by Auguste Comte, based on Saint-Simon's aristocratic, utopian socialist heritage, prioritizing social justice and a central government with direct democracy.

Modern intentional communities based on socialist ideas could also be categorized as "utopian socialist".

While Marxism had a significant impact on socialist thought, pre-Marxist thinkers had advocated socialism in forms both similar and in stark contrast to Marx and Friedrich Engels' conception of socialism, advocating some form of collective ownership over large-scale production, worker-management within the workplace, or in some cases a form of planned economy. Early socialist philosophers and political theorists included Gerrard Winstanley, who founded the Diggers movement in the United Kingdom; French philosopher Charles Fourier; French writer Louis Blanqui; Norwegian socialist Marcus Thrane; Genevan philosopher Jean-Jacques Rousseau, whose works influenced the French Revolution; and French political writer Pierre-Joseph Proudhon. Pre-Marxist socialists also included Ricardian socialist economists such as Thomas Hodgskin, Charles Hall, John Francis Bray, John Gray, William Thompson, Percy Ravenstone, James Mill, and John Stuart Mill.

=== Scientific socialism ===
The term scientific socialism was used by Friedrich Engels to describe the social-political-economic theory pioneered by Karl Marx. The term was coined in 1840 by Pierre-Joseph Proudhon in his book What is Property? to mean a society ruled by a scientific government, or one whose sovereignty rests upon reason rather than will.

Although the term socialism has come to mean specifically a combination of political and economic science, it is also applicable to a broader area of science encompassing what is now considered sociology and the humanities. The distinction between Utopian and scientific socialism originated with Marx, who criticized the Utopian characteristics of French socialism and English and Scottish political economy. Engels later argued that Utopian socialists failed to recognize why socialism arose in the historical context it did as a response to social contradictions in capitalism. In recognizing the nature of socialism as the resolution of this contradiction and applying a scientific understanding of capitalism, Engels asserted that socialism had become a science.

=== Communism ===
Communism (from Latin communis, "common, universal") is a philosophical, social, political, and economic ideology and movement, the ultimate goal of which is the establishment of a communist society, that is a socioeconomic order structured upon the common ownership of the means of production and the absence of social classes, money and the state. Along with social democracy, communism became the dominant political tendency within the international socialist movement by the 1920s. While the emergence of the Soviet Union as the world's first nominally communist state led to communism's widespread association with the Soviet economic model and Marxism–Leninism, some scholars have argued that the model functioned as a form of state capitalism, or a non-planned administrative or command economy.

Communism has usually been distinguished from socialism since the 1840s. The modern definition and usage of socialism was settled by the 1860s, becoming the predominant term among the group of words associationist, cooperative, and mutualist, which had previously been used as synonyms. The term communism fell out of use during this period. An early distinction between communism and socialism was that the latter aimed to only socialize production while the former aimed to socialize both production and consumption. However, by 1888 Marxists employed socialism in place of communism, which was considered an old-fashioned synonym for socialism. It was not until 1917 after the Bolshevik Revolution that socialism came to refer to a distinct stage between capitalism and communism, introduced by Vladimir Lenin as a means to defend the Bolshevik seizure of power against traditional Marxist criticism that Russia's productive forces were not sufficiently developed for socialist revolution. A distinction between communist and socialist as descriptors of political ideologies arose in 1918 after the Russian Social-Democratic Labour Party renamed itself to the All-Russian Communist Party, where communist came to specifically mean socialists who supported the politics and theories of Bolshevism, Leninism and later Marxism–Leninism, although communist parties continued to describe themselves as socialists dedicated to socialism.

Both communism and socialism eventually accorded with the adherents' and opponents' cultural attitude towards religion. In Christian Europe, communism was believed to be an atheist way of life. In Protestant England, communism was too culturally and aurally close to the Roman Catholic communion rite, hence English atheists denoted themselves as socialists. Friedrich Engels argued that in 1848, at the time when The Communist Manifesto was first published, "socialism was respectable on the continent, while communism was not". The Owenites in England and the Fourierists in France were considered respectable socialists while working-class movements that "proclaimed the necessity of total social change" denoted themselves communists. This latter branch of socialism produced the communist work of Étienne Cabet in France and Wilhelm Weitling in Germany.

The dominant forms of communism are based on Marxism, but there are also non-Marxist versions of communism such as anarchist communism and Christian communism. According to The Oxford Handbook of Karl Marx, "Marx used many terms to refer to a post-capitalist society—positive humanism, socialism, Communism, realm of free individuality, free association of producers, etc. He used these terms completely interchangeably. The notion that 'socialism' and 'Communism' are distinct historical stages is alien to his work and only entered the lexicon of Marxism after his death".

=== Marxism ===
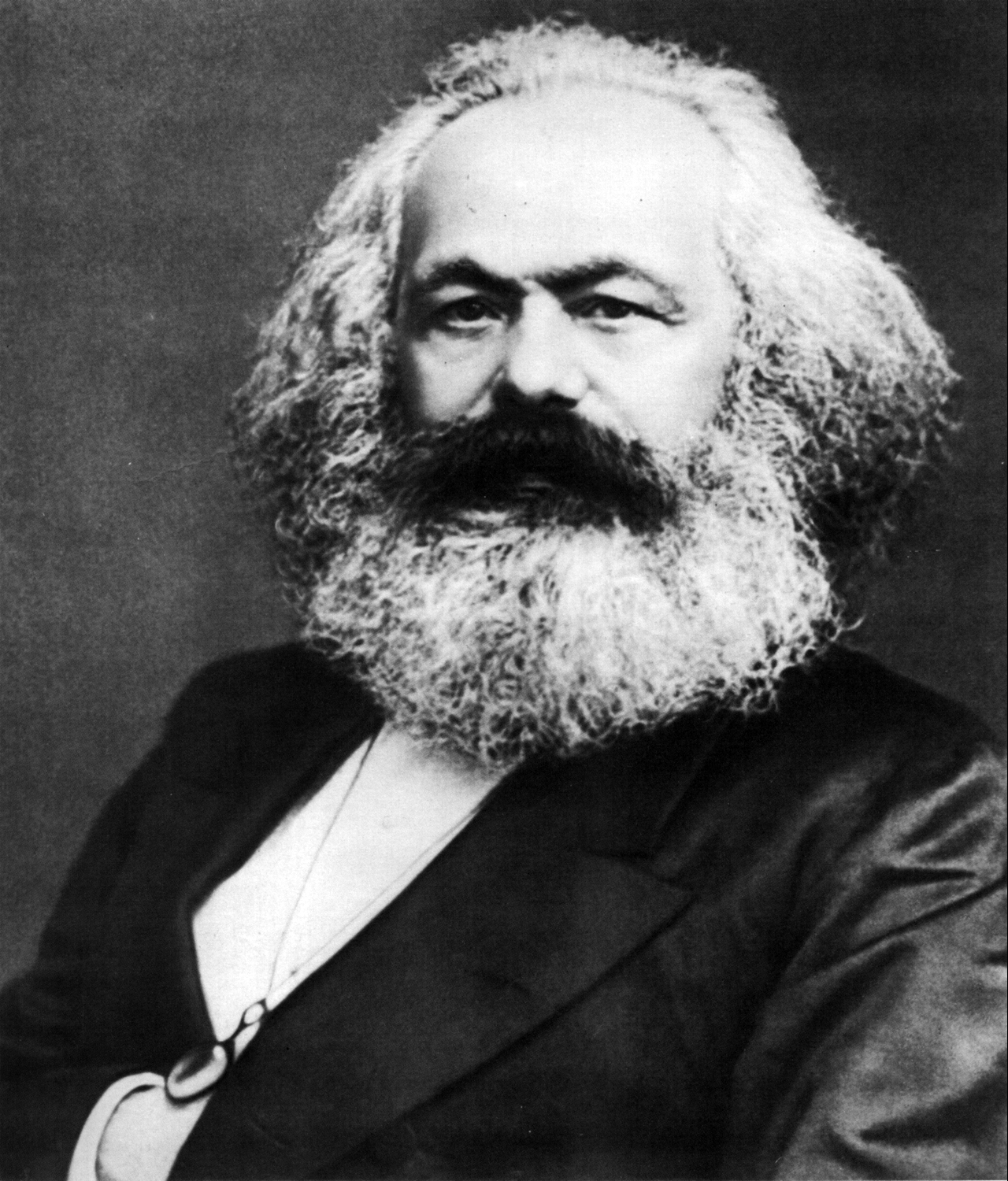
Karl Marx, influential German socialist

Marxism, or Marxist communism, refers to a classless, stateless social organization based upon common ownership of the means of production and to a variety of movements acting in the name of this goal, which are influenced by the philosophy of Karl Marx. From a Marxist position, the actual goal of communism has never been attained in practice. Communist state is used by Western historians, political scientists, and media to refer to these countries and distinguish them from other socialist states. In practice, most governments that have claimed to be communists have not described themselves as a communist state nor have they claimed to have achieved communism or communist society. Those states have referred to themselves as socialist states that are in the process of constructing socialism. The actual goal of communism is to abolish all leadership, and govern with a commune; that is, to achieve a state where the people themselves make all decisions, and everyone contributes to the well-being of the commune.

The modern Marxist communist movement was created when the social democratic parties of Europe split between their rightist and leftist tendencies during World War I. The leftists, led internationally by Vladimir Lenin, Rosa Luxemburg, and Karl Liebknecht, to distinguish their brand of socialism from the "reformist" social democrats, were called "communists". However, after Luxemburg's and Liebknecht's murders the term communist became generally associated solely with the parties and organisations following Lenin, along with their various derivations, such as Stalinism and Maoism.

There is a considerable variety of views among self-identified communists. However, Marxism and Leninism, schools of communism associated with Marx and Lenin respectively, have the distinction of having been a major force in world politics since the early 20th century. Class struggle plays a central role in Marxism. This theory views the formation of communism as the culmination of the class struggle between the capitalist class and the working class. Marx held that society could not be transformed from the capitalist mode of production to the communist mode of production all at once, but required a transitional state that Marx described as the revolutionary dictatorship of the proletariat.

Some forms of the communist society that Marx envisioned have been claimed to have been achieved for limited periods during certain historical moments and under certain circumstances. For example, the Paris Commune let Marx reinforce and implement his theories by adapting them to a real world experience. Another similar case was the Spanish Revolution of 1936, during which much of Spain's economy in Republican areas, some of which enjoyed a practical absence of state, was put under workers' direct collective control.

The term communism is often used to refer to those political and economic systems and states dominated by a political, bureaucratic class, typically attached to one single Communist party that follow Marxist–Leninist doctrines and who often claim to represent the dictatorship of the proletariat in a non-democratic fashion, described by critics as totalitarian and bureaucratic.

With the Soviet Union's creation after the end of the Russian Civil War, socialist parties in other countries and the Bolshevik party itself became Communist parties, owing allegiance of varying degrees to the Communist Party of the Soviet Union (see Communist International). After World War II, Communist regimes took power in Eastern Europe. In 1949, the Communists in China, supported by the Soviet Union and led by Mao Zedong, came to power and established the People's Republic of China. Among the other countries in the Third World that adopted a bureaucratic Communist state as its government at some point were Cuba, North Korea, Vietnam, Laos, Angola, and Mozambique. By the early 1980s, almost one-third of the world's population lived under Communist rule.

Communism carries a strong social stigma in the United States due to a history of anti-communism in the United States. Since the early 1970s, the term Eurocommunism has been used to refer to the policies of Communist parties in Western Europe, which sought to break with the tradition of uncritical and unconditional support of the Soviet Union. Such parties were politically active and electorally significant in France and Italy. With the collapse of the statalized one-party systems and Marxist–Leninist governments in Eastern Europe from the late 1980s and the breakup of the Soviet Union in 1991, Marxist–Leninist state communism's influence decreased dramatically in Europe, but around a quarter of the world's population still lives under a kind of Communist state.

==== Leninism and Marxism–Leninism ====
Leninism is a political ideology developed by Russian Marxist revolutionary Vladimir Lenin that proposes the establishment of the dictatorship of the proletariat led by a revolutionary vanguard party as the political prelude to the establishment of communism. Lenin's ideological contributions to the Marxist ideology relate to his theories on the party, imperialism, the state, and revolution. The function of the Leninist vanguard party was to provide the working classes with the political consciousness (education and organisation) and revolutionary leadership necessary to depose capitalism in the Russian Empire (1721–1917).

Marxism–Leninism is a communist ideology that became the largest faction of the communist movement following the October Revolution. It was the predominant ideology of most communist governments in the 20th century. It was developed in the Soviet Union by Joseph Stalin and drew on Bolshevism, Leninism, and Classical Marxism. It was the state ideology of the Soviet Union, Soviet satellite states in the Eastern Bloc, and various countries in the Non-Aligned Movement and Third World during the Cold War, as well as the Communist International. It is the official ideology of the ruling parties of China, Cuba, Laos, and Vietnam, as well as other communist parties. The state ideology of North Korea is derived from Marxism–Leninism.

==== Trotskyism ====
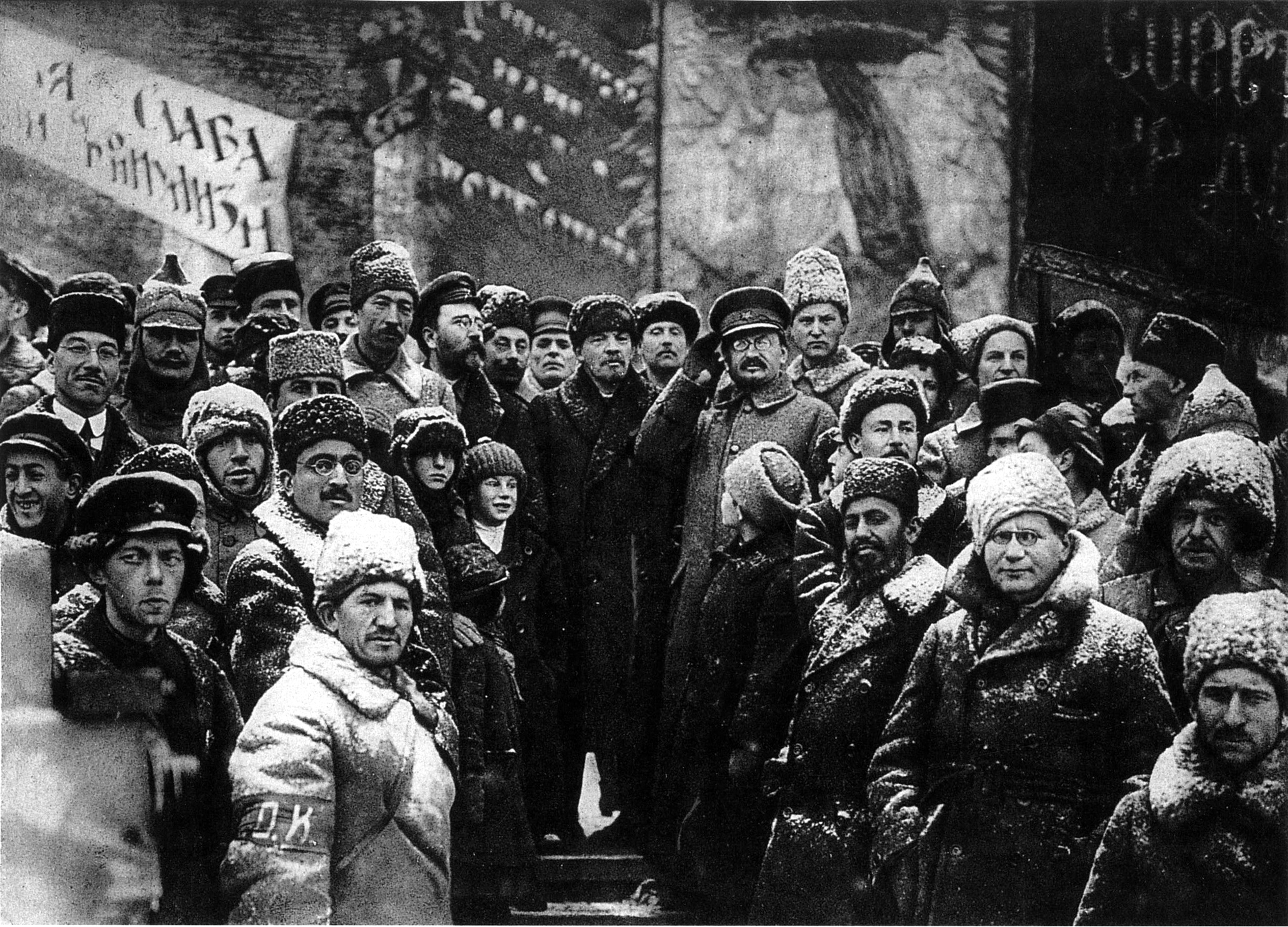
Lenin, Trotsky and Kamenev celebrating the second anniversary of the October Revolution

Trotskyism is the theory of Marxism advocated by Russian revolutionary and intellectual Leon Trotsky. Trotsky had been the leader of the Red Army and honorary president of the Third International, and Lenin had proposed he serve as Vice-chairman to preside over economic management. Trotsky considered himself a Bolshevik–Leninist, arguing for the establishment of a vanguard party. He considered himself an advocate of orthodox Marxism. His politics differed greatly from those of Stalin or Mao, most importantly in declaring the need for an international "permanent revolution" and arguing that democracy was essential to both socialism and communism. Numerous groups around the world continue to describe themselves as Trotskyist, although they have diverse interpretations of the conclusions to be drawn from this.

Trotsky advocated for a decentralized form of economic planning, elected representation of Soviet socialist parties, worker's control of production, mass soviet democratization, the tactic of a united front against far-right parties, cultural autonomy for artistic movements, voluntary collectivisation, a transitional program, and socialist internationalism.

The economic platform of a planned economy combined with an authentic worker's democracy as advocated by Trotsky has constituted the programme of the Fourth International and the modern Trotskyist movement.

==== Stalinism ====
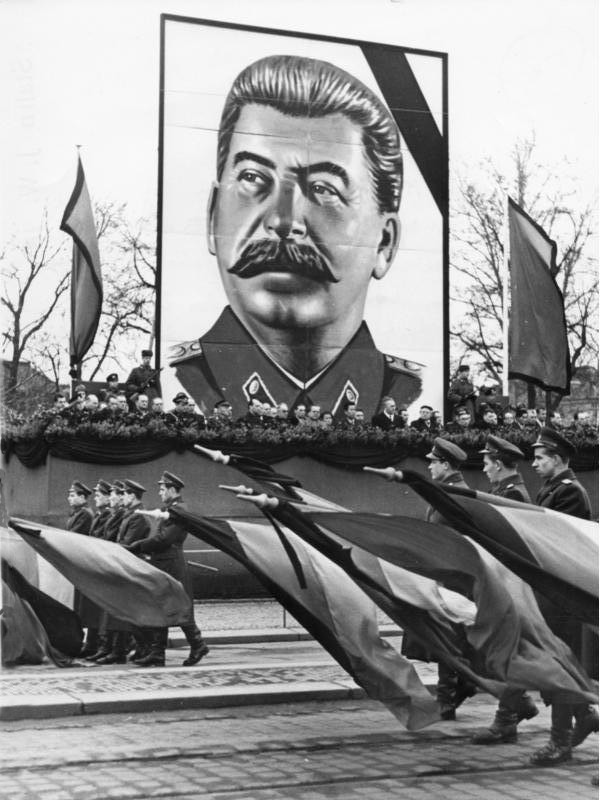
Soldiers marching before a portrait of Stalin

Stalinism was the totalitarian theory and practice of communism practiced by Joseph Stalin, leader of the Soviet Union from 1928 to 1953. Officially, it adhered to Marxism–Leninism, but whether Stalin's practices actually followed the principles of Marx and Lenin is a subject of debate and criticism. In contrast to Marx and Lenin, Stalin made few theoretical contributions. Stalin's main contributions to communist theory were Socialism in One Country and the theory of aggravation of class struggle under socialism, a theory supporting the repression of political opponents as necessary. Stalinism took an aggressive stance on class conflict, utilizing state violence in an attempt to forcibly purge society of the bourgeoisie. The groundwork for the Soviet policy concerning nationalities was laid out in Stalin's 1913 work Marxism and the National Question.

Stalinist policies in the Soviet Union featured de facto one-man rule, rapid industrialization, cult of personality, mass censorship, Five-Year Plans, socialism in one country, a centralized state, collectivization of agriculture, and subordination of the interests of other communist parties to those of the Communist Party of the Soviet Union. Rapid industrialization was designed to accelerate the development towards communism, stressing that industrialization was needed because the country was economically backward in comparison with other countries, and was needed in order to face the challenges posed by internal and external enemies. Rapid industrialization was accompanied by mass collective farming and rapid urbanization, which converted many small villages into industrial cities.

==== Maoism ====
Maoism, officially Mao Zedong Thought, (Note: The term "Maoism" is a creation of Mao's supporters; Mao himself always rejected it and preferred the use of the term "Mao Zedong Thought".) (Note: Also called "Mao Tse-tung Thought", "Mao Tse Tung Thought" or "Mao Tsetung Thought", and shortened as "MTTT" or "MTT" before the transition to Pinyin.) is a variety of Marxism–Leninism that Mao Zedong developed while trying to realise a socialist revolution in the agricultural, pre-industrial society of the Republic of China and later the People's Republic of China. A difference between Maoism and traditional Marxism–Leninism is that a united front of progressive forces in class society would lead the revolutionary vanguard in pre-industrial societies rather than communist revolutionaries alone. This theory, in which revolutionary praxis is primary and ideological orthodoxy is secondary, purports to represent urban Marxism–Leninism adapted to pre-industrial China. Later theoreticians expanded on the idea that Mao had adapted Marxism–Leninism to Chinese conditions, arguing that he had in fact updated it fundamentally and that Maoism could be applied universally throughout the world. This ideology is often referred to as Marxism–Leninism–Maoism to distinguish it from the original ideas of Mao.

==== Dengism ====
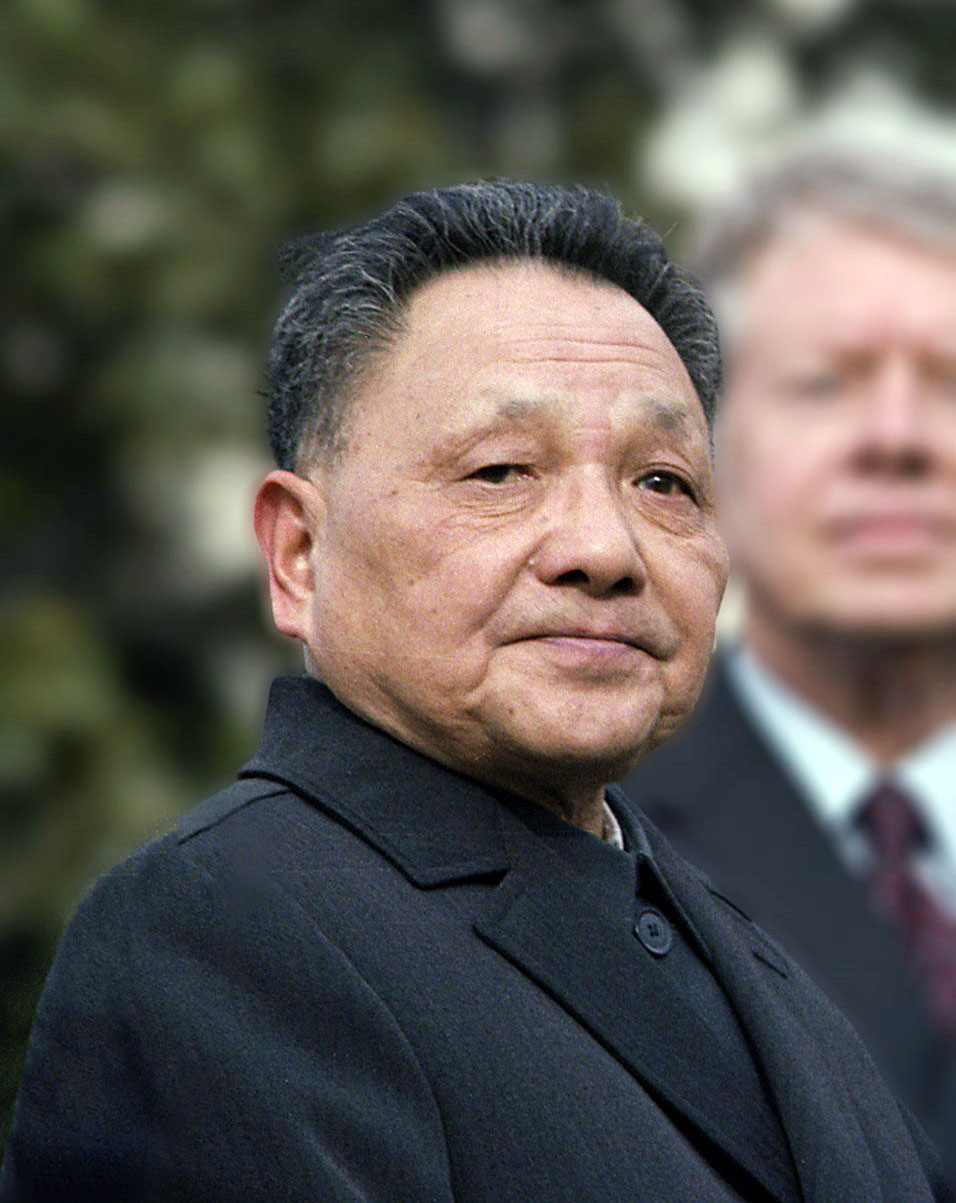
Deng Xiaoping

Dengism originated with Chinese leader Deng Xiaoping. Dengism adapts Marxism–Leninism and Maoism to China's specific socio-economic context. Deng emphasized several key principles, including opening China to the global community, implementing the "one country, two systems" policy, and promoting political and economic pragmatism through the maxim "seek truth from facts".

As a reformist branch of communism and a variant of Maoism, Dengism is often criticized by traditional Maoists. Dengists believe that given China's isolation in the current international order and its under-developed economy, it is crucial to swiftly bridge the gap between China and the West for socialism to succeed. To encourage productivity and foster innovation, Dengism advocates for the introduction of market elements into the socialist system. Dengists maintain that China should retain public ownership of land, banks, raw materials, and strategic industries, but they also endorse private ownership in industries related to finished goods and services. According to Dengist theory, private owners in these industries do not constitute a bourgeoisie, as the term "bourgeois" traditionally refers to those who own land and raw materials. Instead, private company owners are referred to as civil-run enterprises. Dengists take a firm stance against any form of personality cult, such as those in China under Mao's rule, the Soviet Union during Stalin's era, and North Korea under the Kim family.

China adopted this model, which is vaguely similar to Russia under Lenin's New Economic Policy, through the reform and opening up. The adoption of this model significantly boosted China's economy, leading to what is often referred to as the Chinese economic miracle. Over a period of thirty years, China achieved an annual GDP growth rate of over 8%, securing its position as the world's second-largest economy. Dengism has been adopted in other countries as well, such as Vietnam and Laos, resulting in substantial economic growth in those countries. In the case of Laos, the real GDP growth rate reached 8.3%. Cuba has explored this model, allowing small and medium-sized private businesses in 2021.

==== Council communism and left communism ====
Council communism is opposed to the party vanguardism and democratic centralism of Leninist ideologies. It contends that democratic workers' councils arising in the factories and municipalities are the natural form of working-class organization and authority. Council communism also stands in contrast to social democracy by formally rejecting both reformism and parliamentarism.

==== Autonomism ====
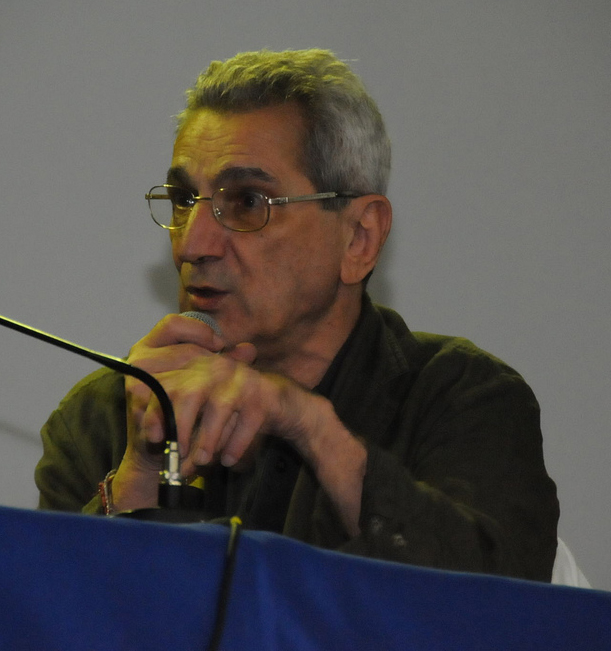
Antonio Negri, main theorist of Italian autonomism

Autonomism refers to a set of left-wing political and social movements and theories closely aligned with the socialist movement. As an identifiable theoretical system, it first emerged in Italy in the 1960s from workerist (operaismo) communism. Later, post-Marxist and anarchist tendencies became significant after influence from the Situationists, the failure of Italian far-left movements in the 1970s, and the emergence of a number of important theorists, such as Mario Tronti, Paolo Virno, and Antonio Negri, who contributed to the 1969 founding of Potere Operaio.

Unlike other forms of Marxism, autonomist Marxism emphasizes the ability of the working class to force changes to the organization of the capitalist system independent of the state, trade unions, or political parties. Autonomists are less concerned with party organization than other Marxists, focusing instead on self-organized action outside of traditional organizational structures. Autonomist Marxism is thus a "bottom up" theory—it draws attention to activities that autonomists see as everyday working class resistance to capitalism, such absenteeism, slow working, and socialization in the workplace.

The Italian operaismo movement also influenced Marxist academics such as Harry Cleaver, John Holloway, Steve Wright, and Nick Dyer-Witheford.

=== Anarchism ===
Anarchism (from Greek: αναρχία, anarkhia; "without a ruler") is a political philosophy that advocates stateless societies based on non-hierarchical free associations. Anarchism holds that the state is undesirable, unnecessary, or harmful. While anti-statism is central, anarchism may entail opposing authority or hierarchical organization in the conduct of human relations, including, but not limited to, the state system. Anarchism as a social movement has regularly endured fluctuations in popularity. Its classical period, which scholars demarcate as lasting from 1860 to 1939, is associated with the working-class movements of the 19th century and the Spanish Civil War-era struggles against fascism.

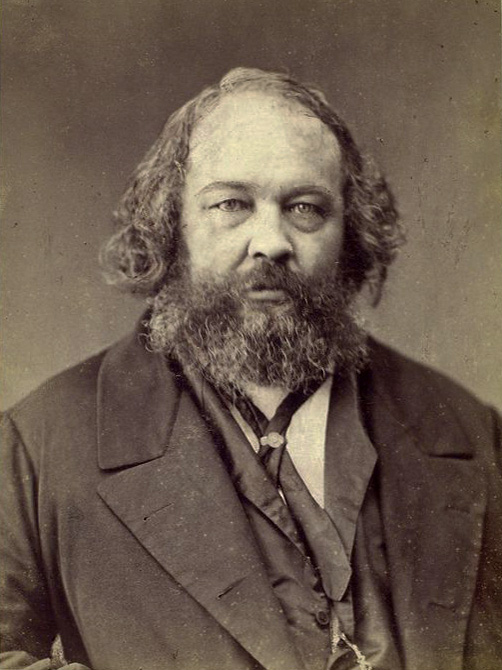
Mikhail Bakunin, a Russian anarchist who opposed the Marxist aim of dictatorship of the proletariat in favour of universal rebellion and allied himself with the federalists in the First International before his expulsion by Marxists

In 1864, the International Workingmen's Association, also known as the First International, united diverse revolutionary currents, including French followers of Proudhon. The anti-authoritarian sections of the First International were the precursors of the anarcho-syndicalists, seeking to "replace the privilege and authority of the State" with the "free and spontaneous organization of labour."

In 1907, the International Anarchist Congress of Amsterdam gathered delegates from 14 countries, among whom were important figures of the anarchist movement, including Errico Malatesta, Pierre Monatte, Luigi Fabbri, Benoît Broutchoux, Emma Goldman, Rudolf Rocker, and Christiaan Cornelissen. Various themes were addressed during the Congress, in particular concerning the organization of the anarchist movement, popular education issues, the general strike, and antimilitarism. A central debate concerned the relation between anarchism and syndicalism. The Spanish Workers Federation in 1881 was the first major anarcho-syndicalist movement; anarchist trade union federations were of special importance in Spain. The most successful was the Confederación Nacional del Trabajo (CNT), founded in 1910. Before the 1940s, the CNT was the major force in Spanish working-class politics, at one point attracting 1.58 million members and playing a major role in the Spanish Civil War. The CNT was affiliated with the International Workers Association, a federation of anarcho-syndicalist trade unions founded in 1922, with delegates representing two million workers from 15 countries in Europe and Latin America.

Some anarchists, such as Johann Most, advocated publicizing violent acts of retaliation against counter-revolutionaries because "we preach not only action in and for itself, but also action as propaganda." Numerous heads of state were assassinated between 1881 and 1914 by members of the anarchist movement. For example, U.S. President William McKinley's assassin Leon Czolgosz claimed to have been influenced by anarchist and feminist Emma Goldman. Anarchists participated alongside the Bolsheviks in both the February and October revolutions, and were initially enthusiastic about the Bolshevik coup. However, the Bolsheviks soon turned against the anarchists and other left-wing opposition, a conflict that culminated in the 1921 Kronstadt rebellion, which the new government repressed. Anarchists in central Russia were either imprisoned, driven underground or joined the victorious Bolsheviks; the anarchists from Petrograd and Moscow fled to Ukraine. There, in the Makhnovshchina, they fought in the civil war against the Whites (a Western-backed grouping of monarchists and other opponents of the October Revolution) and then the Bolsheviks as part of the Revolutionary Insurgent Army of Ukraine led by Nestor Makhno, who established an anarchist society in the region for a number of months.

In the 1920s and 1930s, the rise of fascism in Europe transformed anarchism's conflict with the state. In Spain, the CNT initially refused to join a popular front electoral alliance, and abstention by CNT supporters led to a right-wing election victory. In 1936, the CNT changed its policy and anarchist votes helped bring the popular front back to power. Months later, the former ruling class responded with an attempted coup causing the Spanish Civil War (1936–1939). In response to the army rebellion, an anarchist-inspired movement of peasants and workers, supported by armed militias, took control of Barcelona and of large areas of rural Spain where they collectivized the land. But even before the fascist victory in 1939, the anarchists were losing ground in a bitter struggle with the Stalinists, who controlled the distribution of military aid to the Republican cause from the Soviet Union. Stalinist-led troops suppressed the collectives and persecuted both dissident Marxists and anarchists.

A surge of popular interest in anarchism occurred during the 1960s and 1970s. In 1968 in Carrara, Italy the International of Anarchist Federations was founded during an international Anarchist conference in Carrara in 1968 by the three existing European federations of France, the Italian and the Iberian Anarchist Federation, and the Bulgarian federation in French exile. In the United Kingdom, this was associated with the punk rock movement, as exemplified by bands such as Crass and the Sex Pistols. The housing and employment crisis in most of Western Europe led to the formation of communes and squatter movements such as those in Barcelona, Spain. In Denmark, squatters occupied a disused military base and declared the Freetown Christiania, an autonomous haven in central Copenhagen.

Since the revival of anarchism in the mid-20th century, a number of new movements and schools of thought emerged. Around the turn of the 21st century, anarchism grew in popularity and influence as part of the anti-war, anti-capitalist, and anti-globalization movements. Anarchists became known for their involvement in protests against the meetings of the World Trade Organization (WTO), Group of Eight, and the World Economic Forum. International anarchist federations in existence include the International of Anarchist Federations, the International Workers' Association, and International Libertarian Solidarity.

==== Mutualism ====
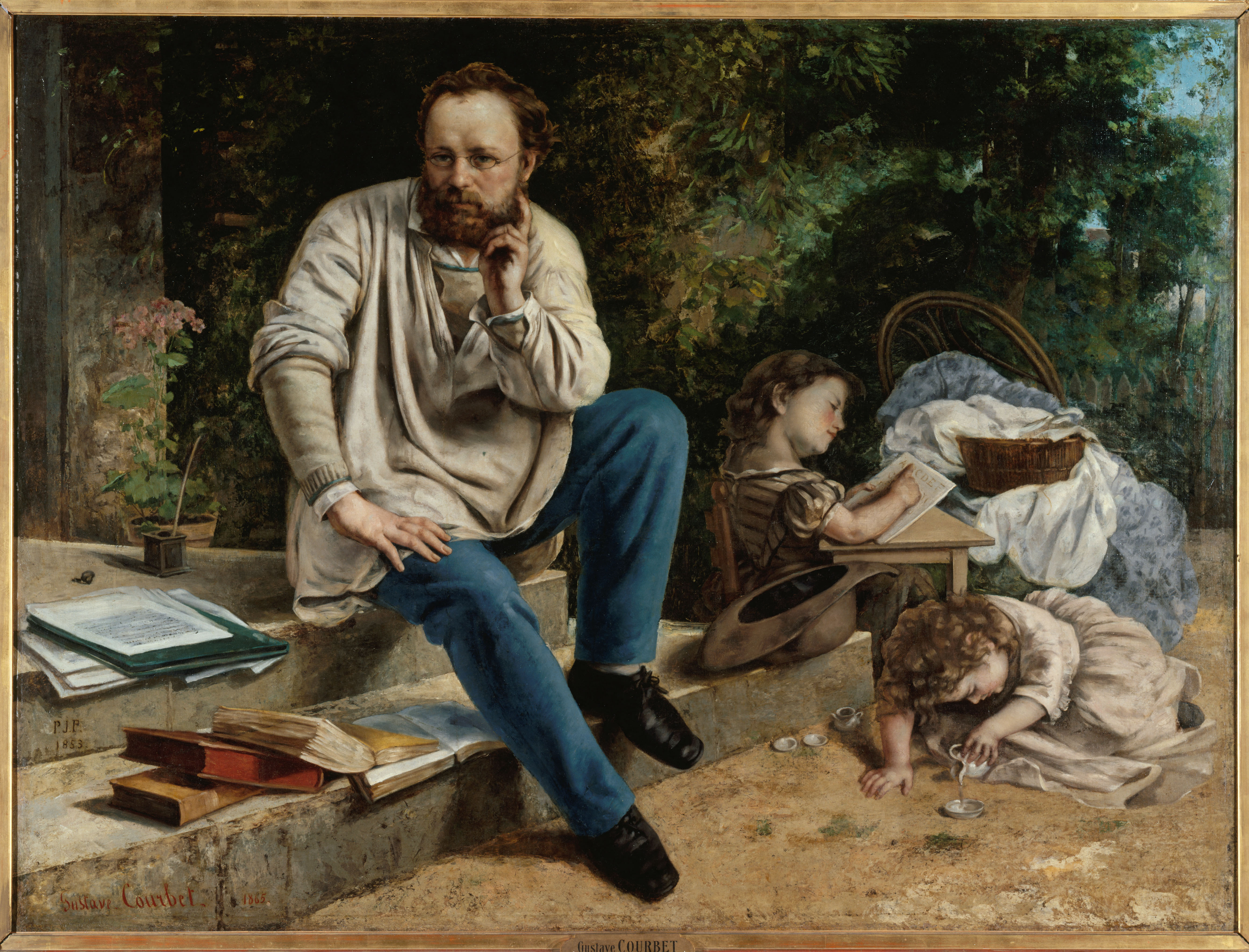
Pierre-Joseph Proudhon, French socialist and theoretician of mutualism

Mutualism began in the 18th-century English and French labour movements, then took an anarchist form associated with Pierre-Joseph Proudhon in France and others in the United States. This influenced individualist anarchists in the US, such as Benjamin Tucker and William B. Greene. Josiah Warren proposed similar ideas in 1833 after participating in a failed Owenite experiment. In the 1840s and 1850s, Greene and Charles A. Dana introduced Proudhon's works to the US. Greene adapted Proudhon's mutualism to American conditions and introduced it to Tucker.

Mutualist anarchism is concerned with reciprocity, free association, voluntary contract, federation, and credit and currency reform. Many mutualists believe a market without government intervention drives prices down to labour costs, eliminating profit, rent, and interest according to the labor theory of value. Firms would be forced to compete over workers just as workers compete over firms, raising wages. Some see mutualism as between individualist and collectivist anarchism. In What Is Property?, Proudhon develops a concept of "liberty", equivalent to "anarchy", which is the dialectical "synthesis of communism and property." Greene, influenced by Pierre Leroux, sought mutualism in the synthesis of three philosophies: communism, capitalism, and socialism. Later individualist anarchists used the term mutualism but retained little emphasis on synthesis, while social anarchists, such as the authors of An Anarchist FAQ, claim mutualism as a subset of their philosophical tradition.

==== Collectivist anarchism ====
Collectivist anarchism is a revolutionary form of anarchism most commonly associated with Mikhail Bakunin, Johann Most, and the anti-authoritarian section of the First International. Unlike mutualists, collectivist anarchists oppose all private ownership of the means of production, instead advocating that ownership be collectivized. This was to be initiated by small cohesive elite group through acts of violence, or "propaganda by the deed", which would inspire the workers to revolt and forcibly collectivize the means of production. Workers would be compensated for their work on the basis of the amount of time they contributed to production, rather than goods being distributed "according to need" as in anarchist communism.

Although collectivist anarchism shares many similarities with anarchist communism, there are also many key differences between them. For example, collectivist anarchists believe that the economy and most or all property should be collectively owned by society while anarchist communists believe that the concept of ownership should be rejected by society and replaced with the concept of usage. Collectivist anarchists often favor using a form of currency to compensate workers according to the amount of time spent contributing to society while anarchist communists believe that currency and wages should be abolished altogether and goods should be distributed "to each according to his or her need".

==== Anarchist communism ====
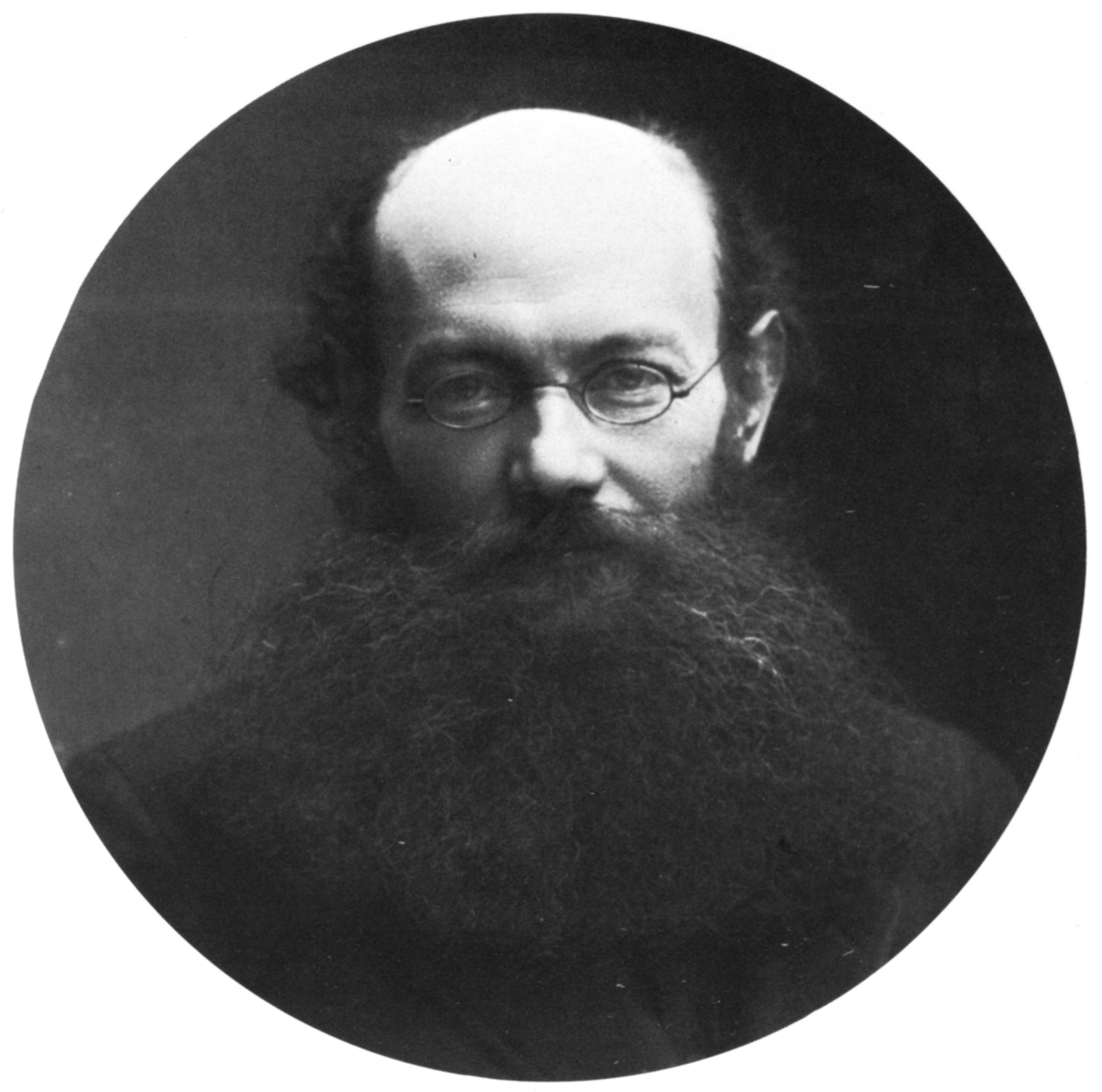
Peter Kropotkin, an anarchist communist theoretician who argued that workers spontaneously self-organize to produce goods in common for all society in anarchy

Anarchist communists propose that a society composed of a number of self-governing communes with collective use of the means of production, with direct democracy as the political organizational form, and related to other communes through federation would be the freest form of social organization. However, some anarchist communists oppose the majoritarian nature of direct democracy, feeling that it can impede individual liberty and favor consensus democracy. Joseph Déjacque was an early anarchist communist and the first person to describe himself as "libertarian". Other important anarchist communists include Peter Kropotkin, Emma Goldman, Alexander Berkman, and Errico Malatesta.

In anarchist communism, individuals would not receive direct compensation for labour, but would instead have free access to the resources and surplus of the commune. On the basis of his biological research and experimentation, Kropotkin believed that humans and human society are more inclined towards efforts for mutual benefit than toward competition and strife. Kropotkin believed that private property was one of the causes of oppression and exploitation and called for its abolition, but he opposed only ownership, not possession.

Some anarcho-syndicalists saw anarchist communism as their objective. For example, the Spanish CNT adopted Isaac Puente's 1932 "Libertarian Communism" as its manifesto for a post-revolutionary society.

Anarchist communism does not always have a communitarian philosophy. Some forms of anarchist communism are egoist and strongly influenced by radical individualism, believing that anarchist communism does not require a communitarian nature at all. Forms of libertarian communism, such as Situationism, are strongly egoist in nature. Anarchist communist Emma Goldman was influenced by both Stirner and Kropotkin and blended their philosophies together in her own, as shown in books of hers such as Anarchism And Other Essays.

==== Anarcho-syndicalism ====
Anarcho-syndicalism is a branch of anarchism that focuses on the labor movement. Anarcho-syndicalists view labor unions as a potential force for revolutionary social change, replacing capitalism and the state with a new society democratically self-managed by workers.

The basic principles of anarcho-syndicalism are the following: Workers' solidarity, direct action, and workers' self-management.

Flag often used by anarcho-syndicalists and anarchist communists and the flag of Revolutionary Catalonia, a 20th-century example of an anarcho-syndicalist society

Anarcho-syndicalists believe all workers—no matter their race, gender, or ethnic group—are in a similar situation in regard to their boss. Within capitalism, any gains or losses made by some workers from or to bosses will eventually affect all workers. Therefore, all workers must support one another in their class conflict to liberate themselves.

Anarcho-syndicalists believe that only direct action—that is, action concentrated on directly attaining a goal, as opposed to indirect action, such as electing a representative to a government position—will allow workers to liberate themselves. Moreover, anarcho-syndicalists believe that workers' organizations should be self-managing. They should not have bosses or "business agents"; rather, the workers should be able to make all the decisions that affect them themselves.

Rudolf Rocker was one of the most popular voices in the anarcho-syndicalist movement. He outlined a view of the origins of the movement, what it sought, and why it was important to the future of labor in his 1938 pamphlet Anarcho-Syndicalism. The International Workers Association is an international anarcho-syndicalist federation of various labor unions from different countries. The Spanish Confederación Nacional del Trabajo played and still plays a major role in the Spanish labor movement. It was also an important force in the Spanish Civil War.

==== Individualist anarchism ====
Individualist anarchism is a set of several traditions of thought within the anarchist movement that emphasizes the individual and their will over external determinants such as groups, society, traditions, and ideological systems. Although usually contrasted to social anarchism, both individualist and social anarchism have influenced each other. Mutualism, an economic theory particularly influential within individualist anarchism whose pursued liberty has been called the synthesis of communism and property, has been considered sometimes part of individualist anarchism and other times part of social anarchism. Many anarchist communists regard themselves as radical individualists, seeing anarchist communism as the best social system for the realization of individual freedom. As a term, individualist anarchism is not a single philosophy, but it refers to a group of individualist philosophies that sometimes are in conflict. Among the early influences on individualist anarchism were William Godwin, Josiah Warren (sovereignty of the individual), Max Stirner (egoism), Lysander Spooner (natural law), Pierre-Joseph Proudhon (mutualism), Henry David Thoreau (transcendentalism), Herbert Spencer (law of equal liberty), and Anselme Bellegarrigue. From there, it expanded through Europe and the United States. Benjamin Tucker, a famous 19th-century individualist anarchist, held that "if the individual has the right to govern himself, all external government is tyranny". Tucker also argued that it was "not Socialist Anarchism against Individualist Anarchism, but of Communist Socialism against Individualist Socialism". The view of an individualist–socialist divide is contested as individualist anarchism is socialistic.

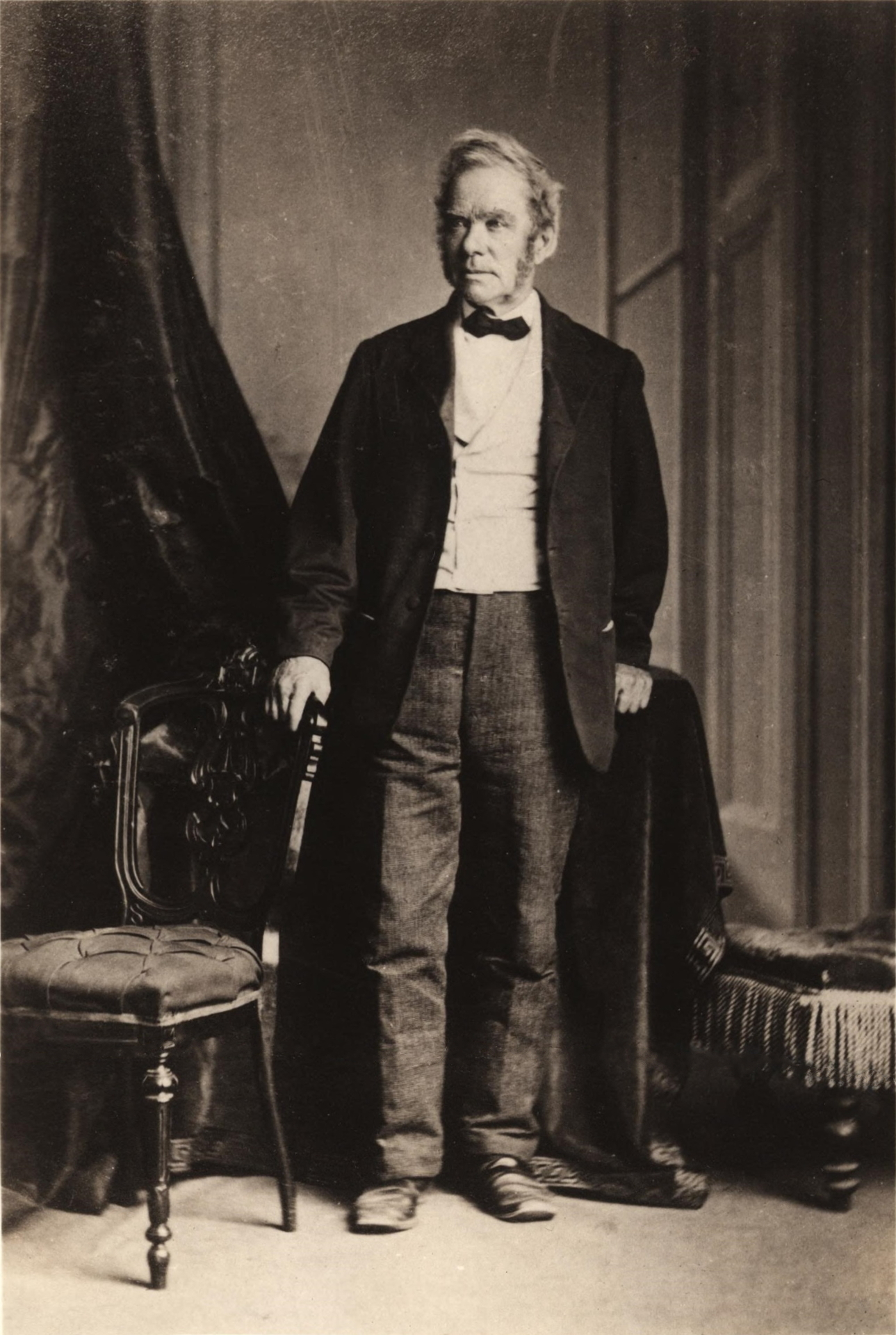
Josiah Warren, regarded by some as the first American anarchist

Josiah Warren is widely regarded as the first American anarchist and the four-page weekly paper he edited during 1833, The Peaceful Revolutionist, was the first anarchist periodical published. For American anarchist historian Eunice Minette Schuster, "[i]t is apparent [...] that Proudhonian Anarchism was to be found in the United States at least as early as 1848 and that it was not conscious of its affinity to the Individualist Anarchism of Josiah Warren and Stephen Pearl Andrews [...]. William B. Greene presented this Proudhonian Mutualism in its purest and most systematic form". Later, Benjamin Tucker "was against both the state and capitalism, against both oppression and exploitation." While not against the market and property he was firmly against capitalism as it was, in his eyes, a state-supported monopoly of social capital (tools, machinery, etc.) which allows owners to exploit their employees, i.e., to avoid paying workers the full value of their labour. He thought that the "labouring classes are deprived of their earnings by usury in its three forms, interest, rent and profit", therefore "Liberty will abolish interest; it will abolish profit; it will abolish monopolistic rent; it will abolish taxation; it will abolish the exploitation of labour; it will abolish all means whereby any labourer can be deprived of any of his product". This stance put him squarely in the libertarian socialist tradition and Tucker referred to himself many times as a socialist and considered his philosophy to be anarchistic socialism.

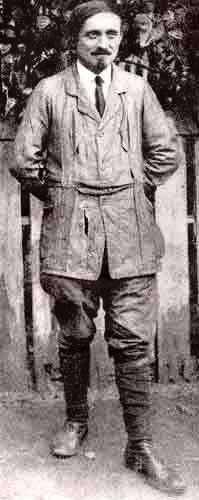
Émile Armand, French individualist anarchist

French individualist anarchist Émile Armand shows clearly opposition to capitalism and centralized economies when he said of the individualist anarchist, "inwardly he remains refractory—fatally refractory—morally, intellectually, economically (The capitalist economy and the directed economy, the speculators and the fabricators of single are equally repugnant to him.)". The Spanish individualist anarchist Miguel Giménez Igualada thought that "capitalism is an effect of government; the disappearance of government means capitalism falls from its pedestal vertiginously...That which we call capitalism is not something else but a product of the State, within which the only thing that is being pushed forward is profit, good or badly acquired. And so to fight against capitalism is a pointless task, since be it State capitalism or Enterprise capitalism, as long as Government exists, exploiting capital will exist. The fight, but of consciousness, is against the State". His view on class division and technocracy are as follows: "Since when no one works for another, the profiteer from wealth disappears, just as government will disappear when no one pays attention to those who learned four things at universities and from that fact they pretend to govern men. Big industrial enterprises will be transformed by men in big associations in which everyone will work and enjoy the product of their work. And from those easy as well as beautiful problems anarchism deals with and he who puts them in practice and lives them are anarchists. [...] The priority which without rest an anarchist must make is that in which no one has to exploit anyone, no man to no man, since that non-exploitation will lead to the limitation of property to individual needs".

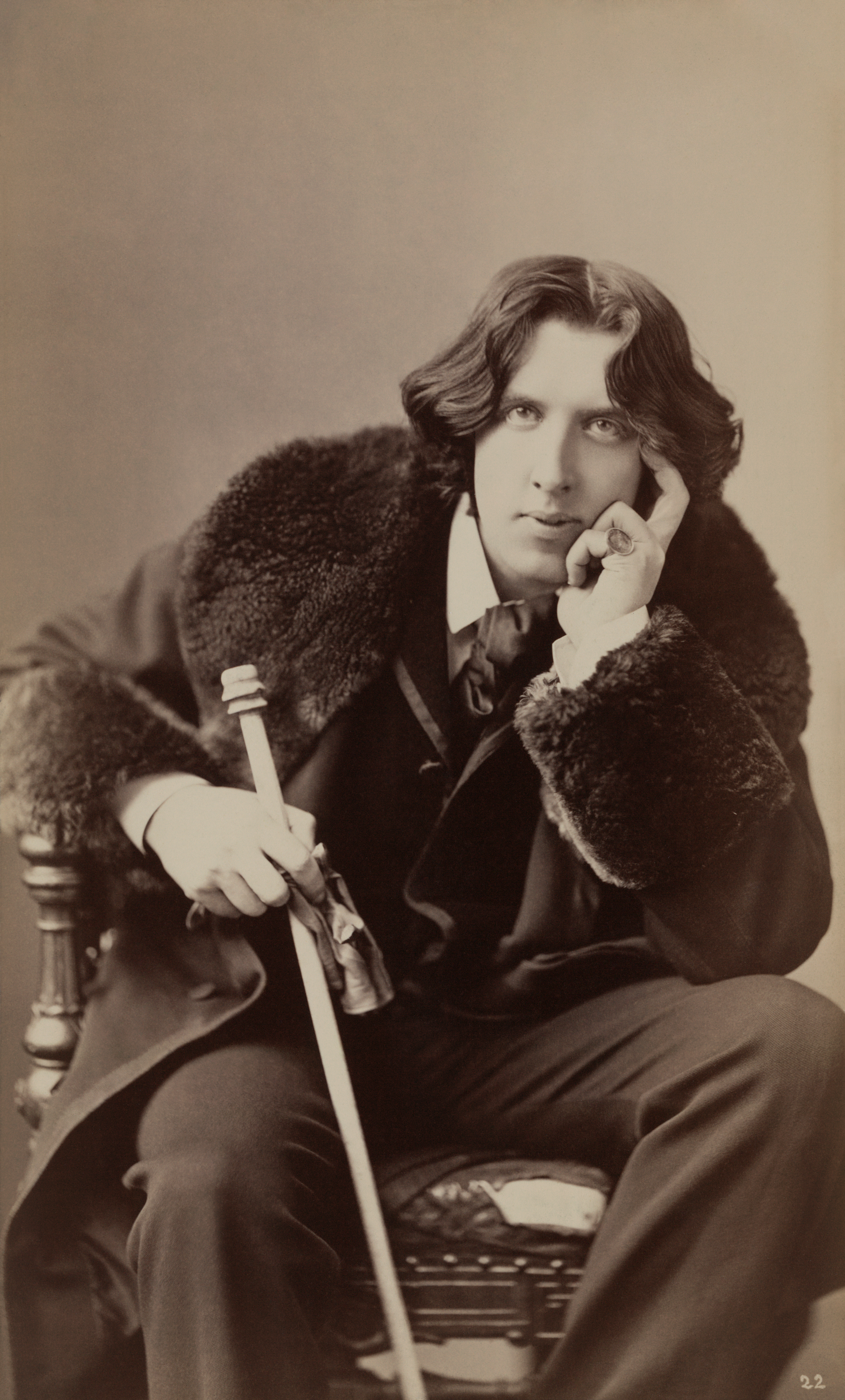
Oscar Wilde, famous anarchist Irish writer who published the libertarian socialist work titled The Soul of Man Under Socialism

The anarchist writer and Bohemian Oscar Wilde wrote in his famous essay The Soul of Man under Socialism that "[a]rt is individualism, and individualism is a disturbing and disintegrating force. There lies its immense value. For what it seeks is to disturb monotony of type, slavery of custom, tyranny of habit, and the reduction of man to the level of a machine". For anarchist historian George Woodcock, "Wilde's aim in The Soul of Man under Socialism is to seek the society most favorable to the artist [...] for Wilde art is the supreme end, containing within itself enlightenment and regeneration, to which all else in society must be subordinated. [...] Wilde represents the anarchist as aesthete". In a socialist society, people will have the possibility to realize their talents as "each member of the society will share in the general prosperity and happiness of the society". Wilde added that "upon the other hand, Socialism itself will be of value simply because it will lead to individualism" since individuals will no longer need to fear poverty or starvation. This individualism would, in turn, protect against governments "armed with economic power as they are now with political power" over their citizens. However, Wilde advocated non-capitalist individualism, saying that "of course, it might be said that the Individualism generated under conditions of private property is not always, or even as a rule, of a fine or wonderful type". In Wilde's imagination, in this way socialism would free men from manual labour and allow them to devote their time to creative pursuits, thus developing their soul. He ended by declaring: "The new individualism is the new hellenism".

=== Democracy ===
==== Democratic socialism ====
The fist and rose, a common symbol of democratic socialism and social democracy

Democratic socialism is a political movement that seeks to propagate the ideals of socialism within the context of a democratic system. Western social democrats popularized democratic socialism as a label to criticize the perceived authoritarian or non-democratic socialist development in the East during the 19th and 20th centuries. In this sense, democratic socialism is closely related to social democracy and in some accounts are identical; other accounts stress differences, while maintaining that they are not mutually exclusive and can be compatible. Many democratic socialists support the system of social democracy as a road to reform of the capitalist system, while others support more revolutionary change in society to establish socialist goals. In the former sense, social democracy is considered to be more centrist and more concerned with gradual improvements of the capitalist system, the mixed economy, and the welfare state, while some more radical social democrats, who describe themselves as democratic socialists, support a more anti-capitalist reformism or more radical evolutionary means, including revolutionary means.

Modern democratic socialists and social democrats both advocate the concept of the welfare state, to the extent that it protects and promotes the economic and social well-being of its citizens, including those unable to minimally provide for a good life. Whereas some modern social democrats are concerned with gradually improving the welfare state, irrespective of any hierarchies of power that may persist following welfare reforms, many modern democratic socialists view this as a means to an egalitarian end. Democratic socialists are committed to the ideas of the redistribution of wealth and power as well as social ownership of certain industries, concepts which are considered to be abandoned by Third Way social democrats. Highlighting this difference, contemporary advocates of the democratic socialist model have criticized the modern Third Way social democratic approach of a welfare state if it is not adequately providing socioeconomic welfare programs at the universal level.

While there are no countries in the world that would qualify as a democratic socialist state, i.e. as a democratic state having achieved a post-capitalist, socialist economy, several academics, political commentators, and scholars have distinguished between authoritarian socialist and democratic socialist states. The Soviet Bloc is considered as being authoritarian or non-democratic and as being socialist only constitutionally, while Western Bloc countries have been democratically governed by socialist parties including in Britain, France, Sweden. Those parties have pushed the ideals and objectives of socialism within the context of a democratic political system and capitalist economic system. In other countries, democratic socialism is defined more generally, essentially equating economic rights with human rights. United States Senator Bernie Sanders, a proponent of democratic socialism, has defined the term as universally guaranteeing rights to quality health care, sufficient education, employment at a living wage, affordable housing, secure retirement, and a clean environment. Toward these ends, he has invoked the words of Martin Luther King Jr., who also advocated democratic socialism in calling for "a better distribution of wealth".

==== Social democracy ====
Social democracy can be divided into classical and modern strands. Classical social democracy attempts to achieve socialism through gradual, parliamentary means and by introducing it from within democracy rather than through revolutionary means. The term social democracy can refer to the particular kind of society that social democrats advocate.

The Socialist International (SI), the worldwide organization of social democratic and democratic socialist parties, defines social democracy as an ideal form of representative democracy that may solve the problems found in a liberal democracy. The SI emphasizes principles such as freedom—not only individual liberties, but also freedom from discrimination and freedom from dependence on either the owners of the means of production or the holders of abusive political power—equality and social justice—not only before the law, but also economic and socio-cultural equality and equal opportunities for all, including those with physical, mental, or social disabilities; and solidarity—unity, and a sense of compassion for the victims of injustice and inequality.

Modern social democracy seeks to contain capitalism through transitioning unstable private sector enterprises into public ownership, correcting economic and social inequality through social safety nets and services, sometimes referred to as welfare state policies, and more aggressive regulation of markets and private enterprise than other forms of mixed economy. Over the past forty years, social democracy has increasingly been replaced with alternate economic systems such as the social market economy or Third Way mixed economies that are informed by Keynesian economics.

=== Eco-socialism ===
Merging aspects of Marxism, socialism, environmentalism, anarchism, and ecology, eco-socialists generally believe that the capitalist system is the cause of social exclusion, inequality and environmental degradation. Eco-socialists criticize many within the green movement for not going far enough in their critique of the current world system and for not being overtly anti-capitalist. At the same time, Eco-socialists blame the traditional Left for overlooking or not properly addressing ecological problems. Eco-socialists are anti-globalization. Joel Kovel sees globalization as a force driven by capitalism; in turn, the rapid economic growth encouraged by globalization causes acute ecological crises.

Eco-socialism goes beyond a criticism of the actions of large corporations and targets the inherent properties of capitalism. Such an analysis follows Marx's theories about the contradiction between use values and exchange values. As Kovel explains, within a market economy, goods are not produced to meet needs but are produced to be exchanged for money that are then used to acquire other goods. As we have to keep selling to keep buying, we must persuade others to buy our goods just to ensure our survival, which leads to the production of goods with no previous use that can be sold to sustain our ability to buy other goods. Eco-socialists like Kovel stress that this contradiction has reached a destructive level, where certain essential activities such as caring for relatives full-time and basic subsistence are unrewarded while unnecessary economic activities earn certain individuals huge fortunes. Agrarian socialism is another variant of eco-socialism.

=== Liberal socialism ===
Liberal socialism is a political philosophy that incorporates liberal principles into socialism. Liberal socialism refuses to abolish capitalism with a socialist economy and supports a mixed economy that includes both social ownership and private property in capital goods. This synthesis sees liberalism as the political theory that takes the inner freedom of the human spirit as a given and adopts liberty as the goal, means, and rule of shared human life. Socialism is seen as the method to realize this recognition of liberty through political and economic autonomy and emancipation from the grip of pressing material necessity. Principles that can be described as liberal socialist are based on the works of liberal, left-liberal, radical, socialist, and anarchist economists and philosophers. Liberal socialism has been particularly prominent in British and Italian politics. Liberal socialist Carlo Rosselli founded the liberal socialist-led anti-fascist resistance movement Giustizia e Libertà that later became an active combatant against the fascist regime in Italy during World War II and which included Ferruccio Parri, who was among Giustizia e Libertà's leaders.

==== Ethical socialism ====
Ethical socialism is a variant of liberal socialism developed by British socialists. It became an important ideology within the British Labour Party. Ethical socialism was founded in the 1920s by R. H. Tawney, a British Christian socialist, and its ideals were connected to Christian socialist, Fabian, and guild socialist ideals. Ethical socialism has been publicly supported by British Prime Ministers Ramsay MacDonald, Clement Attlee, and Tony Blair.

=== Libertarian socialism ===
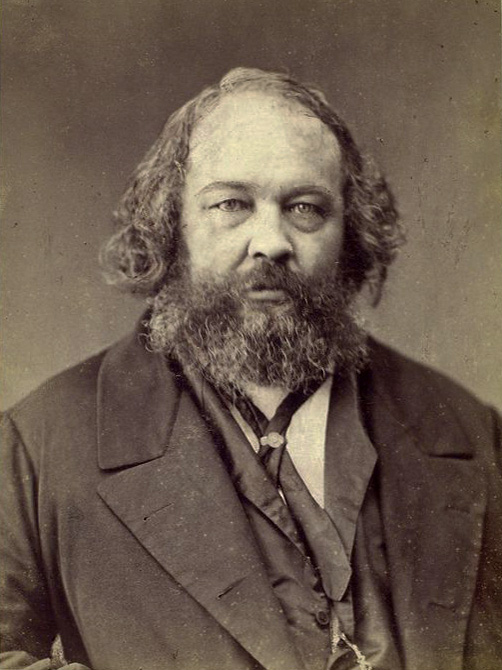
Mikhail Bakunin, leader of the libertarian socialist faction of the International Workingmen's Association

Libertarian socialism, sometimes called left-libertarianism, social anarchism, and socialist libertarianism, is a political philosophy within the socialist movement that rejects the view of socialism as state ownership or command of the means of production within a more general criticism of the state form itself, as well as of wage labour relationships within the workplace in the form of wage slavery. It emphasizes workers' self-management of the workplace and decentralized structures of political government, asserting that a society based on freedom and equality can be achieved through abolishing authoritarian institutions that control certain means of production and subordinate the majority to an owning class or political and economic elite. Libertarian socialists generally place their hopes in decentralized means of direct democracy and federal or confederal associations such as citizens' assemblies, libertarian municipalism, trade unions, and workers' councils. This is generally done within a general call for liberty and free association through the identification, criticism and practical dismantling of illegitimate authority in all aspects of human life.

Past and present political currents and movements commonly described as libertarian socialist include anarchism (anarchist communism, anarcho-syndicalism, collectivist anarchism, mutualism individualist anarchism) as well as autonomism, communalism, libertarian Marxism (council communism and Luxemburgism) participism, revolutionary syndicalism, and some versions of utopian socialism.

=== Regional socialism ===
Regional socialism includes left-wing nationalism, a type of socialism based upon social equality, popular sovereignty, and national self-determination, especially in relation to anti-imperialism and national liberation.

==== Abertzale left ====
Abertzale left (Basque: ezker abertzalea, "patriotic left"; translated in Spanish as izquierda nacionalista radical vasca, "Basque radical nationalist left") is a term used to refer to the parties or organizations of the Basque nationalist separatist left, stretching from social democracy to communism. This leftist character is highlighted in contrast to the traditional jeltzale nationalism represented by the Basque Nationalist Party (EAJ-PNV), a conservative and Christian-democratic party, which has long been the largest in the Basque Country. The first examples of abertzale parties are the Basque Nationalist Republican Party (EAAE-PRNV), active from 1909 to 1913, and the Basque Nationalist Action (EAE-ANV), active from 1930 to 2008. This was the political environment in which ETA was formed. More recently, in 1986, the abertzale left of the EAJ-PNV wing to form the social-democratic Basque Solidarity (EA) party.

Ezker abertzalea (Spanish: izquierda abertzale) is notably used when referring to the leftist-nationalist environment of Batasuna, an outlawed political party.

In 2011–2012, the main abertzale parties and groups joined forces in forming a succession of coalitions: Bildu, Amaiur and, finally, EH Bildu. A group of former members of Batasuna were identified by the media as independents of izquierda abertzale.

==== Democratic confederalism ====
Democratic confederalism, also known as Kurdish communalism or Apoism, is a political concept theorized by Kurdistan Workers' Party (PKK) leader Abdullah Öcalan about a system of democratic self-organization featuring a confederation based on the principles of autonomy, direct democracy, political ecology, feminism, multiculturalism, self-defense, self-governance, and elements of a cooperative economy. Öcalan reformulated the political objectives of the Kurdish liberation movement, abandoning the old statist and centralizing socialist project for a radical and renewed proposal for democratic-libertarian socialism that no longer aims at building an independent state separate from Turkey, but at establishing an autonomous, democratic, and decentralized entity based on the ideas of democratic confederalism.

==== Arab socialism ====
The Arab Socialist Ba'ath Party has ruled Syria under the Assad Family and Iraq under Saddam Hussein based on a tradition of secular, non-Marxist socialism. Ba'thist beliefs combine Arab socialism, nationalism, and pan-Arabism. The mostly secular ideology often contrasts with that of other Arab governments in the Middle East, which sometimes lean towards Islamism and theocracy. The Ba'athists have persecuted socialists in their own countries. In Iraq, the American Central Intelligence Agency assisted Iraq with a list of communists to eliminate. Socialist Lynn Walsh argues that the Iraqi Ba'athists promoted capitalists from within the party and outside the country.

The Arab Socialist Ba'ath Party, also known as the Ba'ath Party (Arabic: حزب البعث العربي الاشتراكي), is a secularist pan-Arabist political party that synthesizes Arab nationalism and Arab socialism. It opposes Western imperialism and calls for the ethnic "awakening" or "resurrection" of the Arab people into a single united state. Ba'ath, also spelled as Ba'th or Baath, means resurrection or renaissance. The party's motto, "Unity, Liberty, Socialism" (wahda, hurriya, ishtirakiya), was inspired by the French Jacobin political doctrine linking national unity and social equity. In the slogan, "unity" refers to Arab unity, "liberty" emphasizes being free from foreign control and interference, and "socialism" refers to Arab socialism, not European-style Marxism or communism.

The party was founded in Damascus, Syria, in 1940 by the Syrian intellectuals Michel Aflaq and Salah al-Bitar, and it has since established branches in different Arab countries, although the only countries it has ever held power in are Syria and Iraq. Aflaq and al-Bitar both studied at the Sorbonne in the early 1930s, at a time when centre-left positivism was still the dominant ideology amongst France's academic elite. The Ba'ath party included a significant number of Christian Arabs among its founding members. For them, a resolutely nationalist and secular political framework was a suitable way to avoid a faith-based Islamic orientation and to give non-Muslims full acknowledgement as citizens.

In 1955, a coup d'état by the military against the historical leadership of Aflaq and al-Bitar led the Syrian and Iraqi parties to split into rival organizations—the Qutriyun (Regionalist) Syria-based party and the Qawmiyuri (Nationalist) Iraq-based party. Both Ba'ath parties kept their names and maintained parallel structures, but became so antagonistic that the Syrian Ba'ath government became the only Arab government to support non-Arab Iran against Iraq during the Iran–Iraq War. In Syria, the Ba'ath Party has had a monopoly on political power since the party's 1963 coup. Ba'athists seized power in Iraq in 1963, but were deposed months later. They returned to power in a 1968 coup and remained the sole party of government until the 2003 Iraq invasion. Since then, the party has been banned in Iraq.

==== Chinese and Vietnamese nationalist socialism ====
The Kuomintang Party (Chinese National People's Party or Chinese Nationalist Party) was founded in the Republic of China in 1912 by Sun Yatsen, a proponent of Chinese nationalism, who founded Revive China Society in Honolulu, Hawaii, in 1894. Kuomintang ideology features Three Principles of the People, which are nationalism, democracy, and socialism. The party has adopted a One-China policy, arguing that there is only one state called China, and that the Republic of China, not the People's Republic of China, is its legitimate government. The party has had conflicts with the Chinese Communist Party. Since 2008, in order to ease tensions with the PRC, the party has endorsed the "Three Noes" policy as defined by Ma Ying-jeou, namely no unification, no independence, and no use of force.

The Kuomintang attempted to levy taxes upon merchants in Canton and the merchants resisted by raising an army, the Merchant's Volunteer Corps. The merchants were conservative and reactionary and their leader Chen Lianbao was a prominent comprador trader. Chiang Kai-shek led his army of Whampoa Military Academy graduates to defeat the merchant's army. He was assisted by Soviet advisors, who supplied him with weapons, while the merchants were supplied with weapons from the Western countries. The British led an international flotilla to support the merchants. Chiang seized the Western-supplied weapons from the merchants, and battled against them. A Kuomintang general executed several merchants, and the Kuomintang formed a Soviet-inspired Revolutionary Committee. The Kuomintang's economic and military campaign against merchants continued for many years. Chiang also enforced an anti-Japanese boycott, sending agents to sack the shops of those who sold Japanese-made items, fining them.

As a part of the post-war settlement that ended the First Indochina War, Vietnam was partitioned into two zones. The remnants of the VNQDĐ fled to the anti-communist south, where they remained until the Fall of Saigon in 1975 and the reunification of Vietnam under communist rule.

=== Religious socialism ===
Religious socialism is any form of socialism based on religious values. Members of several major religions have found that their beliefs about human society fit with socialist principles and ideas. As a result, religious socialist movements have developed within these religions.

==== Buddhist socialism ====
Buddhist socialism is a political ideology which advocates socialism based on the principles of Buddhism. Both Buddhism and socialism seek to provide an end to suffering by analyzing its conditions and removing its main causes through praxis. Both also seek to provide a transformation of personal consciousness—spiritual and political, respectively—to bring an end to human alienation and selfishness. People who have been described as Buddhist socialists include Buddhadasa Bhikkhu, B. R. Ambedkar, S. W. R. D. Bandaranaike, Han Yong-un, Takagi Kenmyō, Seno’o Girō, U Nu, Uchiyama Gudō, and Norodom Sihanouk.

Bhikkhu Buddhadasa coined the phrase "Dhammic socialism". He believed that socialism is a natural state, meaning all things exist together in one system. Han Yong-un felt that equality was one of the main principles of Buddhism. In an interview published in 1931, Yong-un spoke of his desire to explore Buddhist socialism: "I am recently planning to write about Buddhist socialism. Just like there is Christian socialism as a system of ideas in Christianity, there must be also Buddhist socialism in Buddhism".

Tenzin Gyatso, the Fourteenth Dalai Lama of Tibet, has said that "[o]f all the modern economic theories, the economic system of Marxism is founded on moral principles, while capitalism is concerned only with gain and profitability. [...] The failure of the regime in the former Soviet Union was, for me, not the failure of Marxism but the failure of totalitarianism. For this reason I still think of myself as half-Marxist, half-Buddhist".

==== Christian socialism ====
Many individuals and groups have professed to be both Christian and socialist, such as Frederick Denison Maurice, author of The Kingdom of Christ, and the Christian Socialist Movement (UK) (CSM), affiliated with the British Labour Party. Distributism is a third-way economic philosophy formulated by Catholic thinkers such as G. K. Chesterton and Hilaire Belloc to apply the principles of social justice articulated by the Roman Catholic Church, especially in Pope Leo XIII's encyclical Rerum novarum.

Various Catholic clerical parties have at times referred to themselves as Christian Social. Two examples are the Christian Social Party of Karl Lueger in Austria before and after World War I, and the contemporary Christian Social Union in Bavaria. These parties have never espoused socialist policies and have always stood at the conservative side of Christian Democracy. Hugo Chávez of Venezuela was an advocate of a form of Christian socialism as he claims that Jesus Christ was a socialist.

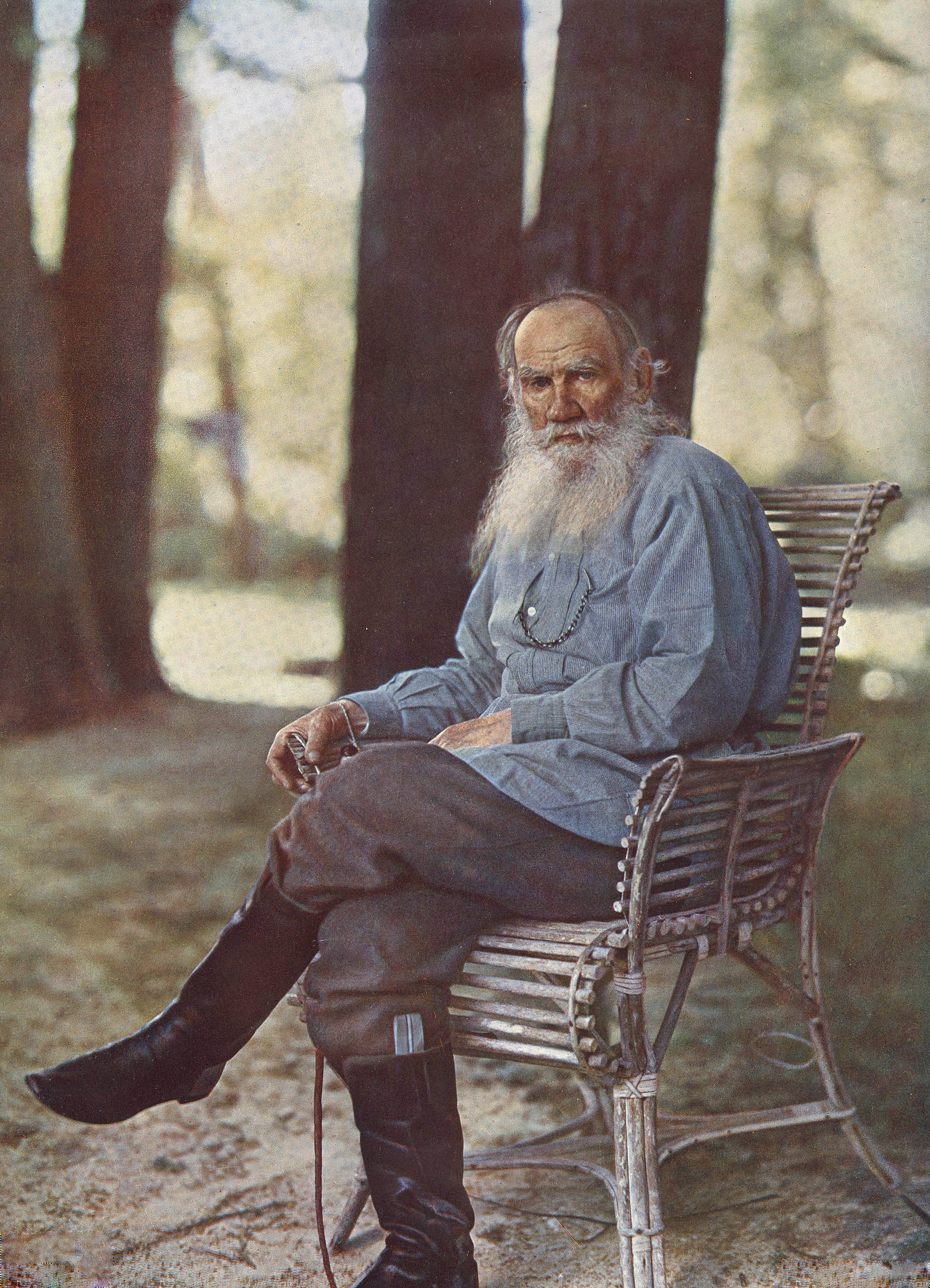
Leo Tolstoy

Christian anarchism is a movement in political theology that combines anarchism and Christianity. The foundation of Christian anarchism is a rejection of violence, with Leo Tolstoy's The Kingdom of God Is Within You regarded as a key text. Tolstoy sought to separate Russian Orthodox Christianity from what he believed was the true message of Jesus as contained in the Gospels, specifically in the Sermon on the Mount. Tolstoy took the viewpoint that all governments that wage war, and churches that in turn support those governments, are an affront to the Christian principles of non-violence and non-resistance. Although Tolstoy never actually used the term Christian anarchism in The Kingdom of God Is Within You, reviews of the book following its publication in 1894 appear to have coined the term.

Christian anarchist groups have included the Doukhobors, Catholic Worker Movement, and the Brotherhood Church.

Christian communism is a form of religious communism based on Christianity. It is a theological and political theory based upon the view that the teachings of Jesus Christ compel Christians to support communism as the ideal social system. Many Christian communists assert that evidence from the Bible (in the Acts of the Apostles) suggests that the first Christians, including the apostles, established their own small communist society in the years following Jesus' death and resurrection. As such, many advocates of Christian communism argue that it was taught by Jesus and practiced by the apostles themselves, an argument supported by some independent historians.

==== Islamic socialism ====
Muslim socialists believe that the teachings of the Quran and Muhammad—especially the zakat—are compatible with principles of socialism. They draw inspiration from the early Medinan welfare state established by Muhammad. Muslim socialists found their roots in anti-imperialism. Muslim socialist leaders believe in the derivation of legitimacy from the public.

==== Jewish socialism ====
The Jewish left consists of Jews who identify with, or support, left-wing or liberal causes, consciously as Jews, either as individuals or through organizations. However, there is no one organization or movement that constitutes the Jewish left. Jews have been major forces in the history of the labor movement, the settlement house movement, the women's rights movement, anti-racist and anti-colonialist work, and anti-fascist and anti-capitalist organizations of many forms in Europe, the United States, Algeria, Iraq, Ethiopia, and modern-day Israel. Jews have a rich history of involvement in anarchism, socialism, Marxism, and Western liberalism. Although the expression "on the left" covers a range of politics, many well-known figures "on the left" have been Jews who were born into Jewish families and who have various connectiosn to Jewish communities, Jewish culture, Jewish tradition, or the Jewish religion.

Labor Zionism or socialist Zionism (Hebrew: צִיּוֹנוּת סוֹצְיָאלִיסְטִית, translit. Tziyonut sotzyalistit; Hebrew: תְּנוּעָת הָעַבוֹדָה translit. Tnu'at ha'avoda, i.e. The labor movement) is the left wing of the Zionist movement.

Labor Zionism grew in size and influence and eclipsed "political Zionism" by the 1930s both internationally and within the British Mandate of Palestine, where Labor Zionists predominated among many of the institutions of the pre-independence Jewish community Yishuv, particularly the trade union federation known as the Histadrut. The Haganah, the largest Zionist paramilitary defense force, was a Labor Zionist institution and was used on occasion against right-wing political opponents or to assist the British Administration in capturing rival Jewish militants. Labor Zionists played a leading role in the 1948 Arab–Israeli War and Labor Zionists were predominant among the leadership of the Israeli military for decades after the formation of the state of Israel in 1948.

Major theoreticians of the Labor Zionist movement included Moses Hess, Nachman Syrkin, Ber Borochov, and Aaron David Gordon. Leading figures in the movement included David Ben-Gurion, Golda Meir, and Berl Katznelson.

=== Syndicalism ===
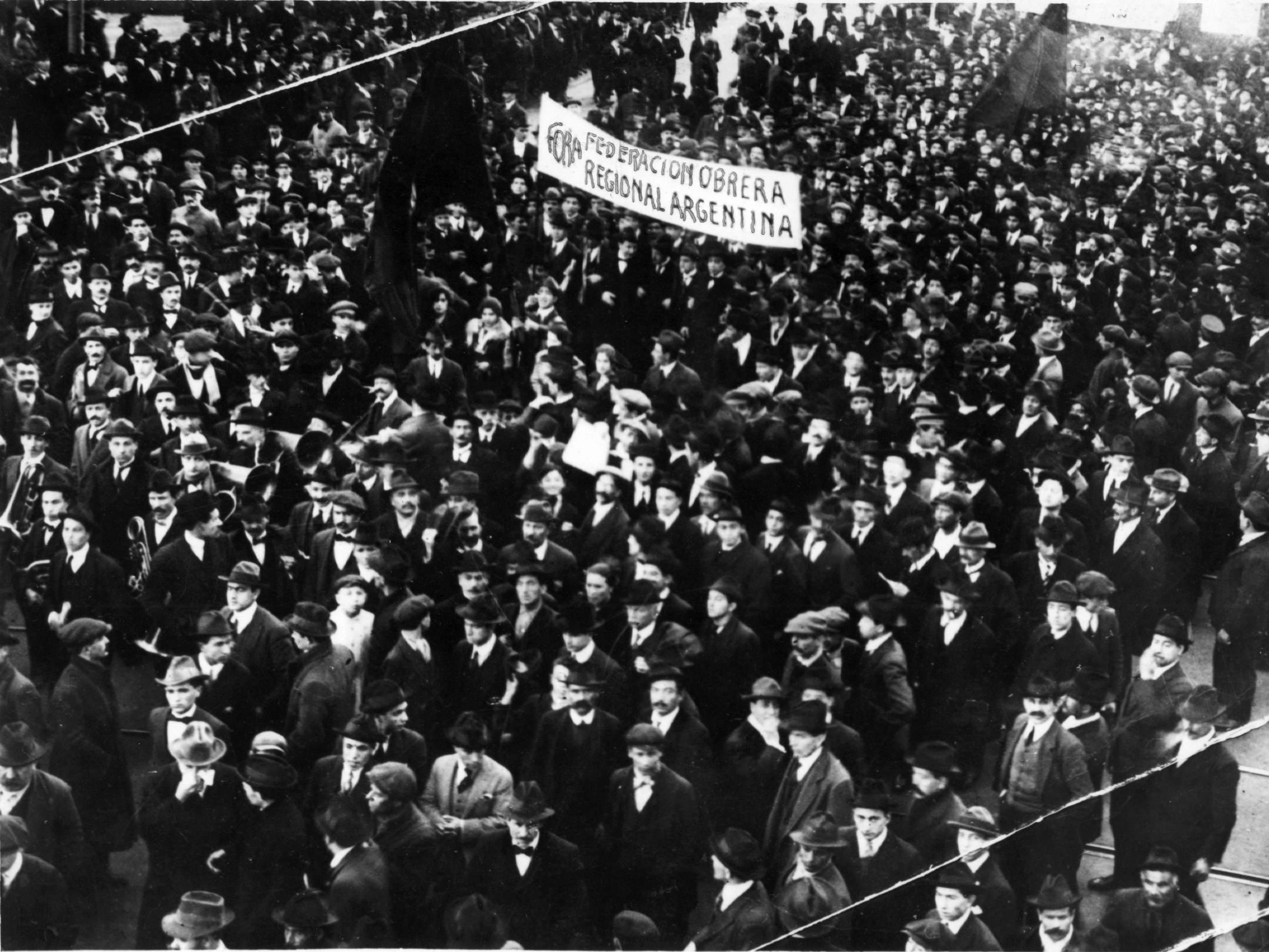
Demonstration by the Argentine syndicalist union FORA in 1915

Syndicalism is a radical current in the labor movement that was most active in the early 20th century. Its main idea is the establishment of local worker-based organizations and the advancement of the demands and rights of workers through strikes. According to the Marxist historian Eric Hobsbawm, it was predominant in the revolutionary left in the decade which preceded the outbreak of World War I because Marxism was mostly reformist at that time.

A number of syndicalist organizations have been linked in the International Workers' Association and the International Confederation of Labor.

== See also ==
- Anarchism
- Anarchist economics
- Anarchist schools of thought
- Authoritarian socialism
- Christian socialism
- Communism
- Democratic socialism
- Ethical socialism
- History of anarchism
- History of communism
- History of socialism
- Labour movement
- "The labor problem"
- Left-libertarianism
- Liberal socialism
- Libertarianism
- Libertarian socialism
- List of communist ideologies
- Market socialism
- Marxian economics
- Marxism
- Marxist schools of thought
- Mutualism (economic theory)
- Reformism
- Revolutionary socialism
- Social democracy
- Socialism
- Socialist economics
- Socialist mode of production
- Socialist state
- State socialism
- Syndicalism
- Why Socialism? – an article written by Albert Einstein which presented a critique of modern capitalism and advocated for a planned economy
