= Ethical socialism =

Type of socialism emphasizing ethics

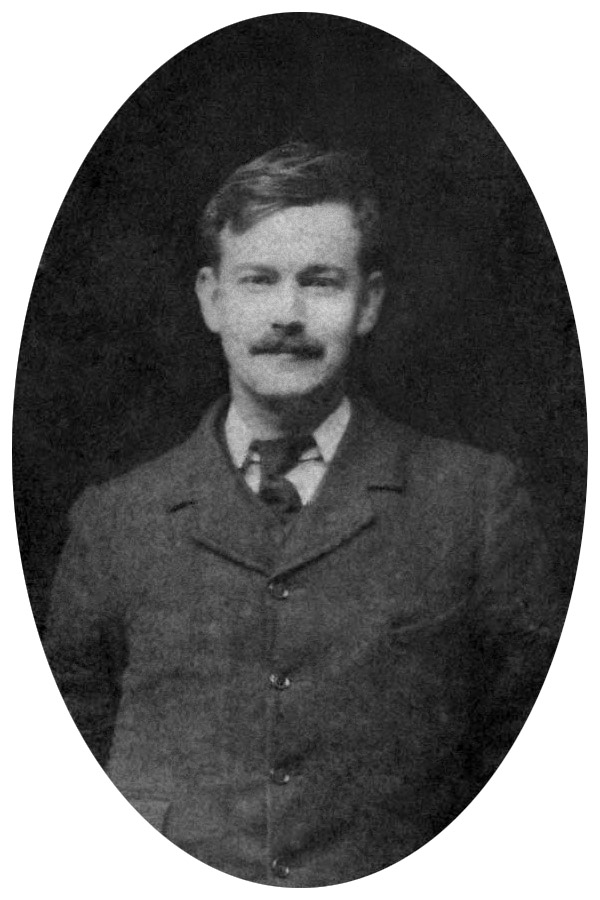
R. H. Tawney, a historian and proponent of ethical socialism

Ethical socialism is a political ideology and philosophy that appeals to socialism on ethical and moral grounds as opposed to consumeristic, economic, and egoistic grounds. It emphasizes the need for a morally conscious economy based upon the principles of altruism, cooperation, and social justice while opposing possessive individualism.

In contrast to socialism inspired by historical materialism, Marxist theory, and neoclassical economics which base their appeals for socialism on grounds of economic efficiency, or historical inevitability, ethical socialism focuses on the moral and ethical reasons for advocating socialism. It became the official philosophy of several socialist parties.

Ethical socialism has some significant overlap with Christian socialism, Fabianism, guild socialism, liberal socialism, social-democratic reformism, and utopian socialism. Under the influence of politicians like Carlo Rosselli in Italy, social democrats began disassociating themselves from orthodox Marxism altogether as represented by Marxism–Leninism, embracing an ethical liberal socialism, Keynesianism, and emphasizing morality.

As conceived by one of its founders, Keir Hardie, Ethical Socialism was to be "a socialism built bottom up, winning over hearts and minds, prefiguring the future, and setting up co-operatives. The ILP aimed to turn England into 'one vast cooperative.'" Ethical Socialism is often confused with a more conservative variant which originated in the 1950s in Germany, which is different than the movement embodied by the Independent Labour Party which, according to the Quaker Socialist Society, was" based on spontaneity and comradeship in the struggle to defeat capitalism and establish an ethical-socialist society. Its motto was friendliness and co-operation and it looked forward to a country where most enterprises and organisations were run as co-operatives. As far as international affairs were concerned, the ethical socialism of the ILP looked forward to the unity of humanity and the subordination of national states to some world co-ordinating body, or even some decentralised world government. The essence of this ethical socialism was humanitarianism."

Social democracy, which is distinct from Ethical Socialism, made appeals to communitarian, corporatist, and sometimes nationalist sentiments while rejecting the economic and technological determinism generally characteristic of both economic liberalism and orthodox Marxism.

== Overview ==
Ethical socialism can be traced back to the utopian socialists, especially Henri de Saint-Simon and Charles Fourier, but also anarchists such as the French socialist Pierre-Joseph Proudhon as well as Italian revolutionaries and socialists such as Giuseppe Garibaldi and Giuseppe Mazzini. Those utopian socialists, one of the first currents of modern socialist thought, presented visions and outlines for imaginary or futuristic ideal societies, characterized by the establishment of a moral economy, with positive ideals based on moral and ethical grounds being the main reason for moving society in such a direction. Before Marxists established a hegemony over definitions of socialism, the term socialism was a broad concept which referred to one or more of various theories aimed at solving the labour problem through radical changes in the capitalist economy. Descriptions of the problem, explanations of its causes and proposed solutions such as the abolition of private property or supporting cooperatives and public ownership varied among socialist philosophies.

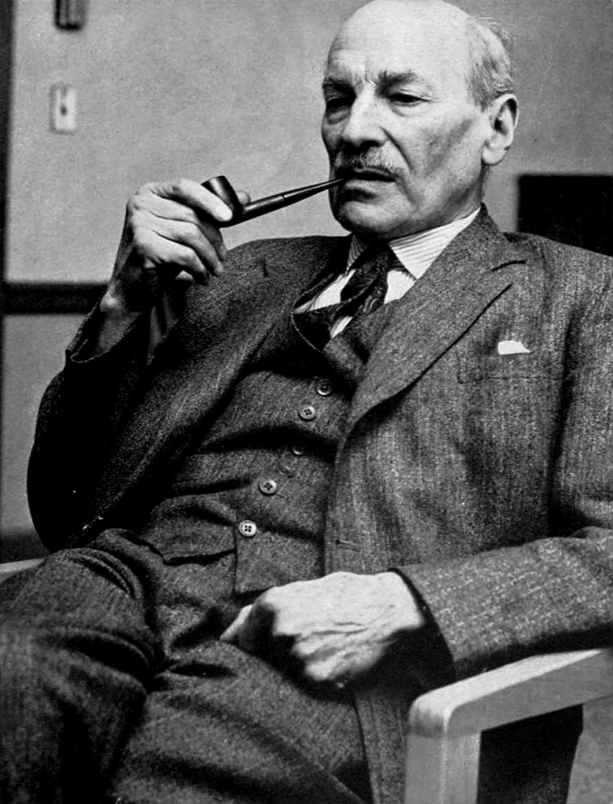
Clement Attlee, prime minister of the United Kingdom (1945–1951)

There is a myth that ethical socialism initially originated as a pejorative by the Marxian economist Rosa Luxemburg against Marxist revisionist Eduard Bernstein and his socialist reformist supporters, who evoked neo-Kantian liberal ideals and ethical arguments in favour of socialism, but ethical socialism is inspired by Bernstein's ethical arguments. Self-recognized ethical socialists soon arose in Britain such as the Christian socialist R. H. Tawney and its ideals were connected to Christian socialist, Fabian, and guild socialist ideals. Ethical socialism was an important ideology within the British Labour Party. Ethical socialism has been publicly supported by British prime ministers Ramsay MacDonald, Clement Attlee, and Tony Blair. While Blair described New Labour as a return to ethical socialism, several critics accused him of completely abandoning socialism in favour of capitalism.

Ethical socialism had a profound impact on the social democratic movement and reformism during the later half of the 20th century, particularly in Great Britain. Ethical socialism is distinct in its focus on criticism of the ethics of capitalism and not merely criticism of the economic, systemic, and material issues of capitalism. When the Social Democratic Party of Germany (SPD) renounced orthodox Marxism during the Godesberg Program in the 1950s, ethical socialism became the official philosophy within the SPD. The decision to abandon the traditional anti-capitalist policy upset many in the SPD who had supported it. Some such as Ian Adams also argue that this was an abandonment of the classical conception of socialism as involving the replacement of the capitalist economic system and make a distinction between classical socialism and liberal socialism.

== Themes ==
R. H. Tawney denounced self-seeking amoral and immoral behaviour that he claimed is supported by capitalism. Tawney opposed what he called the "acquisitive society" that causes private property to be used to transfer surplus profit to "functionless owners", i.e. capitalist rentiers. However, he did not denounce managers as a whole, believing that management and employees could join in a political alliance for reform. Tawney supported the pooling of surplus profit through means of progressive taxation to redistribute these funds to provide social welfare (including public health care, public education, and public housing) and the nationalization of strategic industries and services. He supported worker participation in the business of management in the economy as well as consumer, employee, employer and state cooperation in regulating the economy.

Although Tawney supported a substantial role for public enterprise in the economy, he stated that where private enterprise provided a service that was commensurate with its rewards that was functioning as private property, then a business could be usefully and legitimately be left in private hands. Thomas Hill Green supported the right of equal opportunity for all individuals to be able freely appropriate property, but claimed that acquisition of wealth did not imply that an individual could do whatever they wanted to once that wealth was in their possession. Green opposed "property rights of the few" that were preventing the ownership of property by the many.

Ethical socialism was advocated and promoted by former British prime minister Tony Blair, who has been influenced by John Macmurray, himself influenced by Green. Blair has defined ethical socialism with similar notions promoted by earlier ethical socialists such as emphasis on the common good, rights, and responsibilities, and support of an organic society in which individuals flourish through cooperation. According to Blair, the Labour Party ran into problems in the 1960s and 1970s when it abandoned ethical socialism and believes that the party's recovery required a return to the ethical socialist values last promoted by the Attlee government. However, Blair's critics (both inside and outside Labour) have accused him of completely abandoning socialism in favour of capitalism.

== See also ==
- Communitarianism
- Democratic socialism
- Gaitskellism
- Holistic community
- Human dignity
- Moral economy
- Post-war consensus
- Social corporatism
- Social market economy
- Social mobility
- Third Way
- Types of socialism
