= Godesberg Program =

1959 German Social Democratic Party platform

- Original title: Godesberger Programm
- Ratified: 15 November 1959
- Location: Bad Godesberg
- Signatories: Social Democratic Party of Germany
- Subject: Social democracy
- Purpose: a fundamental change in the orientation and goals of the SPD

The Godesberg Program (German: Godesberger Programm) of the Social Democratic Party of Germany (SPD) was ratified in 1959 at a convention in the town of Bad Godesberg near Bonn. It represented a fundamental change in the orientation and goals of the SPD endorsing social democratic policies, while adopting a commitment a mass party orientation that appealed to ethical rather than class-based considerations. It also rejected nationalization as a major principle of socialism.

== Overview ==
The Godesberg Program eliminated the party's remaining orthodox Marxist policies and the SPD redefined its ideology as freiheitlicher Sozialismus (liberal socialism). With the adoption of the Godesberg Program, it renounced orthodox Marxist class conflict and economic determinism. The SPD replaced it with an ethical socialism based on humanism and emphasized that it was democratic, pragmatic and reformist. The most controversial decision of the Godesberg Program was its declaration stating that private ownership of the means of production "can claim protection by society as long as it does not hinder the establishment of social justice".

By accepting social democratic principles, the SPD argued that a market must, in fact, be regulated so as to not degenerate into oligarchy. This policy also meant the endorsement of Keynesian economic management, social welfare and a degree of economic planning. Some argue that this was an abandonment of the classical conception of socialism as involving the replacement of the capitalist economic system. It declared that the SPD "no longer considered nationalization the major principle of a socialist economy but only one of several (and then only the last) means of controlling economic concentration of power of key industries" while also committing the SPD to an economic stance which promotes "as much competition as possible, as much planning as necessary". The decision to abandon the traditional anti-capitalist policy angered many in the SPD who had supported it.

After those changes, the SPD enacted the two major pillars of what would become the modern social-democratic program, namely making the party a people's party rather than a party solely representing the working class and abandoning remaining Marxist policies aimed at destroying capitalism and replacing them with policies aimed at reforming capitalism. The Godesberg Program divorced its conception of socialism from Marxism, declaring that democratic socialism in Europe was "rooted in Christian ethics, humanism, and classical philosophy". The Godesberg Program was a major revision of the SPD's policies and gained attention from beyond Germany. At the time of its adoption, the stance on the Godesberg Program in neighbouring France was not uniform. While the French Section of the Workers' International was divided on the Godesberg Program, the Unified Socialist Party denounced the Godesberg Program as a renunciation of socialism and an opportunistic reaction to the SPD's electoral defeats.

The Godesberg program was also notable because the party abandoned and rejected Marxist theories of class conflict and revolution. This was consistent with Eduard Bernstein's Marxist revisionism. In adopting the Godesberg Program, the SPD dropped its hostility to capitalism which had long been the core of party ideology and sought to move beyond its old working class base to embrace the full spectrum of potential voters, adopting a political ideology grounded in ethical appeals. Nonetheless, they adhered to the Marxist analysis put forward by social democrats such as Bernstein that socialism would arise as a result of the evolution of capitalism. In this sense, the Godesberg Program has been seen as involving the final victory of the reformist agenda of Bernstein over the orthodox Marxist agenda of Karl Kautsky.

Labor unions had abandoned the old demands for nationalization and instead cooperated increasingly with industry, achieving labor representation on corporate boards and increases in wages and benefits. After losing federal elections in 1953 and 1957, the SPD moved toward an American-style image-driven electoral strategy that stressed personalities, specifically Berlin mayor Willy Brandt. As it prepared for the 1961 federal election, it proved necessary as well to drop opposition to rearmament and to accept NATO. The Godesberg Program was superseded in 1989 by the Berlin Program, resolved at the party congress held on 20 December 1989 in Berlin.

== See also ==
- Gaitskellism
- Willi Eichler
- Ethical socialism
- The Future of Socialism
- Gotha Program
- Social democracy
- Reformism

== Sources ==
- Adams, Ian (2001). Political Ideology Today. Politics Today (2nd reprint, revised ed.). Manchester, England: Manchester University Press. ISBN 9780719060199.
- Berman, Sheri (2006). The Primacy of Politics: Social Democracy and the Making of Europe's Twentieth Century. Cambridge, Massachusetts: Cambridge University Press. ISBN 9780521817998.
- Orlow, Dietrich (2000). Common Destiny: A Comparative History of the Dutch, French, and German Social Democratic Parties, 1945–1969 (illustrated, reprinted ed.). New York City, New York: Berghahn Books. ISBN 9781571811851.
- Hampton, Mary N. (1986). Hampton, Mary N.; Søe, Christian (eds.). Between Bonn and Berlin: German Politics Adrift? (illustrated ed.). Lanham, Maryland: Rowman & Littlefield. ISBN 9780847690091.
- Egle, Christoph; Henkes, Christian; Merkel, Wolfgang; Petring, Alexander (2008). Social Democracy in Power: The Capacity to Reform (illustrated ed.). London: Routledge. ISBN 9781134071791.
- Turner, Henry Ashby (1987). The Two Germanies Since 1945 (illustrated ed.). New Haven, Connecticut: Yale University Press. ISBN 9780300038651.
