= The Soul of Man Under Socialism =

1891 essay by Oscar Wilde

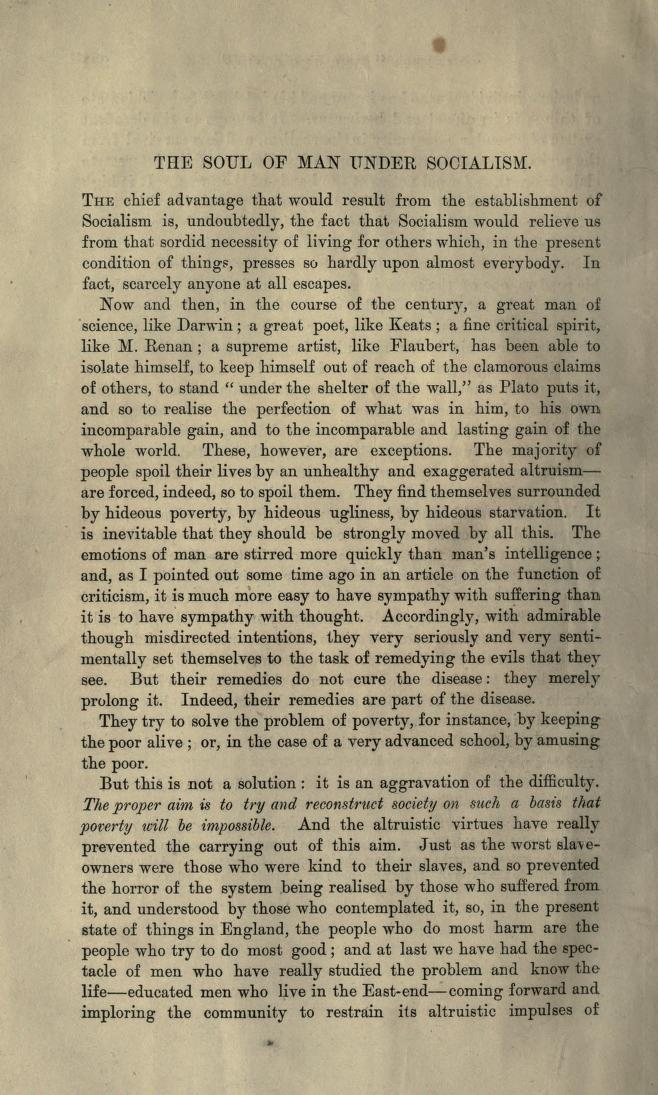
"The Soul of Man Under Socialism." First publication in Fortnightly Review February 1891, p. 292

"The Soul of Man Under Socialism" is an 1891 essay by Oscar Wilde in which he expounds a libertarian socialist worldview and a critique of charity. The writing of "The Soul of Man" followed Wilde's conversion to anarchist philosophy, following his reading of the works of Peter Kropotkin.

In "The Soul of Man" Wilde argues that, under capitalism, "the majority of people spoil their lives by an unhealthy and exaggerated altruism—are forced, indeed, so to spoil them": instead of realising their true talents, they waste their time solving the social problems caused by capitalism, without taking their common cause away. Thus, caring people "seriously and very sentimentally set themselves to the task of remedying the evils that they see in poverty but their remedies do not cure the disease: they merely prolong it" because, as Wilde puts it, "the proper aim is to try and reconstruct society on such a basis that poverty will be impossible."

== Overview ==
Wilde did not see kindness or altruism per se as a problem; what worried him was its misapplication in a way which leaves unaddressed the roots of the problem: "the altruistic virtues have really prevented the carrying out of this aim. Just as the worst slave-owners were those who were kind to their slaves, and so prevented the horror of the system being realised by those who suffered from it, and understood by those who contemplated it, so, in the present state of things in England, the people who do most harm are the people who try to do most good" while preserving the system.

With the abolition of private property, then, we shall have true, beautiful, healthy Individualism. Nobody will waste his life in accumulating things, and the symbols for things. One will live. To live is the rarest thing in the world. Most people exist, that is all.

— Oscar Wilde, "The Soul of Man under Socialism," 1891

Wilde's deepest concern was with man's soul; when he analysed poverty and its causes and effects in "The Soul of Man under Socialism" it was not simply the material well-being of the poor that distressed him, but how society does not allow them to reach a form of self-understanding and enlightenment. He adopted Jesus of Nazareth as a symbol of the supreme individualist. Wilde advocated socialism, which, he argued, "will be of value simply because it will lead to individualism" and "substituting co-operation for competition, will restore society to its proper condition of a thoroughly healthy organism, and ensure material well being for each member of the community."

Juliet Jacques has noted that the essay does not make any suggestions regarding political action to bring about socialism: rather it discusses the possible life of artists in a hypothetical socialist society in which private property had been abolished. Wilde examined the political conditions necessary for full self-development and devotion to art, arguing, "Art is individualism, and individualism is a disturbing and disintegrating force. There lies its immense value. For what it seeks to disturb is monotony of type, slavery of custom, tyranny of habit, and the reduction of man to the level of a machine." He observed that in contemporary Victorian capitalist society, a small minority of men such as Lord Byron, Percy Bysshe Shelley, Robert Browning, Charles Baudelaire and Victor Hugo "have been able to realise their personality more or less completely" because they had access to private wealth and therefore had no need to engage in wage labour. He argued that the abolition of private property would lead to a society in which individuals would focus on personal growth instead of the accumulation of wealth.

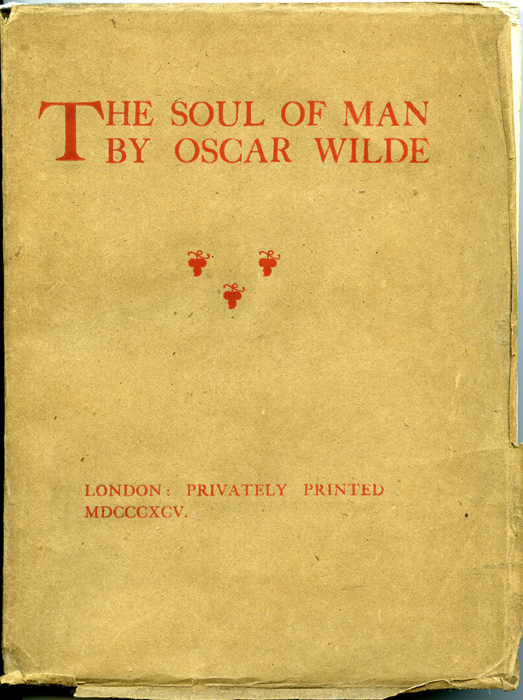
1895 book edition under the truncated title The Soul of Man, "privately printed" in 50 copies at Chiswick Press, 30 May 1895, five days after Wilde's conviction for gross indecency.

He made a point of differentiating "individual" socialism from "authoritarian" (government-centered) socialism, advocating a more libertarian approach, "What is needed is Individualism. If the Socialism is Authoritarian; if there are Governments armed with economic power as they are now with political power; if, in a word, we are to have Industrial Tyrannies, then the last state of man will be worse than the first."

In a socialist society, people will have the possibility to realise their talents; "each member of the society will share in the general prosperity and happiness of the society." Wilde added that "upon the other hand, Socialism itself will be of value simply because it will lead to individualism" since individuals will no longer need to fear poverty or starvation. This individualism would, in turn, protect against governments leveraging their power over their citizens. However, Wilde advocated non-capitalist individualism: "of course, it might be said that the Individualism generated under conditions of private property is not always, or even as a rule, of a fine or wonderful type" a critique which is "quite true." In this way socialism, in Wilde's imagination, would free men from manual labour and allow them to devote their time to creative pursuits, thus developing their soul. He ended by declaring "The new individualism is the new hellenism". Jacques has argued that Wilde's critique of capitalism is primarily focused on its inhibition of creativity rather than its exacerbation of inequality, and that as such it is part of a strain of socialist thought which can be extended back to the utopian socialist Charles Fourier and forward to the Situationists.

Wilde showed a strong libertarian streak as shown in his poem "Sonnet to Liberty" and, subsequent to reading the works of the anarchist communist Peter Kropotkin (whom he described as "a man with a soul of that beautiful white Christ which seems coming out of Russia"), he declared himself an anarchist. Kropotkin in turn was an admirer of Wilde's work: in correspondence with Robbie Ross, he wrote of the "deepest interest and sympathy" in the anarchist movement for Wilde, and stated that "The Soul of Man Under Socialism" included words "worth being engraved".

For anarchist historian George Woodcock, "Wilde's aim in 'The Soul of Man Under Socialism' is to seek the society most favorable to the artist. ... for Wilde art is the supreme end, containing within itself enlightenment and regeneration, to which all else in society must be subordinated. ... Wilde represents the anarchist as aesthete." Woodcock called the essay "the most ambitious contribution to literary anarchism during the 1890s" and finds that it is influenced mainly by the thought of William Godwin.

Political philosopher Slavoj Žižek shares Wildean sentiments and intellectual contempt for charity, noting that the problem of poverty will never be solved simply by keeping poor people alive, quoting the relevant passages from Wilde's essay in his lectures and book.

== Editions ==
- Oscar Wilde, Complete Works of Oscar Wilde, 5th ed, (London: Collins, 2003), ISBN 978-0-00-714436-5, pages 1174–1197. (The fifth edition is the current corrected version of the "Centenary Edition" [fourth edition] of the Collins Complete Works; for the first time in 1999, the Centenary Edition corrected the position of a fairly long paragraph that was out of place; the paragraph is misplaced in most modern editions before the year 2000).
- Oscar Wilde, The Complete Works of Oscar Wilde. Volume IV: Criticism: Historical Criticism, Intentions, The Soul of Man, Josephine M. Guy, ed. (Oxford: Oxford University Press, 2007), ISBN 978-0-19-811961-6, pages 231-268. (The OUP's variorum edition retains the misplaced paragraph in its original position, however).

== See also ==
- Anarchism and the arts
