= The labor problem =

Economics term with various applications

"The labor problem" is the economics term widely used toward the turn of the 20th century with various applications. It has been defined in many ways, such as "the problem of improving the conditions of employment of the wage-earning classes".

The labor problem encompasses the difficulties faced by wage-earners and employers who began to cut wages for various reasons including increased technology, desire for lower costs or to stay in business. The wage-earning classes responded with strikes, by unionizing and by committing acts of outright violence. It was a nationwide problem that spanned nearly all industries and helped contribute to modern business conditions still seen today. Possible causes include the failure to account for the negative externality of reproduction in the face of finite natural resources which results in over-supply of labor and falling living standards for wage-laborers, depersonalization by machines and poor working conditions.

== Time frame ==
A popular debate about the labor problem is the time that it encompasses. Some characterize it back as far as the 1860s, which is when many unions and groups began to form. However, there wasn't a problem present at this time with the formation of these unions. Also, the first strike was a result of the problem between wage earners and union officials, not employers and unions or employers and wage-earners, which was the main conflict of this time.

Since the problem was within unions and not between unions and employers, the Labor Problem had not yet become an issue. Many also attribute the end of the problem to the end of the 1920s. This has some merit but is also open to interpretation. Reforms began to pass to correct many of the problems but reforms continued to pass well into the 1930s, 1940s and 1950s. The civil rights movement took over in the United States, which brought about even further legislation. Many attribute the end of the labor problem to the late 1920s because it marks a significant drop in strikes and violence and an increase in passed legislation aimed at correcting the labor issues.

== Causes ==
At the turn of the century, machines were beginning to take a stronger footing in the economy, which drove costs down. Always trying to maximize profits, employers saw fit to lower wages for two main reasons. Machines were making the production process cheaper meaning wages took up a bigger percentage of costs, and when times were particularly tough, it made sense to cut wages to stay in business.

This depersonalization of the production process meant that people essentially became expendable. People were not eliminated but there was a significant job loss. This led to lower wages in the long run because fixed costs decreased (with increased technology) so employers saw fit to cut wage expenses for this now partially expendable labor force. Although the problem spanned many industries, they were not all concerned with the same problems. For example, the steel industry was mainly concerned with being phased out due to technological advances while other industries, namely textiles, had problems with child labor and working conditions. The variety of problems and concerns led to legislation being passed, which covered different areas and led to greater reform.

== Notable events ==
Riots broke out in Baltimore in 1877 due to the negligence of union officials. It began as a railroad strike but eventually formed riots that lasted four days and killed fifty people. The first strike due to depersonalization by machines was the Homestead Strike in 1892 on the Carnegie Steel Company by the Amalgamated Association of Iron and Steel Workers (AA). This ultimately resulted in the attempted assassination of Henry Clay Frick, Chairman of The Carnegie Steel Company, and a crushing blow in the attempt to unionize steel workers.

Another example is the Pullman Strike in 1894, where almost 4,000 workers who were members of the American Railway Union (ARU) went on a strike without permission of the union to protest wage cuts by the Pullman Company. One extreme example occurred when train engineers and laborer stopped a train before it reached the station in New York City, stranding men, women and children alike in the heat.

== Effects ==
Legislation like the Wagner Act (1935) and the Fair Labor Standards Act (1938) were passed which forced employers to participate in collective bargaining and presented a minimum wage respectively. Child Labor laws have also been reformed, limiting the age at which children can begin work and what type of work they can perform. The Department of Labor was established in 1913.

While some pieces of legislation like the aforementioned Wagner Act and Fair Labor Standards Act were not passed until the 1930s, their roots trace back to this Labor Problem at the turn of the century when demand for reform was growing in popularity. Many aspects of modern business like an established 40-hour work week, overtime pay, collective bargaining and safer working conditions among numerous other reforms can all trace their roots back to this time period and the legislation passed to correct it.

== See also ==
- Labor history of the United States
- Labor unrest
- Socialism
- Timeline of labor issues and events
