= Karl Anders =

German journalist and publisher (born 1907)

- Born: Kurt Wilhelm Naumann; 24 January 1907; Berlin, Germany
- Died: 27 February 1997 (aged 90); Dreieich, Hesse, Germany
- Occupations: Journalist; Publisher (crime fiction)
- Political party: KPD; SPD
- Spouse: Johanna Marie Dörrer
- Children: Ann Margaret Anders (1947-)
- Parent(s): Johannes Naumann (1880-1940); Emma Kutschenreiter/Naumann (1882-1960)

Karl Anders (real name Karl Kurt Wilhelm Anders-Naumann) (24 January 1907 – 27 February 1997) was a German political activist who was forced to emigrate during the Nazi period. After the war he became a print and broadcast journalist.

During the 1950s he became a publisher. Between 1953 and 1957 Karl Anders worked as the director of the publishing business of the Frankfurter Rundschau newspaper group. As a publisher he devoted much effort to promoting Anglo-American criminal fiction in Germany.

In the 1960s he returned to politics, although by now the youthful Communist had become a member of the moderate left-wing SPD (party).

== Life ==
After leaving his Berlin middle school Karl Anders (as he later became known) worked as a furniture upholsterer and undertook a traineeship as a Landscape gardener. He also attended evening classes in 1929–31 and which led the belated but successful completion of the School final exams with which, given a more academic focus and less political distraction during his teenage years, he would have concluded his secondary schooling. He joined the German Communist Party in 1929 and quickly assumed leadership roles within the party, becoming in the same year General Secretary of the "World Youth League". Between 1929 and 1931 he also served on the board of the Socialist Students' League. In 1931 her became Party Secretary for literature and propaganda in the Berlin-Brandenburg district. Two years later, in January 1933, the NSDAP (Nazi Party) took power and lost little time in establishing a one-party state in Germany. Anders nevertheless continued with his (now illegal) support for the Communist Party, becoming a Central Committee Instructor for Pressure and Propaganda. In June 1933 he was a victim of the Köpenick Blood letting week, and was held in the SA Wendenschloß detention centre where he was badly maltreated.

In March 1934 Anders fled to Prague where until 1936 he was the exiled German Communist Party's leader for Agitation and Propaganda work. From 1936 till 1937 he belonged to the Red Aid executive for Germany. In 1937 he became a member of the Salda Committee and the organisations's Secretary for Slovakia based in Bratislava. War broke out in 1939 and Anders emigrated first to Poland, where he married Marie Dörrer at Kraków in 1939, and then to Britain. In 1939 he was concealing his identity behind various cover names including "Karl Schreiber" and "Karl Schlegel". In 1940 the British identified him as an enemy alien and he was interned in June 1940, his detention continuing till the end of the year. It was from this time that he started to use the pseudonym "Karl Anders" in place of his birth name which had been Kurt Wilhelm Naumann. In London he joined the socialist New Beginning anti-Nazi opposition group and started working as a broadcaster with the Broadcaster of the European Revolution radio station which transmitted from London between 1940 and 1942, before being effectively subsumed into the more snappily named British Broadcasting Corporation (BBC). Between 1943 and 1945 Anders worked as chief editor for German language workers' broadcasts by the BBC. From 1943 he was also employed to give lectures to German prisoners of war held by the British.

After the war ended, formally in May 1945, Karl Anders continued to be employed by the BBC till 1949. In addition to his BBC work he also wrote for some British newspapers. He reported (in German) for the BBC Overseas Service on the Nuremberg trials and also, at this time, wrote his first book, "Im Nürnberger Irrgarten", which was a re-working of some of his broadcast reports. Unusually, he was able to have his book published by his own publishing company, at this stage a small-scale operation called "Nest-Verlag" which with three colleagues he had set up locally in Nuremberg in 1946. He relocated permanently to Germany in 1949: after his three co-founders disappeared from the business his publishing house, which in 1955 relocated to Frankfurt am Main, became the focus of his career. Although the Frankfurter Rundschau newspaper group took a 50% share in Neste-Verlag in 1955, Anders continued to run it single-handedly till 1960. By this time, however, in 1959 he had sold the residual 50% of it to the Frankfurter Rundschau. There followed a period of growing mutual acrimony and Anders resigned from his publishing company in 1961, returning the focus his evidently undimmed energies to politics.

"Neste Verlag" had started out as a publisher of political books, but in 1948 the background for publishing in Germany changed with a reduction in demand for political books, a change in the rules governing paper rationing and the West German currency reforms. Anders' BBC career had left him with good contacts in the world of British books and authors, and these he now matched with an idea that proved timely. "Neste Verlag" became a specialist publisher of German language translations of English-language crime novels. Its better remembered (at least among English language readers) writers included Margery Allingham, Raymond Chandler, Francis Durbridge, Erle Stanley Gardner, Michael Innes and Dorothy Sayers. The German translations of the anglophone crime novels appeared in a series called "Krähen Bücher", with print runs typically of 5,000 copies. However, the appetite for them faded in the 1960s and the Frankfurter Rundschau in turn sold the business on, after which it faded from the scene.

In 1961 Karl Anders accepted the invitation to join the national election team of the Social Democratic Party (SPD / Sozialdemokratische Partei Deutschlands). He also served, between 1971 and 1974, as a member of the party's "Core Values Commission" ("Grundwerte-Kommission"). He was an adviser to the IG Bau-Steine-Erden trades union, which led to the publication in 1969 of his history of the trades union under the title "Stein für Stein" ("Stone for stone"). He continued to write, also remaining active as a contributor to the party newspaper, Vorwärts.

== Death ==
Karl Anders died in 1997 at Dreieich, on the south side of Frankfurt am Main, and to the north of Darmstadt.

== Honour ==
- 1967: Order of Merit of the Federal Republic of Germany 1st class
