= Reek =

Reek may refer to:

== Places ==
- Reek, Netherlands, a village in the Dutch province of North Brabant
- Croagh Patrick, a mountain in the west of Ireland nicknamed "The Reek"

== People ==
- Nikolai Reek (1890–1942), Estonian military commander
- Salme Reek (1907–1996), Estonian actress
- Reek da Villian, American rapper
- Walter Reek (1878–1933), German politician

== Fictional characters ==
- Reek (fictional creature), a fictional creature in the Star Wars universe
- Reek, name given to Theon Greyjoy by Ramsay Bolton in A Song of Ice and Fire

== Other uses ==
- Reek, to emit an unpleasant odor
