= Hilde Meisel =

German socialist and journalist

- Born: 31 July 1914; Vienna, Austria-Hungary
- Died: 17 April 1945 (aged 30); Feldkirch, Alpine and Danube Reichsgaue
- Education: Economics
- Alma mater: London School of Economics
- Occupation: Journalist
- Spouse: John Olday
- Writing career
- Pen name: Hilde Olday; Selma Trier; Helen Harriman; Eva Schneider; H. Monte; Hilde Monte
- Notable works: How to Conquer Hitler: A Plan of Economic and Moral Warfare on the Nazi Home Front; Where Freedom Perished; Help Germany to Revolt!; The Unity of Europe

Hilde Meisel (31 July 1914 – 17 April 1945) was a Jewish German socialist and journalist who published articles against the Nazi regime in Germany. While in exile in England, she wrote under the pseudonym Hilda Monte, calling for German resistance to Nazism in magazines, books and in radio broadcasts. She acted as a courier and repeatedly undertook secret operations in Germany, Austria, France and Portugal, although as a social democrat and Jew, it was extremely dangerous for her to do so. Other code names she used in exile were Hilde Olday, Selma Trier, Helen Harriman, Eva Schneider, H. Monte, Hilda Monte and Hilde Monte.

== Early political influences ==
Meisel was born to Rosa and Ernst Meisel, the younger of two daughters in a middle-class, German Jewish family in Vienna. With hostilities breaking out that resulted in the start of World War I, the family moved back to Berlin in 1915. They had previously lived there and her older sister had been born there in 1912. Meisel's father exported and imported household goods for a living.

According to the Berlin address book, her parents lived in Berlin from 1915 until 1936. Meisel suffered with a physical problem until puberty, necessitating frequent trips with her mother to Switzerland. In 1924, Meisel and her sister, Margot joined a German-Jewish youth group with socialist revolutionary ideas, called the Schwarze Haufen, which was part of the liberal German-Jewish Wanderbund-Kameraden. Margot became friendly with the leader of the group, Max Fürst and Hans Litten, his childhood friend and the ideological head of the group. Margot later became Fürst's wife and Litten's secretary. After Litten's arrest by the Gestapo, as his secretary, she was able to maintain contact with him for a time; she worked tirelessly to secure his freedom.

Meisel attended the Berlin Lyceum from 1924 to 1929. She then went to England, where her uncle, the conductor and composer Edmund Meisel, was then living and working in London. That same year, she undertook in the local London group her first activities with the Internationaler Sozialistischer Kampfbund (ISK), a socialist group that split from the SPD during the Weimar Republic and was active in the fight against Nazism. In January 1931, Hilde Meisel went back to Germany. The ISK established its own press, Der Funke in 1932 and Meisel contributed a number of articles, writing about the economic problems in France, England and Spain.

== Nazi era begins ==
In 1933, the Nazis seized power, suppressing Der Funke shortly afterwards, and Meisel began getting active with the German Resistance, briefly moving to Cologne to help smuggle individuals associated with the labour movement and money out of Germany and into safety in the Netherlands, Belgium and Switzerland, as well as smuggling banned literature into the country. She then returned to Berlin, where she established underground socialist propaganda networks and organised efforts to oppose the 1934 referendum on elevating Hitler from Chancellor to Fuhrer. Toward the end of 1934 she emigrated to Paris, where she was needed for the editorial work at the ISK headquarters established there. She also began publishing numerous articles on politics and economics.

Meisel became active with the ISK established friendships with political contacts in different countries. She lived in Paris for a time, from where she made regular trips back to Germany to aid underground trade union groups, before relocating back to the UK in 1936. Writing under the pseudonym "Hilda Monte", she brought like-minded comrades in Germany information. She also acted as a courier and smuggled literature into Germany and helped those under threat by the Gestapo to escape from Germany. The last time that Hilda Monte returned from Germany (in the direction of Belgium) was on September 3, 1939. Meisel also wrote for, and served as a member of the editorial board of, Sozialistische Warte, an exile publication of the ISK, writing primarily about problems with the economy.

As the situation with Litten deteriorated when he went to Dachau concentration camp in October 1937, Meisel began to work intensively to secure his release. She corresponded with other supporters and arranged to publish an article in the Manchester Guardian on 26 January 1938, "In Dachau Camp. The Tragic Case of Hans Litten". These efforts were without success; Litten committed suicide just days later on 5 February 1938.

To avoid being deported, Meisel entered into a marriage of convenience with the British-German caricaturist and cartoonist John Olday in 1938. In so doing, she became a "British subject by marriage", allowing her to carry out her work in England more easily and Meisel developed a busy career as a journalist, writing articles for The Vanguard, Sozialistische Warte, Left News and Tribune. In addition she was a lecturer for the Workers' Educational Association. During this period she lived in Sleights in the North Riding of Yorkshire with Austrian artist Hannes Hammerschmidt and his wife Tess. Also at this time, she approached George Strauss, left-wing Labour MP and one of the financiers and founders of Tribune, for money to fund an assassination attempt on Hitler: according to him, he arranged for her to meet financial journalist Werner Knop, who agreed to provide support, although the attack did not materialise.

== How to conquer Hitler ==
In March 1942, Hilda Monte and Hellmut von Rauschenpalt (= Fritz Eberhard) published How to Conquer Hitler – A Plan of Economic and Moral Warfare of the Nazi Home Front. Monte specifically signed Chapter 10, which deals with educational issues. In the 1970s, Rauschenplat mentioned his association with Monte in exile in England.

The outbreak of the war was a turning point in my work in exile. I separated myself from the organization, from the ISK at that point. After that, I was not political, but rather worked with unions; so then, in England, I was a political loner. My admission ticket, to speak, to a more tolerable and fertile life in exile, was a book which I had written with Hilde Monte very soon after the war began because of previously ongoing preparations. She left Germany just one day before the outbreak of war, but had previously been in England. She had recently experienced the psychological situation of the population in Germany. This book, How to Conquer Hitler, gave advice on the economic and psychological war against Hitler. This book had magnificent reviews; the book is a rarity, since most of the edition happened to be in a warehouse at the port when it was destroyed by Nazi bombs. Even if, as a result, the book never became very widespread, some important people did know of it, and so many doors opened for me.

== Leaves the ISK ==
In April 1939, Monte leaves the ISK due to differences with Willi Eichler regarding her work assignments. Hellmut von Rauschenplat followed later that year for his own personal reasons.

== Sender der europäischen Revolution ==
In early 1940, Meisel and Eberhard were appointed to be advisors with the Gillies Committee, under the direction of William Gillies. They were to develop concrete plans to set up a "black propaganda" radio station. Called the Sender der europäischen Revolution ("European Revolution Broadcasting Station"), it first went on the air 7 October 1940.

After the Gillies Committee was dissolved in 1941, she continued working till 1943 with the trade unionist Walter Auerbach, the lawyer Otto Kahn-Freund and Eberhard to form a discussion group that would work in the fight against National Socialism in Germany.

On assignment by the Minister of Economic Warfare, Hilde Meisel worked with the Central European Joint Committee, which was set up by émigrés to Great Britain to create propaganda and to analyze news and information coming from Germany.

The Ministry of Economic Warfare also contained the Special Operations Executive, which was responsible for secret operations in Europe. Meisel's experience and skills from her underground work led to her being dispatched to Lisbon for a period in 1941, where she acted as a courier of international telegrams using the codes of both SOE and Auerbach's International Transport Workers' Federation.

== Help Germany to Revolt! ==
The booklet, Help Germany to Revolt! was published in 1942. It is the last book she wrote with Fritz Eberhard. About this project, Eberhard wrote, "On behalf of the Fabian Society, I wrote a small booklet with Hilda Monte, Help Germany to Revolt. It was written as a letter to the members of the Labour Party and proceeded from the idea that not all Germans were Nazis."

== German Educational Reconstruction ==
In 1942, Meisel worked with Fritz Borinski, Werner Milch (germanist), Minna Specht, Walter Auerbach, Werner Burmeister, Fritz Eberhard and Otto Kahn-Freund to establish the German Educational Reconstruction Committee, a project of the "Union of German Socialist Organisations in Great Britain" launched to plan and prepare a reorganization of the system of education and upbringing in postwar Germany.

Founded in spring 1941 at the request of the British Labour Party, the Union was a consortium of German Socialist refugees from several German political parties, Sopade, the Socialist Workers' Party of Germany, Neu Beginnen and the ISK. They set themselves to work on the downfall of the Hitlerian system and to work with the Allies to defeat Hitler. They also discussed the conditions and work of a future united socialist party in Germany, exchanging ideas on a common objective so as not to repeat the mistakes of the Weimar Republic in a democratic, postwar Germany.

== BBC ==
Meisel also appeared on the broadcasts of the British Broadcasting Corporation (BBC) geared toward German workers, worked with the education program of the British forces, and toward the end of the war, got involved again with the ISK group in London.

One surviving radio manuscript, written in mid-December 1942, deals with the murder of European Jews.

What is happening today in Poland, the cold-blooded extermination of the Jewish people, this is being done in your name, in the name of the German people. [...] Show evidence of your solidarity to these people, even if it requires courage - especially if it requires courage.

== The Unity of Europe ==
Originally, Meisel worked on the book, The Next Germany. A Basis of Discussion on Peace in Europe with Walter Auerbach, Fritz Eberhard, Otto Kahn-Freund and Kurt Mandelbaum, but left the project because of differences of opinion.

Her ideas and comprehensive approaches to the economic integration of Europe were then published in her own book, "The Unity of Europe". Among other topics, it covered the economic requirements of a postwar Europe. Many German university students have written their diplom theses using this book.

Both books were published in 1943. The "Sozialistische Mitteilungen: News for German Socialists in England" wrote,

In a short chapter of her new book, The Unity of Europe (published by the Left Book Club), Hilda Monte debates the status of Germany in a new Europe; in principle, in the same sense as The Next Germany, published around the same time. Monte's highly readable book is rich in factual material and instructive discussion of the political and economic problems in Europe's future. It stresses, in particular, the recent opposition of the highly industrialized West and agrarian southeastern Europe; the export difficulties on the one hand, rural poverty on the other, crises, tensions and which involved uncertainty and was one of the causes of the war.

== Secret mission to Switzerland ==
In summer 1944, Meisel was recruited for the "Faust Project" of the Office of Strategic Services (OSS), who were looking for some 200 agents to obtain military and political news from Germany. The OSS held several training programs for the participants in a small private house outside London. The teachers were members of the U.S. Army, including several immigrants. The participants were briefed on practical aspects of everyday life in Nazi Germany, such as ration cards, how to acquire an apartment and other bureaucratic requirements they'd need to navigate in order to find work. At the end of the course, they were trained in parachuting. Because the pending trips were secret, they were forbidden to talk to their friends about their plans.

In September 1944, Meisel and Anna Beyer flew to France. The original plan was for them to be dropped near Lyon, but there were skirmishes in the area, so they were landed by light aircraft in Thonon-les-Bains, near Lake Geneva, in a meadow used as a landing field by the British Special Operations Executive.

They were transported by French farmers in an old open wagon to an unused tunnel, where they were met by an English officer. He helped them reach Thonon-les-Bains, where they stayed four weeks, until they were picked up by Rene Bertholet. Surreptitiously, they crossed the border into Switzerland and went to Zurich, where they were given new identification documents. However, the notion that Hilda Monte had participated in the meetings of european federalist resistance fighters held in May and June at Willem Adolf Visser 't Hooft's home in Geneva has now been disproved. According to sources, she was undergoing training in Great Britain at that time. In all likelihood, this was a misremembering of Altiero Spinelli, the organizer of those meetings, which was subsequently repeated by historians.

René Bertholet brought Hilda Monte and Anna Beyer to the Ticino Alps near Intragna, Switzerland. In the Centovalli valley, the Bertholets maintained a couple of old farmhouses, named "Al Forno", which were used to hide a number of militants waiting to be infiltrated into Germany. Another part of the waiting period was spent in Zurich.

Near the end of the war, Meisel, Beyer, Hanna Bertholet and Änne Kappius received an invitation from the American headquarters in Bern to discuss returning to Germany to engage in acts of sabotage, but they declined. A little later, Meisel made contact with German: Karl Gerold, who later became editor of the Frankfurter Rundschau, to establish links with Austrian resistance groups from Ticino.

On 17 April 1945, while trying to cross the border illegally from German-occupied Austria into Liechtenstein, Monte was shot when she made a dash for the frontier at Tisis near Feldkirch. Shot in the thigh, she bled to death while still on the border. According to Nora Platiel’s account from July 1945, Hilda Monte was fully aware of the risks she was taking: “Why on earth should I spare myself?” she reportedly asked during a conversation a few weeks earlier.

== Legacy ==
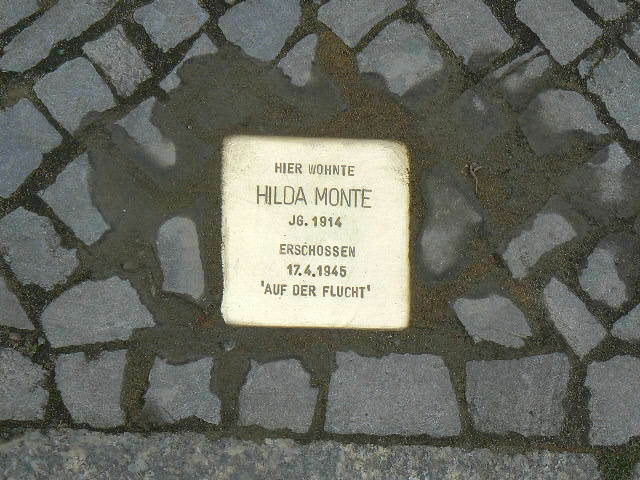
Stolperstein in Berlin-Wilmersdorf for Hilda Monte, Landhausstrasse 3.

There are two streets named after Hilda Monte: Hilda-Monte-Straße in Bergkamen and Hilda-Monte-Weg in the Bergedorf quarter of Hamburg. There is a memorial dedicated to Monte in Feldkirch and a Stolperstein for her in Berlin (see photo, above). There is a permanent display about Hilda Monte at the Jewish Museum in Hohenems, Austria, not far from where she was killed in action.

After 1945, there was a certain amount of speculation surrounding Hilda Monte. In particular, the alleged connection to the Bürgerbräu assassination attempt in November 1939 has been unequivocally disproved by historical evidence by 1969 at the latest.

In 2026, Ugo Giuliani published The Europeanist, a historical novel inspired by the life of Hilde Meisel, also known as Hilda Monte.

== Meisel's literary work ==
=== Books and brochures ===
As Hilde Meisel:

- Gedichte Hans Lehnert - Europäische Verlagsanstalt, Hamburg (1950)

As Hilda Monte:

- How to conquer Hitler, with Hellmut von Rauschenplat - Jarrolds, London (1940)
- Help Germany to revolt!, with Helmut von Rauschenplat - Victor Gollancz Ltd and the Fabian Society, London (1942)
- The Unity of Europe, with introduction by Henry Noel Brailsford - Victor Gollancz Ltd, London (1943)
- Where freedom perished, foreword by Jennie Lee - Victor Gollancz Ltd, London (1947)

=== Articles in the Sozialistische Warte ===
(Pen name used is given in brackets)

- [Selma Trier] Der Griff nach der Saar, Vol. 9, 1934, No. 8 (December), pp. 192–201
- [H. Monte] Krise und Ausbeutung, Vol. 11, 1936, No. 1 (January), pp. 13–16
- [H. Monte] Neues Labour-Programm, Vol. 12, 1937, No. 10 (15 May 1937), pp. 220–222
- [H. Monte] Evolutionärer Kommunismus, Vol. 13, 1938, No. 12 (25 March 1938), pp. 267–270
- [Hilde Monte] Die wirtschaftliche Unabhängigkeit der CSR, Vol. 13, 1938, No. 26 (1 July 1938), pp. 603–609
- [Hilde Monte] Ungarn vor der Wahl, Vol. 13, 1938, No. 28 (15 July 1938), pp. 658–662
- [Hilde Monte] Die Erschliessung Polens, Vol. 13, 1938, No. 36 (9 September 1938), pp. 845–848

== See also ==
- List of Germans who resisted Nazism
- Soldatensender Calais
