= Hans Vogel =

German politician (1881–1945)

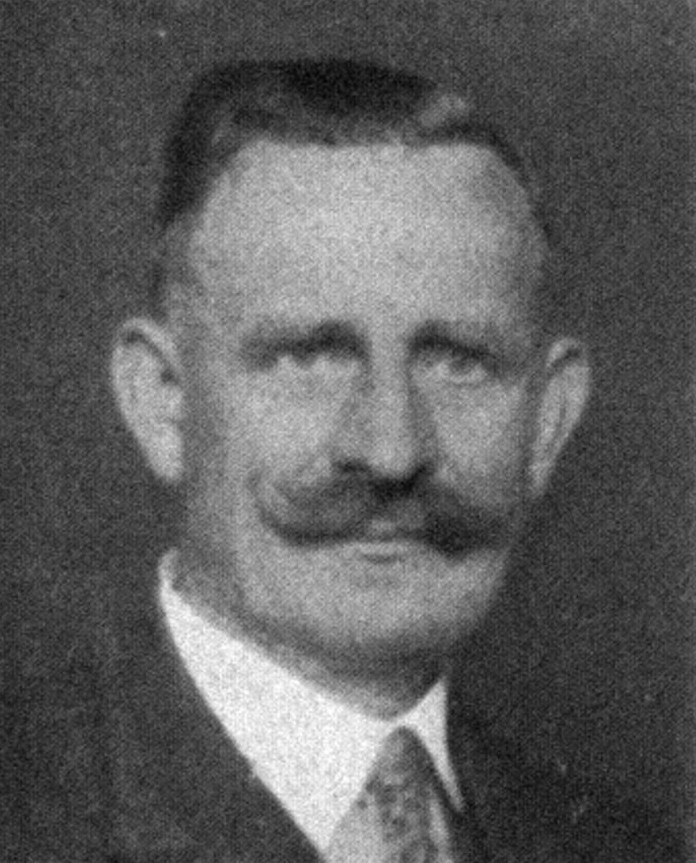
- Vogel c. 1930

Chairman of the Social Democratic Party of Germany
- In office 20 March 1931 – 6 October 1945
- Serving with: Otto Wels (1931–1939); Arthur Crispien (1931–1933)
- Preceded by: Hermann Müller
- Succeeded by: Kurt Schumacher (British zone); Otto Grotewohl (Soviet zone)

Member of the Reichstag for Franconia
- In office 24 June 1920 – 22 June 1933
- Preceded by: Constituency established

Member of the National Assembly for Franconia
- In office 6 February 1919 – 21 May 1920
- Preceded by: Office established
- Succeeded by: Office abolished

Personal details
- Born: Johann Vogel; 16 February 1881 Oberartelshofen, Bavaria, German Empire
- Died: 6 October 1945 (aged 64) London, England, UK
- Party: SPD
- Occupation: Politician
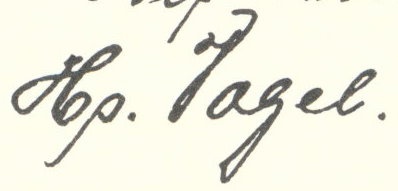
- Signature

Johann (Hans) Vogel (16 February 1881 – 6 October 1945) was a German politician and chairman of the Social Democratic Party of Germany (SPD) along with Arthur Crispien and Otto Wels from 1931 to 1933. After the NSDAP came to power in 1933, he became one of the leaders of the social democratic exile organization Sopade.

== Biography ==
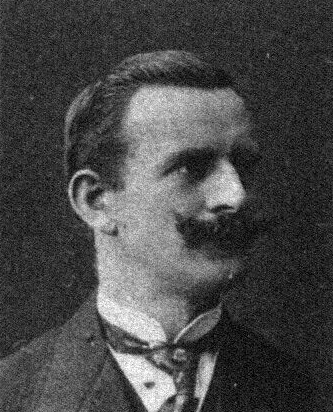
Vogel's official National Assembly portrait, 1919

After attending the Volkshochschule in Fürth, Vogel, the son of a merchant and shoemaker, completed an apprenticeship as a wood sculptor assistant in 1897. He joined the trade union for wood sculptors as early as 1897 and worked in various parts of Germany. He was board member of a Social Democratic electoral association in Fürth from 1907 to 1911. From 1908, Vogel worked as secretary of the party in the region of Franconia. From 1912 to 1918, he was a member of the Chamber of Deputies in the Bavarian Landtag. He supported the Burgfrieden politics of his party, i.e. support for the German war effort and giving up the anti-militarist stance at the beginning of World War I, because he viewed this as his patriotic duty. He served in World War I as a radio operator in the 105th Division.

After the war and the German Revolution, Vogel was a member of the German National Assembly, which composed the Weimar Constitution. He remained a member of the Reichstag until June 1933 from electoral constituency 26 (Franconia). After becoming a member of the caucus of the SPD in 1920, he was elected secretary of the party in 1927. In 1931, he became chairman along with Arthur Crispien and Otto Wels.

Vogel first went to Saarbrücken in early May, because it was administered by the League of Nations at that time, and then on 2 June he moved on to Prague. In 1938, he moved to Paris and there he helped build up the Sopade, of which he was the sole chairman after Wels's death in 1939. In 1939, he fled to London and became the chairman of the Union of German Socialist Organisations in Great Britain.

His death in October 1945 meant that he was not able to help with re-building the post-war SPD. Hans-Vogel-Straße, a street in Fürth, is named after him.

== See also ==
- Union of German Socialist Organisations in Great Britain
