= Richard Löwenthal =

German journalist and professor (1908–1991)

- Born: April 15, 1908; Berlin, German Empire
- Died: August 9, 1991 (aged 83); Berlin, Germany
- Occupation: Political scientist
- Known for: Arguing for a post-totalitarianism interpretation of Soviet politics

Richard Löwenthal (April 15, 1908 – August 9, 1991) was a German journalist and professor who wrote mostly on the problems of democracy, communism, and world politics.

== Life ==
Löwenthal was born in Berlin, Germany, the son of Ernst and Anna Löwenthal. His father was a real estate agent. From 1926 until 1931, Löwenthal studied political science, economics, and sociology at Berlin University and Heidelberg University. His major intellectual influences were Max Weber and Karl Mannheim. From 1926 until 1929, Löwenthal was a member of the Communist Party of Germany, which he left over opposition to the tactics of the Comintern. Remaining on the Left, Löwenthal was a member of several dissident breakaway groups from the KPD in the last years of the Weimar Republic.

In 1933 Löwenthal was a prominent Jewish member of the anti-Nazi group Neu Beginnen (New Beginnings / "[to] begin anew") which sought to organize the German working class to overthrow the Nazi regime. During this period, Löwenthal adopted the alias Paul Sering. In July 1933 the New Beginnings group broke up under the impact of a huge wave of Gestapo arrests of its members. As a wanted man, Löwenthal continued to work for an anti-Nazi working-class revolution until increasing pressure from the Gestapo led Löwenthal to flee to the United Kingdom in August 1935. Subsequently Löwenthal moved to Prague, Czechoslovakia where he remained active in left-wing German émigré groups. From April 1936 until October 1937, Löwenthal worked as a researcher in London before returning to Prague. Following the Munich Agreement of 1938, Löwenthal fled to Paris, France and then in 1939 returned to London, which was to be Löwenthal’s home until 1959. During the 1930s, in his writings Löwenthal expressed strong criticism of the definition of fascism proposed by the Comintern, and in particular criticized the Comintern’s social fascism theory which held that moderate left-wing groups such as the Social Democratic Party of Germany and Labour Party were as much fascist as were the Nazi Party, and if anything were more dangerous because of their “disguised” fascist nature, in contrast to the “open fascism” of the Nazis. Starting in 1935 Löwenthal began formulating his own definition of fascism, which was strongly influenced by the work of Otto Bauer and Franz Leopold Neumann. In these writings, Löwenthal concluded that Nazi Germany was not a puppet of Big Business as the Comintern had claimed and that, in fact, the Nazi regime was in and of itself the supreme power in the land. During the late 1930s, Löwenthal decided that another world war was inevitable, and saw his main task as preparing the German left for that war.

During his time in the United Kingdom, Löwenthal was close to the Fabian Society, and helped publish The International Socialist Forum. From 1940 until 1942 Löwenthal worked for the BBC’s German language program, Sender der europäischen Revolution. In 1941, Löwenthal published a book which argued that it was necessary for the Soviet Union to be given the lion’s share of the responsibility of governing Germany after the war, as this would be the best means of ensuring the triumph of the German Left. After 1943, Löwenthal disavowed this position and instead urged that the main responsibility of re-building Germany after the war be given to the Western powers, who were, in Löwenthal’s opinion, the powers most likely to ensure a democratic Germany. Löwenthal very much admired the Labour Party and in several articles after 1945, urged that West Germany adopted the British model for its economic organization. In 1945, Löwenthal joined the Social Democratic Party of Germany. In his 1948 book, Jenseits des Kapitalismus, Löwenthal called for a Socialist reconstruction of the European system with an especially prominent role to be allocated to Great Britain as the most progressive of the European powers. An Anglophile, Löwenthal was much influenced by his time in Britain. Löwenthal was late to write that “In England the German socialist emigrants got to know an impressive model of a free democracy which proved its worth under extreme external pressure; thus they were essentially confirmed in their democratic conviction and prepared for the task that awaited them after the war. The English, at least those who lent the emigrant an ear and cooperated with them, gathered new hope that a true democracy might be established in Germany and contributed considerably to the realization of this model during the first harsh postwar years. After a lapse of several decades, I can thus state with conviction that in spite of all the initial difficulties, the encounter proved rewarding to both sides”.

Until 1958, Löwenthal worked as a reporter for Reuters press agency and The Observer newspaper. In 1959 Löwenthal became a professor in political science at the Free University of Berlin. In 1974 Löwenthal became the Professor Emeritus at the Free University. Löwenthal ’s chief interests were Communism and Eastern Europe. In 1960, Löwenthal married the sociologist Charlotte Abrahamsohn. Löwenthal was a strong advocate of closer European integration and of an Atlanticist orientation. In the late 1960s, Löwenthal was initially sympathetic towards student protestors, but turned against what he regarded as the destructive anarchism and “romantic relapse” into Marxism of the New Left and rejected their call for a West German pull-out from NATO as opening the door for the Soviet conquest of Western Europe.

In work on the Soviet Union, Löwenthal's major interests were the emergence of what he considered to an element of pluralism into Soviet politics, especially during the rule of Nikita Khrushchev. Unlike other totalitarianism theories such as Juan Linz and Karl Dietrich Bracher, whose work was chiefly inspired by studying Nazi Germany Löwenthal based his studies largely upon developments in the Soviet Union and East Bloc. One of Löwenthal’s more notable ideas was that under the rule of Joseph Stalin, the Soviet Union had been a totalitarian state, but what emerged after Stalin’s death was a system Löwenthal called variously “post-totalitarian authoritarianism” or "authoritarian bureaucratic oligarchy" in which the Soviet state remained omnipotent in theory and highly authoritarian in practice, but did scale down considerably the scale of repression and allow much greater level of pluralism into public life. In regards to foreign policy, Löwenthal argued that after Stalin, and even more so, after the overthrow of Khruschchev, the ideological commitments that underlined Soviet foreign policy were considerably weakened. Despite this, Löwenthal maintained that Soviet foreign policy remained basically antagonistic towards the West, and that the Cold War would continue as long as the Soviet Union was an anti-democratic state. In the mid-1960s, Löwenthal was highly critical of the policy of United States, or lack thereof, as Löwenthal asserted that the administration of President Lyndon B. Johnson had no policy of rallying together the states of Western Europe to resist Soviet encroachments, and was instead content to let matters drift. At the same time, Löwenthal was opposed to the French President Charles de Gaulle's anti-American policies, which Löwenthal felt were folly in light of the threat from the East.

In Löwenthal's opinion, the ending of the "revolution from above" also marked the end of totalitarianism in the Soviet Union. Likewise, Löwenthal maintained that in the "post-totalitarian" system meant that henceforward the powers of Communist Party leaders over their Central Committees and Politburos were no greater than the powers of a Western Prime Minister over their Cabinets. Löwenthal argued "Those countries have not gone from tyranny to freedom, but from massive terror to a rule of meanness, ensuring stability at the risk of stagnation". Moreover, Löwenthal argued that the essence of Communist totalitarianism was an utopian faith. Löwenthal contended that Communist utopianism was doomed to failure "as it conflicted with, and eventually succumbed to, the necessity for economic modernization". Without utopianism, Löwenthal argued that "revolutions from above" were excluded as a policy option. In a 1960 article in Commentary, Löwenthal claimed that totalitarianism was a dead force in the East Bloc, even through none of the regimes were anything close to being "liberalized". Moreover, Löwenthal asserted it was impossible for the East Bloc regimes to return to totalitarianism, arguing that "that particular secular religion is dead-at least in those countries that have tried it out". Besides for writing on contemporary issues, in the 1980s, Löwenthal played a major role in the push for a Holocaust museum in Berlin, which as a German Jew was a cause that was of major interest to him.

In addition to his work in Soviet studies, Löwenthal was noted for his defense of the Federal Republic. Löwenthal felt that the Federal Republic was the most democratic government in German history, and criticized the left-wing philosopher Jürgen Habermas for utopianism when the latter asserted in the 1970s that the Federal Republic was not democratic enough.

During the Historikerstreit of the 1980s, Löwenthal argued for the "fundamental difference" in mass murder in Germany and the Soviet Union, and against the "balancing" of various crimes in the 20th century as he accused Ernst Nolte of doing Löwenthal contended that comparisons between Hitler and Stalin were appropriate, but comparisons between Hitler and Lenin were not For Löwenthal, the decisive factor that governed Lenin’s conduct was that right from the onset when he took power, he was involved in civil wars within Russia Löwenthal argued that “Lenin’s battle to hold on to power” did not comprise “one-sided mass annihilation of defenceless people” Speaking of the Russian Civil War, Löwenthal argued that “In all these battles there were heavy losses on both sides and horrible torture and murders of prisoners” Speaking of the differences between Lenin and Stalin, Löwenthal argued that “What Stalin did from 1929 on was something entirely different” Löwenthal argued that with dekulakization, the so-called “kulaks” were to be destroyed by the Soviet state as:

“...a hindrance to forced collectivization. They were not organized. They had not fought. They were shipped to far-away concentration camps and in general were not killed right away, but were forced to suffer conditions that led in the course of time to a miserable death”

Löwenthal argued that:

“What Stalin did from 1929 both against peasants and against various other victims, including leading Communists (among them, incidentally, Bucharin, who in 1929 had already publicly taken a position against the “new system”) and returned soldiers, was in fact historically new in its systematic inhumanity, and to this extent comparable with the deeds of Hitler. Certainly, Hitler, like all his contemporaries, had a preconception of the civil wars of Lenin’s time. Just as certainly his own ideas about the total annihilation of the Jews, the Gypsies, the “unworthy of life”, and so on, were independent of Stalin’s example. At any rate the idea of total annihilation of the Jews had already been developed in the last work of Hitler’s mentor, Dietrich Eckart, who died in 1924. For the reference to this source, which leaves no room for “balancing”, I am grateful to Ernst Nolte’s first large book, which appeared in 1963, Faschismus in seiner Epoche [Fascism in Its Epoch]

A major intellectual in the SPD, Löwenthal was often consulted by the SPD’s leaders, especially Willy Brandt and Ernst Reuter. He died, aged 83, in Berlin.

== Work ==
- Co-written with Willy Brandt: Ernst Reuter, ein Leben für die Freiheit; eine politische Biographie, München: Kindler, 1957.
- “Diplomacy and Revolution: The Dialectics of a Dispute”, pages 1–24 from The China Quarterly, Issue # 5 January- March 1961.
- “Factors of Unity and Factors of Conflict”, pages 106-116 from Annals of the American Academy of Political and Social Science, Volume 349, September 1963.
- World Communism: the Disintegration of a Secular Faith, New York: Oxford University Press, 1964.
- “The Soviets and the West: A European View”, pages 83–91 from Proceedings of the Academy of Political Science, Volume 28, Issue 1, April 1965.
- (Editor) Issues in the Future of Asia: Communist and Non-Communist Alternatives, New York: Praeger, 1969.
- Romantischer Rückfall, Stuttgart, Kohlhammer Verlag 1970.
- Die zweite Republik. 25 Jahre Bundesrepublik Deutschland: eine Bilanz, Stuttgart: Seewald Verlag 1974.
- Vom Kalten Krieg zur Ostpolitik, Stuttgart: Seewald, 1974 ISBN 3-512-00364-8.
- Model or Ally? The Communist Powers and the Developing Countries, New York: Oxford University Press, 1977 ISBN 0-19-502105-3.
- (Editor) End and beginning on the Generations of cultures and the Origins of the West by Franz Borkenau, New York: Columbia University Press, 1981, 0231050666.
- Widerstand und Verweigerung in Deutschland 1933 bis 1945, Berlin: Dietz, 1984 ISBN 3-8012-3008-2.
- Social Change and Cultural Crisis, New York: Columbia University Press, 1984 ISBN 0-231-05644-3.

== See also ==
- Union of German Socialist Organisations in Great Britain
