= Arthur Crispien =

German politician (1875–1946)

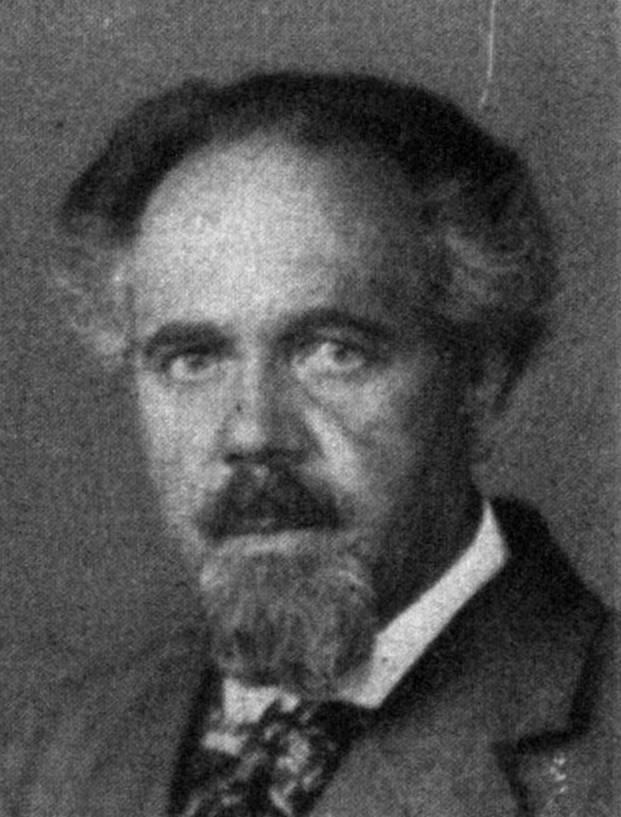
- Crispien c. 1930

Chairman of the Social Democratic Party of Germany
- In office 24 September 1922 – June 1933
- Serving with: Otto Wels (1922–1933); Hermann Müller (1922–1931); Hans Vogel (1931–1933)

Chairman of the Independent Social Democratic Party of Germany
- In office March 1919 – 24 September 1922
- Serving with: Hugo Haase (1919); Ernst Däumig (1919–1920); Georg Ledebour (1920–1922); Wilhelm Dittmann (1922)
- Preceded by: Georg Ledebour
- Succeeded by: Position abolished

Deputy Prime Minister of the Free People's State of Württemberg
- In office 11 November 1918 – 10 January 1919

Minister of the Interior of the Free People's State of Württemberg
- In office 11 November 1918 – 10 January 1919

Member of the Reichstag for Berlin
- In office 24 June 1920 – 22 June 1933
- Preceded by: Constituency established
- Succeeded by: Constituency abolished

Personal details
- Born: 4 November 1875 Königsberg, East Prussia, Kingdom of Prussia, German Empire
- Died: 29 November 1946 (aged 71) Bern, Switzerland
- Party: SPD (1894–1917, 1922–1933); USPD (1917–1922)
- Other political affiliations: Swiss Socialist Party
- Spouse: Berta Ranglack
- Children: 3
- Occupation: Painter, journalist

Arthur Crispien (4 November 1875 – 29 November 1946) was a German Social Democratic politician.

He was co-chairman and member of the Reichstag for the Independent Social Democratic Party of Germany, USPD, from 1920 - 1922. He was co-chairman and member of the Reichstag for the Social Democratic Party of Germany, SPD, from 1922 to 1933.

== Biography ==
Crispien was born in Königsberg (modern Kaliningrad, Russia) to August and Franziska Crispien. He worked as a house and stage painter in Königsberg and joined the Social Democratic Party of Germany (SPD) in 1894. He worked for a Health insurance fund and became the editor of the Königsberger Volkszeitung (1904–1906), the Danzig Volkswacht (1906–1912) and the Schwäbische Tagwacht in Stuttgart (1912–1914). In 1906 to 1912 Crispien was the regional Chairman of the SPD in West Prussia.

In 1909 he was sent to the SPD party school in Berlin where he became one of Rosa Luxemburg's students. They developed a close friendship that lasted until her death in 1919. He was sent in 1912 to Stuttgart to become editor-in-chief of the party paper Schwäbischen Tagwacht. He became part of the innermost circle of the SPD's left wing, which was then called the Gruppe Internationale, the International Group, but which later became the Spartacus League, and which was led by Rosa Luxemburg, Karl Liebknecht and Clara Zetkin. During that period he was seen as Spartacus' representative in Stuttgart.

At the outbreak of World War I he opposed the Burgfriedenspolitik of the SPD on voting for German war credits and was dismissed from the Schwäbische Tagwacht. Karl Liebknecht was the only MP from the SPD to vote against the party line. Crispien openly showed his support for him and was dismissed as editor-in-chief of the Schwäbische Tageswacht and came into conflict with Friedrich Ebert who later became the first president of the Weimar Republic. He illegally published the newspaper Der Sozialdemokrat (The Social Democrat) and was imprisoned for some months. He was conscripted in the German Army in 1916. He was sent to the Western Front but managed to desert.

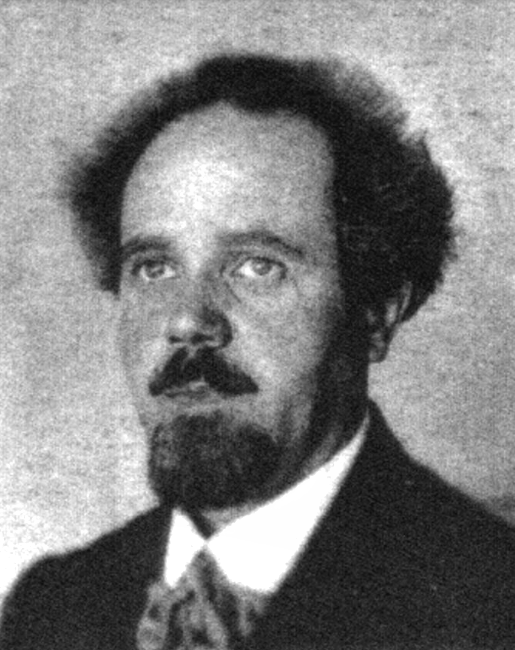
Crispien's official Reichstag portrait, 1920

In 1917, the SPD split and the USPD, the Independent Social Democratic Party of Germany, was formed by people from the left wing of the SPD. The remaining SPD took during this time the party designation MSPD, the Majority Social Democratic Party of Germany. Despite his closeness to above all Rosa Luxemburg, he began to take steps away from the Spartacists. In November 1918, Wilhelm II, the last German emperor abdicated and revolution broke out in the streets. When the Communist Party of Germany, KPD, was formed in December 1918 by Luxemburg and Liebknecht, Crispien remained in the USPD bloc. After the revolution, Crispien became a member of the Provisional Württemberg Government as Vice-President in 1918 and was Minister of the Interior in the Provisional State Government under Wilhelm Blos until 10 January 1919. After an attempted coup by the Spartacists, which was approved by the USPD, he was dismissed from the government. On 12 January 1919 he was elected to the Württemberg state parliament, but resigned in April 1919 after being elected party co-chairman and member of the Executive Committee of the USPD together with Hugo Haase in early March. The Weimar era saw him elected a Member of the Reichstag in 1920 and as Foreign Policy Spokesman for the USPD. He successfully co-led the USPD in the 1920 parliamentary election when the party received 18% of the vote and became the second largest party.

In 1920, he led a delegation of the USPD to the 2nd World Congress of the Communist International but refused to accept Lenin's conditions for participation in the Comintern. He was critical to the idea of a merger of the USPD with the KPD. Crispien now became a target for the German Communists and the Communist International who portrayed the USPD as "social fascist". From 1921 Crispien was a member of the executive board of the International Working Union of Socialist Parties.

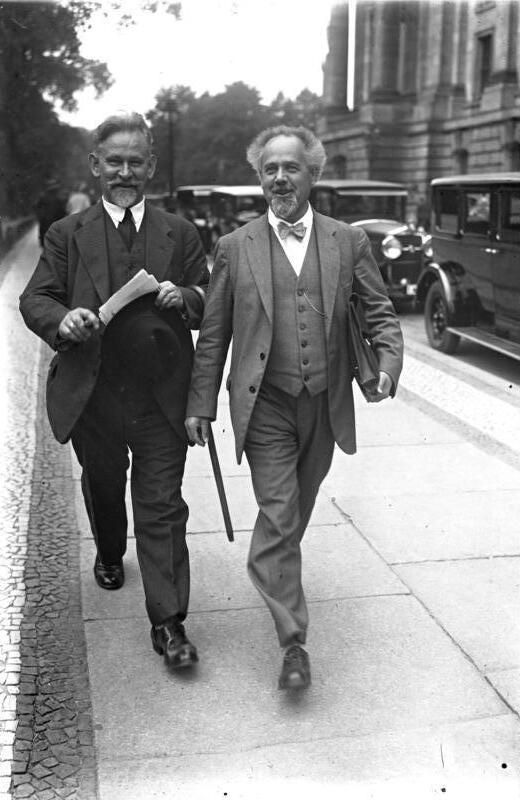
Crispien (right) and fellow Social Democrat Wilhelm Dittmann (left) leaving the Reichstag after its dissolution, 1930

In 1922, the USPD and MSPD were reunited and the SPD was re-formed. Crispien was a Member of Reichstag for the SPD from 1922 and co-led the party from 1922 to 1933. From 1923 he was a delegate to the Labour and Socialist International.

On 30 January 1933 the Nazi seizure of power commenced, when President Paul von Hindenburg appointed Hitler as Chancellor, who immediately urged the dissolution of the Reichstag and the calling of new elections. Crispien was the SPD's main candidate in the elections to the Reichstag on 5 March 1933, which was held six days after the Reichstag fire. Before the election, Nazi stormtroopers unleashed an extensive campaign of violence against members of the Communist Party, trade unions and the SPD. As party leader of the SPD and former war opponent and member of Spartacus League, there were rumors after the election that Crispien was high on SA's list and that they wanted to arrest him and hang him at the Brandenburg Gate.

Crispien managed to flee the country and went into exile to Austria and later Switzerland, representing the Social Democratic Party in Exile. Crispien supported political and Jewish refugees from Nazi Germany and became a member of the Swiss Socialist Party. He was a delegate at the refugee conference of 1945 at Montreux.

Crispien died in Bern, Switzerland, on 29 November 1946, aged 71.
