= Kurt Schumacher =

German politician (1895–1952)

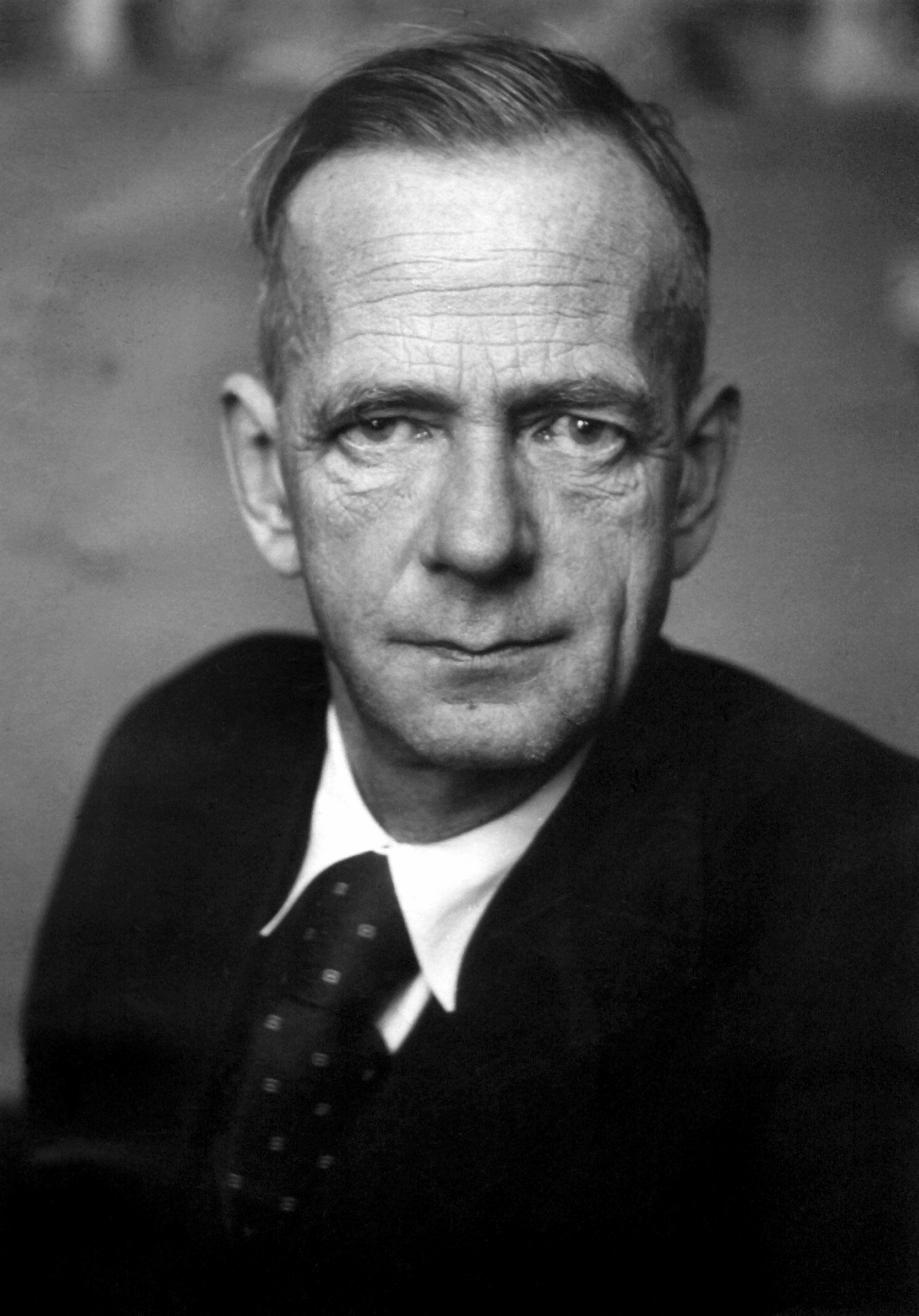
- Schumacher c. 1945–1948

Leader of the Opposition
- In office 7 September 1949 – 20 August 1952
- Chancellor: Konrad Adenauer
- Preceded by: Office established
- Succeeded by: Erich Ollenhauer

Leader of the Social Democratic Party
- In office 10 May 1946 – 20 August 1952
- Deputy: Erich Ollenhauer; Wilhelm Knothe
- Preceded by: Hans Vogel
- Succeeded by: Erich Ollenhauer

Leader of the Social Democratic Party in the Bundestag
- In office 7 September 1949 – 20 August 1952
- Deputy: Erich Ollenhauer; Carlo Schmid
- Preceded by: Office established
- Succeeded by: Erich Ollenhauer

Member of the Bundestag; for Stadt Hannover-Süd
- In office 7 September 1949 – 20 August 1952
- Preceded by: Constituency established
- Succeeded by: Ernst Winter

Member of the Reichstag; for Württemberg
- In office 13 October 1930 – 22 June 1933
- Preceded by: Multi-member district
- Succeeded by: Constituency abolished

Member of the Landtag of Württemberg; for Stuttgart
- In office 4 May 1924 – 26 January 1931
- Preceded by: Multi-member district
- Succeeded by: Erhard Schneckenburger

Personal details
- Born: Curt Ernst Carl Schumacher; 13 October 1895 Kulm, West Prussia, German Empire (now Chełmno, Poland)
- Died: 20 August 1952 (aged 56) Bonn, West Germany
- Party: Social Democratic (after 1918)
- Education: University of Halle-Wittenberg
- Occupation: Jurist, politician
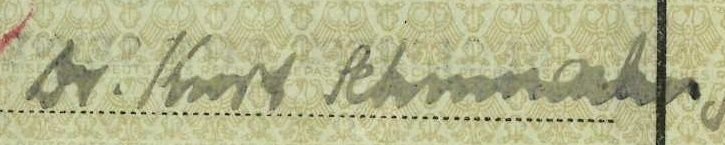
- Signature

Curt Ernst Carl Schumacher, better known as Kurt Schumacher (13 October 1895 – 20 August 1952), was a German politician and resistance fighter against the Nazis. He was chairman of the Social Democratic Party of Germany from 1946 and the first Leader of the Opposition in the Bundestag in West Germany in 1949; he served in both positions until his death.

Upon Adolf Hitler's seizure of power, Schumacher was imprisoned for ten years in various Nazi concentration camps. After World War II, he was one of the founding fathers of postwar German democracy. Throughout his life, he opposed far-right and far-left political movements, including the Nazi Party and the Communist Party of Germany (KPD). Referencing the concept of red fascism, Schumacher described the KPD as "red-painted Nazis".

== Early life and career ==
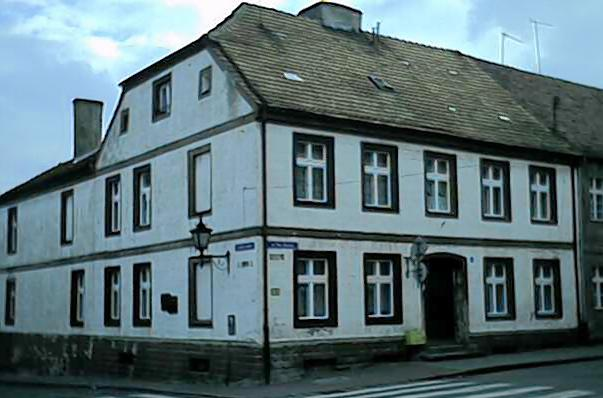
Schumacher's birthplace in Chełmno

Schumacher was born in Kulm, in West Prussia (now Chełmno in Poland), the son of a small businessman who was a member of the liberal German Free-minded Party and deputy in the municipal assembly. As a young man, he was a brilliant student; when the First World War broke out in 1914, he immediately abandoned his studies and joined the Imperial German Army. In December, at Bielawy west of Łowicz in Poland, he was so badly wounded that his right arm had to be amputated. After contracting dysentery, he was finally discharged from the army and was decorated with the Iron Cross Second class. Schumacher returned to his law and political science in Halle, Leipzig, and Berlin, from which he graduated in 1919.

Inspired by Eduard Bernstein, Schumacher became a dedicated socialist and in 1918 joined the Social Democratic Party of Germany (SPD). He led ex-servicemen in forming workers' and soldiers councils in Berlin during the revolutionary days following the fall of the German Empire but opposed attempts by revolutionary left-wing groups to seize power. In 1920, the SPD sent him to Stuttgart to edit the party's newspaper there, the Schwäbische Tagwacht.

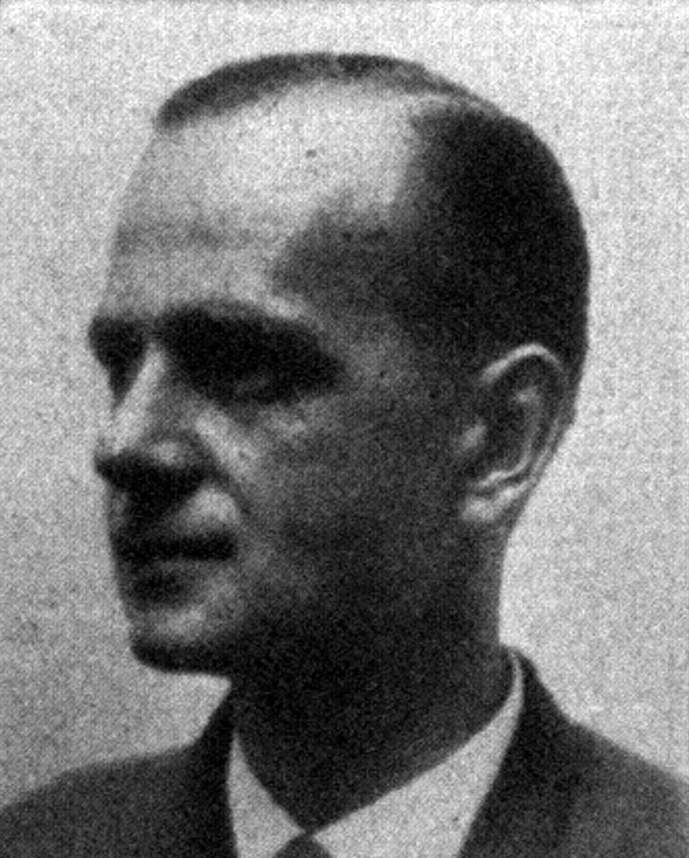
Schumacher's official Reichstag portrait, 1930

Schumacher was elected to the state legislature, the Free People's State of Württemberg Landtag in 1924. He transferred to the local republican organisation "Schwabenland" in the newly founded organisation to defend Germany's parliamentary democracy, the Reichsbanner Schwarz-Rot-Gold. Schumacher became chairman of the Stuttgart Branch of Reichsbanner.

In 1928, Schumacher became the SPD leader in the state of Württemberg. To oppose the emerging Nazi Party, Schumacher helped organise socialist militias to oppose them. In 1930, he was elected to the national legislature, the Reichstag. In August 1932, he was elected to the SPD party leadership group (Parteivorstand). At 38, he was youngest SPD member of the Reichstag.

== Nazi regime ==
Schumacher was staunchly anti-Nazi. In a Reichstag speech on 23 February 1932, he excoriated Nazism as "a continuous appeal to the inner swine in human beings" and stated the movement had been uniquely successful in "ceaselessly mobilizing human stupidity". Schumacher was arrested in July 1933, two weeks before the SPD was banned, and was severely beaten in prison. Schumacher was given the opportunity to sign a declaration in which he renounced any political activity if released; unlike Fritz Bauer and seven other political prisoners, he refused to sign it.

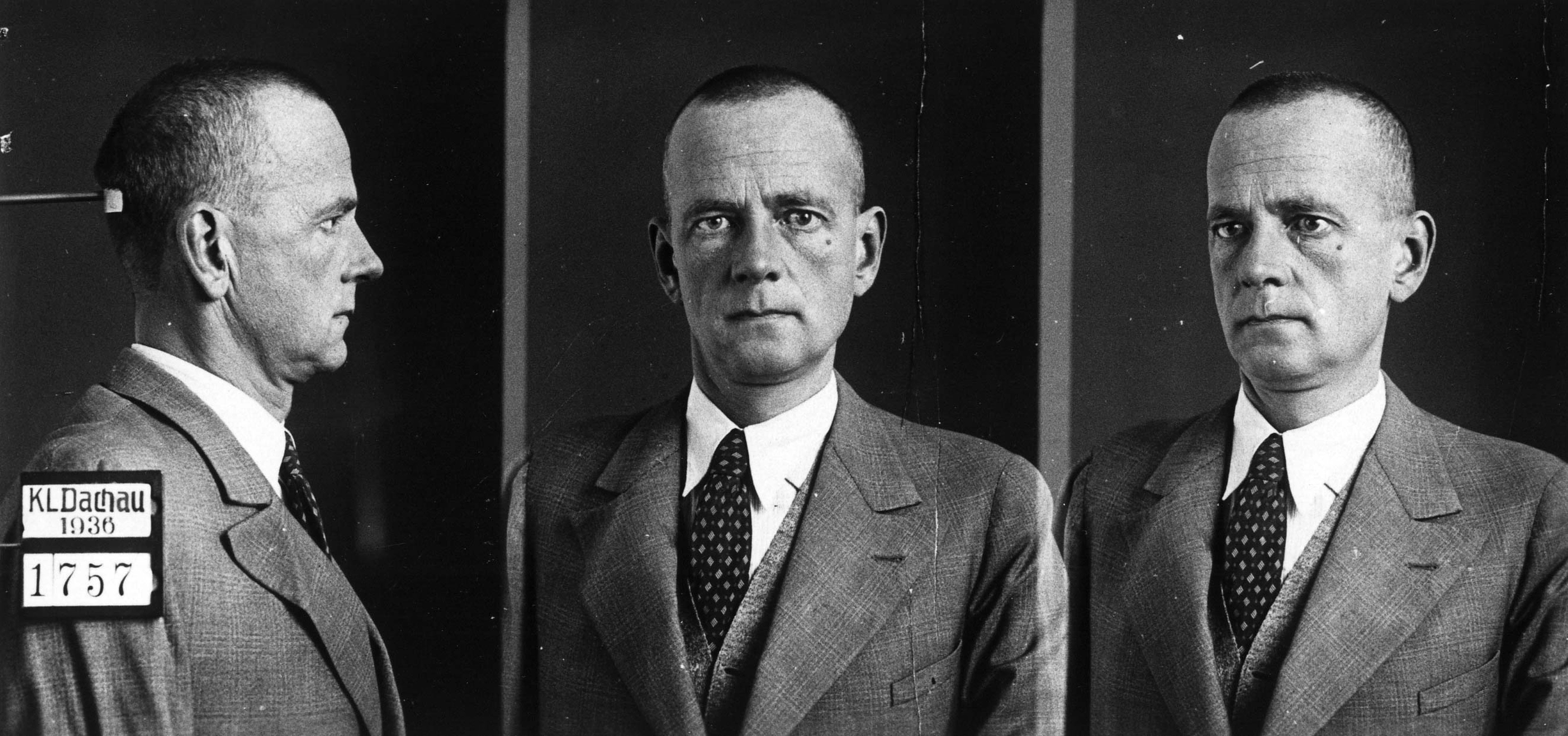
Schumacher's Dachau mugshot, 1936

Schumacher spent the next ten years in Nazi concentration camps at Heuberg, Kuhberg, Flossenbürg, and Dachau. The camps were initially intended for exploitation of those deemed by the Nazis to be undesirable people, such as Jews, socialists, communists, and criminals. Beginning in 1940, the prison camps were overcrowded with transports from the eastern front, leading to disease outbreaks and starvation. Under Action 14f13, beginning in 1941, the Nazis summarily murdered prisoners they deemed unfit for work but Schumacher and some other disabled veterans were spared after they proved with their war medals that they had been disabled in service of Germany during World War I. The conditions in the camps continued to worsen and by 1943, nearly half of the prisoners died, in particular almost half of the 106,000 inmates of Neuengamme concentration camp.

In 1943, when Schumacher was near death, his brother-in-law succeeded in persuading a Nazi official to have him released into his custody. Schumacher was re-arrested in late 1944 and was in Neuengamme when the British arrived in April 1945.

== Postwar ==
Schumacher wanted to lead the SPD and bring Germany to socialism. By May 1945, he was already reorganising the SPD in Hanover without the permission of the occupation authorities. He soon found himself in a battle with Otto Grotewohl, the leader of the SPD in the Soviet Zone of Occupation, who argued the SPD should merge with the KPD to form a united socialist party. Grotewohl had initially opposed the idea but was persuaded that the rise of the Nazis would have never happened had the left presented a unified front. Schumacher was as ardently anti-Communist as he was anti-Nazi, and rejected the proposal. (In fact, as early as 1930, he had referred to Communists as "rotlackierte Doppelausgabe der Nationalsozialisten", i.e., red-painted doubles of the Nazis). As it turned out, when the eastern SPD merged with the KPD to form the Socialist Unity Party of Germany (SED), that party became for all intents and purposes the KPD under a new name. The few recalcitrants from the SPD half of the merger were branded "agents of Schumacher" and shunted aside.

In August 1946, Schumacher called an SPD convention in Hanover, which elected him as the Western leader of the party. In January 1946, the British and the Americans allowed the SPD to reform itself as a national party with Schumacher as leader. As the only SPD leader who had spent the whole Nazi period in Germany without collaborating, he had enormous prestige. He was certain that he had earned the right to lead the new Germany; however, Schumacher met his match in Konrad Adenauer, the former mayor of Cologne, whom the Americans, not wanting to see socialism of any kind in Germany, were grooming for leadership. Adenauer united most of the prewar German conservatives into a new party, the Christian Democratic Union of Germany (CDU). Schumacher campaigned throughout 1948 and 1949 for a united socialist Germany and particularly for the nationalisation of heavy industry, whose owners he blamed for funding the Nazis' rise to power. When the occupying powers opposed his ideas, he denounced them. Adenauer opposed socialism on principle and also argued that the quickest way to get the Allies of World War II to restore self-government to Germany was to co-operate with them.

Schumacher wanted a new constitution with a strong national presidency, a post that he was confident he would win. The first draft of the 1949 Grundgesetz provided for a federal system with a weak national government, as was favoured both by the Allies and the CDU. Schumacher refused to give way and eventually the Allies, keen to get the new German state functioning in the face of the Soviet challenge, acceded to some of Schumacher's demands. The new federal government would be dominant over the states, although the president would have limited powers. Despite his speeches against Nazism, Schumacher had a mixed record on the denazification program:

"Like his CDU rival, Schumacher spoke out against the sweeping nature of the Allied denazification program and the shortcomings of the Allied war crimes trials. He realized the need to incorporate 'small Nazis' – especially former members of the Hitler Youth - into the state, going as far as to demand inclusion of members of the Waffen-SS. He also supported Adenauer's Law 131' from 1951, which granted pensions and voting rights to former NSDAP bureaucrats, policemen, and other officials. He even protested the execution of the last major Nazi war criminals in Landsberg in 1951."

== 1949 federal election ==
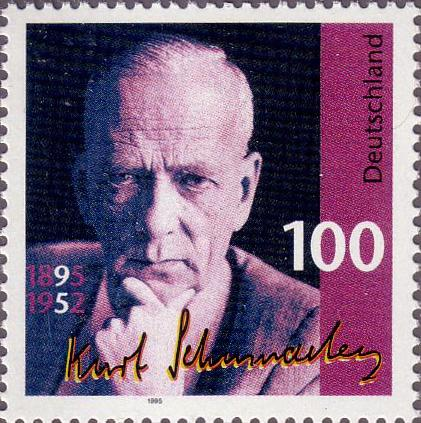
100 pfennigs 1995 postage stamp for his centenary since his birth

The Federal Republic's first national elections were held in August 1949. Schumacher was convinced he would win, and most observers agreed with him; however, Adenauer's new CDU had several advantages over the SPD in the 1949 West German federal election. Much of the SPD's prewar power base was now part of the Soviet Zone, and the most conservative parts of prewar Germany, such as Bavaria and the Rhineland, were in the new Federal Republic of Germany. In addition, the American and the French occupying powers favoured Adenauer and did all they could to assist his campaign though the British remained neutral.

The onset of the Cold War, particularly the behaviour of the Soviets and the German communists in the Soviet Zone, produced an anti-socialist reaction in Germany as elsewhere. The SPD could very plausibly have won an election in 1945 but the tide had turned against it by 1949. That came even as the SPD became increasingly critical of the new East German government. Schumacher was especially critical and once called the communists "red-painted fascists". Schumacher attempted a heavy distinction in the public consciousness between his vision of democratic socialism and the realities in East Germany but still found his party partially damaged by association. Another factor was the recovery of the German economy, mainly because of the currency reform of the CDU's Ludwig Erhard. Matters were further complicated by Schumacher's declining health. In September 1948, he had his left leg amputated.

Although Schumacher's SPD won the most seats of any single party in the election (the CDU and its sister party, the Christian Social Union in Bavaria or CSU, together won more seats), the CDU was able to form a centre-right coalition government with the CSU, the liberal Free Democratic Party, and the national-conservative German Party. Adenauer was elected chancellor, a shock for Schumacher. He refused to co-operate in parliamentary matters and denounced the CDU as agents of the capitalists and foreign powers. Schumacher opposed the emerging new organisations of European co-operation: the Council of Europe, the European Coal and Steel Community, and the European Defence Community. He saw them as devices to strengthen capitalism and to extend Allied control over Germany. That stand aroused the opposition of the other Western European socialist parties and eventually the SPD overruled him and sent delegates to the Council of Europe.

== Death and legacy ==
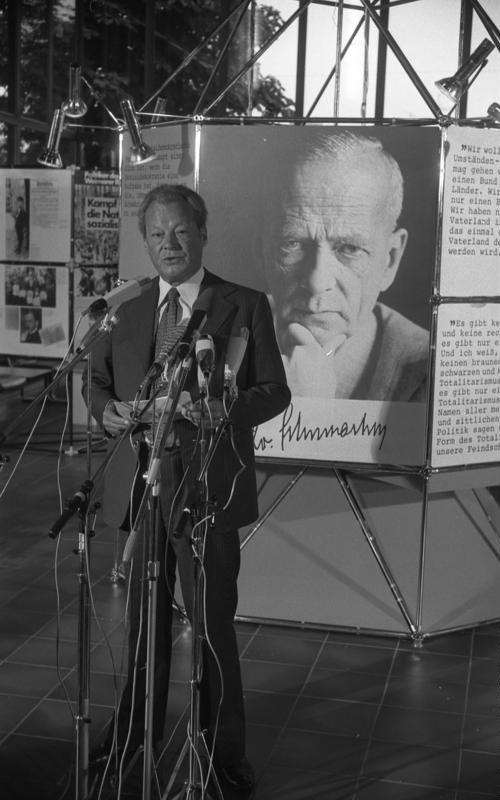
Former West German Chancellor Willy Brandt opens the Kurt Schumacher memorial exhibition in the Erich-Ollenhauer-Haus, 1977.

During the remainder of Adenauer's first term in office, Schumacher continued to oppose his government; the rapid rise in prosperity as part of the German economic miracle, the intensification of the Cold War, and Adenauer's success in gaining Germany's acceptance in the international community all worked to undermine Schumacher's position. The SPD began to have serious doubts about going into another election with Schumacher as leader, particularly after he had a stroke in December 1951. Schumacher, however, soon passed away in August 1952. Schumacher had formulated the preamble of SPD program for the party convention in Dortmund in September 1952. He wrote: "Only a Germany, supported by civic consciousness and social justice, can be successful in fending off totalitarian tendencies."

== Bibliography ==
- Judt, Tony (2006). Postwar A History of Europe Since 1945. Penguin. ISBN 978-0-14-303775-0.
- Plener, Ulla (2002). "Kurt Schumacher 1949–1952 - Die innere Gestaltung der BRD im Schatten seines Antikommunismus". Jahrbuch für Forschungen zur Geschichte der Arbeiterbewegung (3).

Party political offices
Preceded by Hans Vogel	Chairman of the Social Democratic Party of Germany; 1946–1952	Succeeded by Erich Ollenhauer
