= Ira Rischowski =

Refugee engineer

Ira Rischowksi
- Rischowski at Darmstadt in 1919
- Born: 1 August 1899
- Died: 1989 (aged 89–90); Keswick, Cumbria
- Education: Technical University, Darmstadt
- Occupation: Engineer
- Organization: Women's Engineering Society

Ira (Irene) Rischowski (1 August 1899 – 1989) was one of Germany's first female engineers and active in the German anti-Nazi resistance group Neu Beginnen before fleeing to Britain. In the UK she became a member of the Women's Engineering Society, serving on the Council and supporting efforts to encourage British women to become engineers.

== Early career ==
Rischowski was born in Germany in 1899 to Albert Rischowski (b. 10 January 1848 - ) and Ida née Salomonsohn (12 June 1867– 26 November 1943), the eldest of four children. The family were Jewish by heritage but the children were baptised. Albert Rischowski ran shipyards and took young Ira with him to watch the riveting of the ships which inspired her to become an engineer.

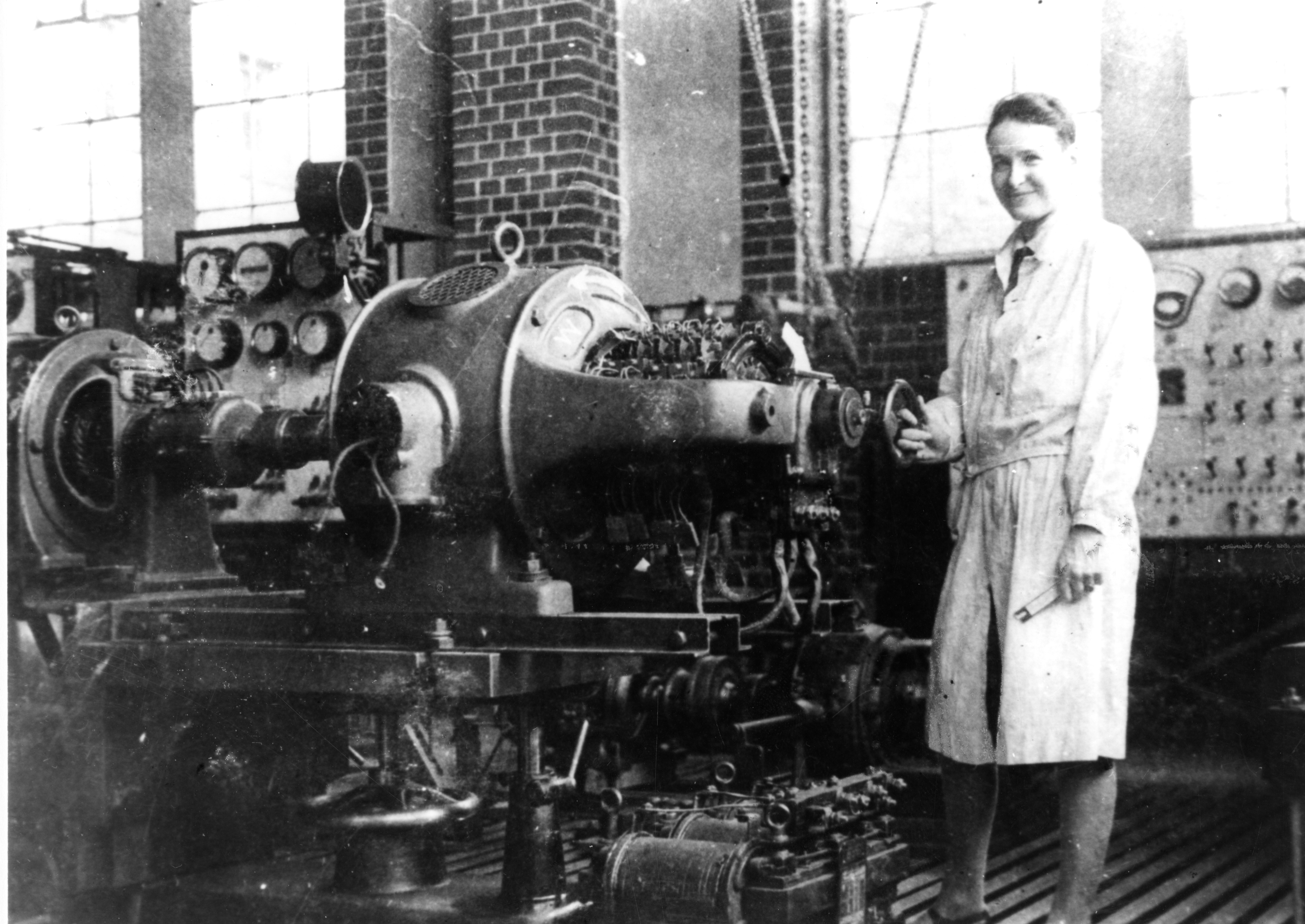
Rischowski at TH Darmstadt c.1920 - 22

In 1919, Rischowski enrolled as the first female engineering student at the Technical University of Darmstadt. Her successful application was supported by six months experience repairing agricultural equipment. From 1928, Rischowski was employed as an engineer, following training at the electrical company Siemens-Schuckert. In 1930 Rischowski became a member of Germany's central engineering institution, the Verein Deutscher Ingenieure (VDI). In 1933, there was a women's section in the VDI, but Rischowski refused to join it since it was affiliated with the Nazi Party.

In 2019, the Institute for Nuclear Physics at Technical University of Darmstadt created the Rischowski scholarship programme for female students in her honour.

== Anti-Nazi Resistance ==
Rischowski joined the underground anti-fascist group Neu Beginnen in 1932 and became a key clandestine operative with codename 'Gabriele'. She was responsible for encoding and decoding correspondence with comrades abroad. In 1933, the group's operational office moved to Potsdamer Platz in Berlin, masquerading as an engineering consultancy. Rischowski worked at disguising Marxist literature, and transferring documents to the Social Democratic Party in exile in Prague.

== Seeking Refuge ==
In September 1935, Rischowski was arrested while attempting to move banned literature to a safe place. She managed to talk herself free, but fearing surveillance, quickly fled to Prague. In July 1936 she moved on to the UK through the domestic servant visa scheme.

Rischowski was invited by Caroline Haslett to attend meetings of the Women's Engineering Society, and she became an associate member in 1939, giving her profession as "engineer, technical secretary graduated" in the 1939 Register for England and Wales.

Interned for a year at the Rushen Camp on the Isle of Man as an enemy alien, she was released without restrictions in November 1941 on appeal

== Career ==
She worked as a draughtsman and planning engineer, first at Tuvox Ltd and later at James Gordon Ltd, where she became Head of Projects. In 1950, she and fellow Women's Engineering Society members, Winifred Hackett and Sheila Leather published a report on equal pay for women in engineering, which concluded that there was "no justification for lower salary scales for women". Rischowski was the accommodation secretary for the second International Conference of Women Engineers and Scientists held in Cambridge in 1967, whilst working as a consultant in power generation for Elliott Process Automation.

== Family life ==
Rischowski met her future husband Fritz Bruno Karthäuser (1898–1973) while studying engineering at the Technical University of Darmstadt. They married in December 1922, and they had two daughters. Their first child Hellen Isot was born in 1924 and their second Herta Maria (Kindi) in 1930. Bruno and Ira divorced in 1933. When she was forced into exile in 1935, Rischowski left her children in the care of her elderly mother Ida in Berlin until 1938 when, with support from members of the Women's Engineering Society and their connections, she was able to bring them both to London. Ida was deported to the Theresienstadt Ghetto where she died in 1943.

On her death in 1989, the then WES President Dorothy Hatfield called Rischowski "an inspiration to us all".

== Family memorial ==
Rischowski's sister Edith Novak donated a seventeenth century silver cup, made by Hans Paulus, to the Victoria & Albert Museum, to remember "her mother Ira [sic] Rischowski, her aunt Rosa Friedlander and Hedwig Malachowski, and in gratitude for the safety found by younger members of her family in the British Commonwealth" (Ira is a mistake for Ida).
