= Erich Ollenhauer =

German politician (1901–1963)

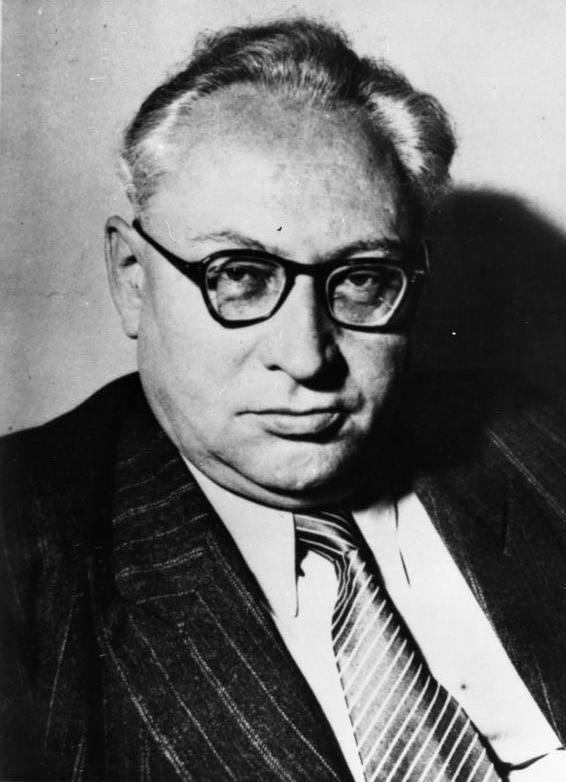
- Ollenhauer in 1953

President of the Socialist International
- In office 9 September 1963 – 14 December 1963
- Preceded by: Alsing Andersen
- Succeeded by: Bruno Pittermann

Leader of the Opposition
- In office 27 September 1952 – 14 December 1963
- Chancellor: Konrad Adenauer; Ludwig Erhard
- Preceded by: Kurt Schumacher
- Succeeded by: Fritz Erler

Leader of the Social Democratic Party
- In office 27 September 1952 – 14 December 1963
- Preceded by: Kurt Schumacher
- Succeeded by: Willy Brandt

Member of the Bundestag
- In office 7 September 1949 – 14 December 1963
- Preceded by: Constituency established
- Succeeded by: Willi Wolf
- Constituency: Bochum (1949–1953); Stadt Hannover-Süd (1953–1963)

Personal details
- Born: 27 March 1901 Magdeburg, Germany
- Died: 14 December 1963 (aged 62) Bonn, West Germany
- Party: Social Democratic

Erich Ollenhauer (27 March 1901 – 14 December 1963) was the leader of the Social Democratic Party of Germany (SPD) from 1952 until 1963. He was a key leader of the opposition to Konrad Adenauer in the Bundestag. In exile under the Nazis, he returned to Germany in February 1946, becoming vice chairman of the SPD. He was a close ally of the chairman Kurt Schumacher, and worked on party organization. Where Schumacher was a passionate intellectual, Ollenhauer was a thorough and efficient bureaucrat. He became party leader after Schumacher's death in 1952. Besides attending to organizational details, his main role was moderating the tension between the left-wing and right-wing factions. He remained party leader until his death, but yielded to the charismatic Berlin mayor Willy Brandt in 1961 as the party's candidate for chancellor.

== Early political career and exile ==
Ollenhauer was born in Magdeburg and joined the SPD in 1920. When the Nazis took power in 1933 he fled Germany for Prague. After the outbreak of WW2 Ollenhauer travelled across Europe in order to avoid Nazi persecution, first going to Denmark, then France, Spain, Portugal, and eventually London, where he remained until the end of the war. In London, he kept close ties to the Labour Party, which financially supported the expatriate SPD (called SoPaDe), of which Ollenhauer was a member. He also worked with the Union of German Socialist Organisations in Great Britain.

In February 1946, Ollenhauer returned to Germany. In May the same year, he was voted deputy leader of the SPD, behind Kurt Schumacher. Ollenhauer entered the Bundestag after the 1949 German federal elections.

== Leadership of the SPD ==
After Schumacher's unexpected death in 1952, the SPD elected Ollenhauer as its leader. He ran as the SPD's candidate for Chancellor of Germany in the 1953 and 1957 German elections, both of which were lost to Konrad Adenauer's CDU.

In 1957, Ollenhauer called for a trans-European security alliance (in place of NATO and the Warsaw Pact), in which a reunified Germany would serve as an equal partner. The plan was then denounced as radical, but it helped pave the way for Willy Brandt's Ostpolitik and indirectly influencing some developments within the European Union, such as a European common security policy, and the eventual reunification of Germany. Ollenhauer's proposal is also known as the Ollenhauer Plan.

In 1961, Ollenhauer declined to run for Chancellor a third time and instead supported the candidacy of Berlin mayor Willy Brandt.

Ollenhauer died in Bonn on 14 December 1963 from pulmonary embolism.

Party political offices
Preceded by Kurt Schumacher	Leader of the Social Democratic Party of Germany; 1952–1963	Succeeded by Willy Brandt
Preceded by Alsing Andersen	President of the Socialist International; 1963	Succeeded by Bruno Pittermann
