= Volkswacht (Danzig) =

- Founded: September 1910
- Ceased publication: 1919
- Political alignment: Social Democratic Party of Germany
- Language: German
- Headquarters: Danzig
- Sister newspapers: Vorwärts

Volkswacht ('People's Guard') was a social democratic newspaper published in Danzig, Germany (present-day Gdańsk, Poland) from 1910 to 1919. Initially, Volkswacht was published weekly. As of 1913, it was published twice weekly. In 1914 it was converted into a daily newspaper. The newspaper masthead carried the slogan Organ für die werktätige Bevölkerung in Westpreußen ('Organ of the toiling population in West Prussia'). It was issued as a publication of the Free Trade Unions.

Volkswacht was founded in September 1910. August Bebel wrote an editorial for the inaugural issue of the newspaper.

Due to financial difficulties the Social Democratic Party of Germany (SPD) had lacked an organ of its own in Danzig for a long time. The new publication was maintained by funds from the central party leadership in Berlin. Arthur Crispien worked as editor of Volkswacht 1910–1912. Gustav Schröder took over as editor after Crispien.

The newspaper played an important role in spreading social democratic ideas in the region. The readership of Volkswacht was at pair with the bourgeois Danziger Zeitung. On political issues the article material largely consisted of reprints from the SPD central organ Vorwärts. The Volkswacht editors focused more on writing about local matters.

During the First World War, Volkswacht was placed under preventive censorship.

Julius Gehl became editor of Volkwacht in 1917 with Walter Reek heading the press commission. The readership of Volkswacht increased after the outbreak of the November Revolution. In 1920 Volkswacht was replaced by Danziger Volksstimme ('People's Voice of Danzig').
