= Otto Wels =

German politician (1873–1939)

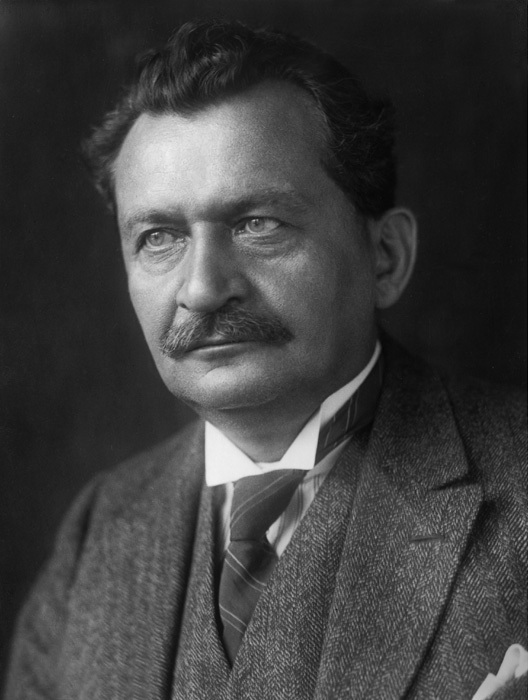
- Wels in 1924

Chairman of the Social Democratic Party of Germany
- In office 14 June 1919 – 16 September 1939
- Serving with: Hermann Müller (1919–1931); Arthur Crispien (1922–1933); Hans Vogel (1931–1939)
- Preceded by: Friedrich Ebert; Philipp Scheidemann
- Succeeded by: Hans Vogel

Member of the Reichstag
- In office 24 June 1920 – 22 June 1933
- Preceded by: Constituency established
- Succeeded by: Constituency abolished
- Constituency: Frankfurt an der Oder
- In office 7 February 1912 – 9 November 1918
- Preceded by: Adolf Wilhelm Henning
- Succeeded by: Constituency abolished
- Constituency: Frankfurt 10

Member of the National Assembly for Frankfurt an der Oder
- In office 6 February 1919 – 21 May 1920
- Preceded by: Office established
- Succeeded by: Office abolished

Personal details
- Born: 15 September 1873 Berlin, Prussia, Germany
- Died: 16 September 1939 (aged 66) Paris, France
- Resting place: Cimetière Nouveau de Châtenay-Malabry, France
- Party: SPD (1891–1939)
- Spouse: Bertha Antonie Reske (m. 1893)
- Children: Walter; Hugo
- Occupation: Politician; Labor Leader; Paper Hanger

Military service
- Allegiance: German Empire
- Branch/service: Imperial German Army
- Years of service: 1895–1897
- Other offices held: 1923–1938: Executive Representative, Labour and Socialist International
- Wels's voice Portion of Wels's speech against the Enabling Act of 1933; Recorded 23 March 1933

Otto Wels (15 September 1873 – 16 September 1939) was a German politician who served as a member of the Reichstag from 1912 to 1933 and as the chairman of the Social Democratic Party (SPD) from 1919 until his death in 1939. He was the military commander of Berlin in the turbulent early days of the German Revolution of 1918–1919, and during the 1920 Kapp Putsch he was instrumental in organizing the general strike that helped defeat the anti-republican putschists. Near the end of the Weimar Republic's life, however, he saw the futility of calling a general strike against the 1932 Prussian coup d'état because of the mass unemployment of the Great Depression.

His 1933 speech in the Reichstag in opposition to Adolf Hitler and the Enabling Act marked the end of the Weimar Republic prior to the Act becoming law. After the passage of the Act effectively gave Hitler dictatorial power, Wels fled the country and established the SPD exile organization Sopade. He died in Paris in 1939, two weeks after the start of World War II.

== Early life and career ==
Born in Berlin on 15 September 1873, Wels was the son of an innkeeper (Johann Wels and his wife Johanne). The restaurant, which served as a meeting place for early SPD supporters, exposed Wels to the workers' movement at a young age. In 1891, he began an apprenticeship as a paper hanger and joined the SPD. Around 1893, he married Bertha Antonie Reske, a seamstress. They had two sons, Walter and Hugo. In the early 1890s, he represented other workers in the Berlin Craftsmen's Chamber and was elected the first chairman of the local SPD branch. From 1895 to 1897, he performed his military service in the German Army, where he was harassed by officers due to his politics (he was not granted leave during his entire service period). On finishing his military service, he enrolled at the Workers' Educational Society in Berlin before returning to politics. He was unsuccessful in his re-election bid for SPD local chairman (District Five) but continued to campaign until he was elected a representative in the new SPD party organisation in 1901.

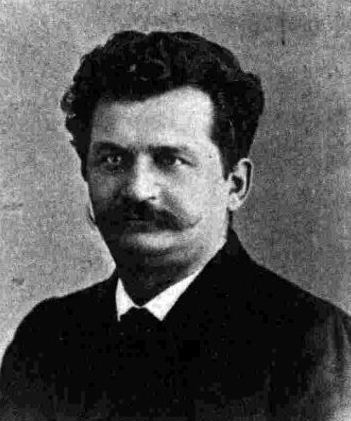
Wels's official Reichstag portrait, 1912

From 1906, he worked as a trade union official and party secretary in the Province of Brandenburg and on the press committee of Vorwärts, the SPD's party newspaper. In 1912, he was elected to the Reichstag, and with the support of August Bebel, the chairman and one of the founders of the SPD, he joined the SPD executive committee the next year. His position on the committee allowed him to take a central role in the development of the SPD.

During the First World War, Wels supported Burgfriedenspolitik, the political truce between Germany's political parties under which the trade unions refrained from striking, the SPD voted for war credits and the parties agreed not to criticize the government and its handling of the war.

== Weimar Republic ==
=== German Revolution ===
On 9 November 1918, the date of the proclamation of the republic in Germany, Wels spoke to the Naumburg rifle brigade at their request to explain the political situation following the collapse of the German Empire at the end of World War I. The brigade was one of the units considered especially loyal to Emperor Wilhelm II that had been brought into the city as reinforcements against revolutionary activity. Wels convinced the soldiers that to avoid a civil war they should not use their weapons. At the end of his speech, the brigade went over in a body to the side of the supporters of the German Revolution. Buoyed by his success, Wels spoke at other barracks so persuasively that he was credited with keeping the death toll that day to just fifteen.

Also on 9 November, Wels became a member of the revolutionary Workers' and Soldiers' Council of Berlin. He advocated successfully for the Independent Social Democratic Party (USPD) – a more leftist and anti-war group that had broken away from the SPD in 1917 – to be represented equally with the SPD on the Council. The next day, he was made military commander of Berlin.

=== Christmas crisis ===
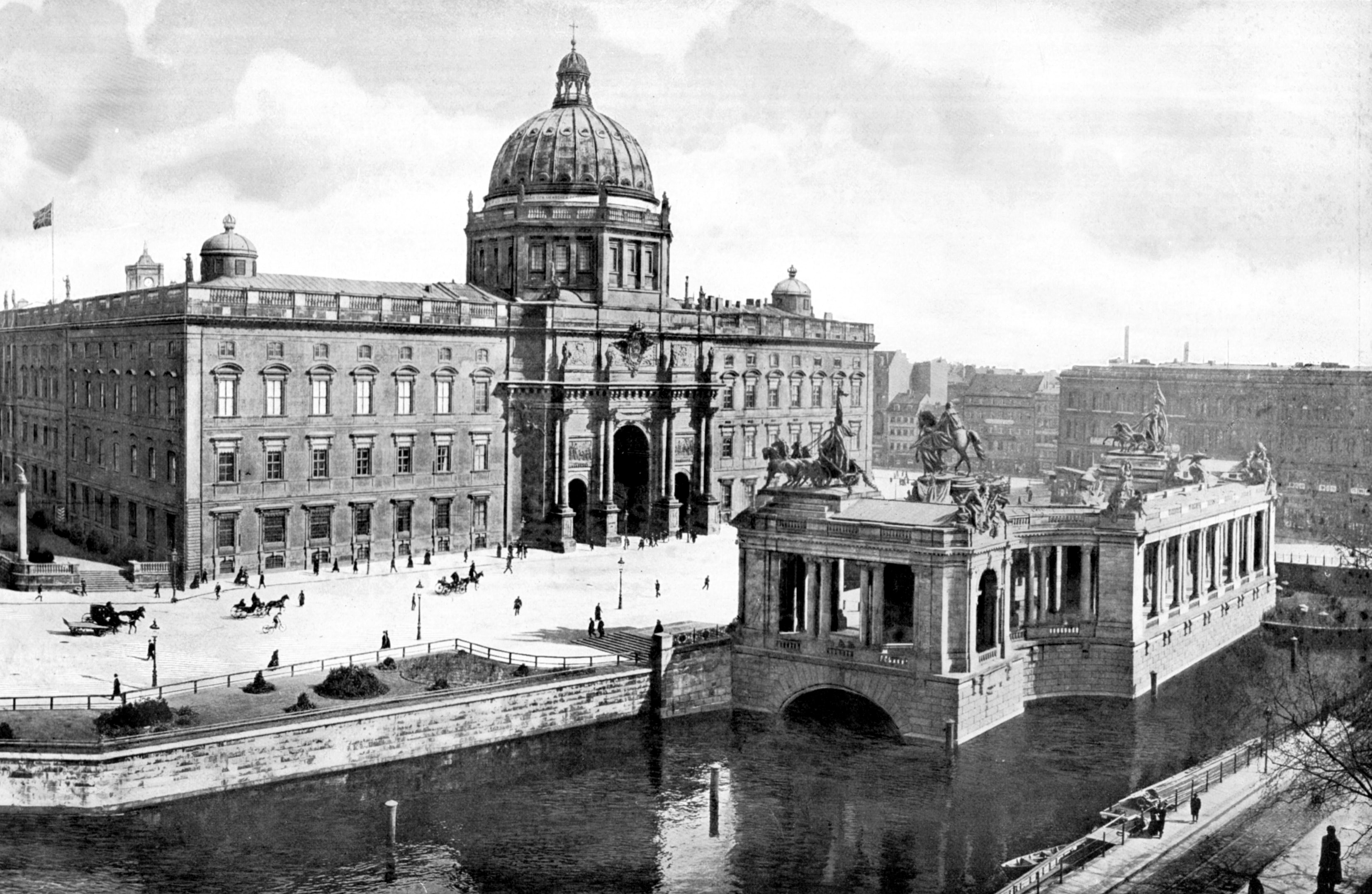
The Berlin Palace, with the Emperor Wilhelm Memorial, c. 1900

The Volksmarinedivision was the revolution's main military unit in Berlin and as such under Wels' control. In December 1918, the Council of People's Deputies, Germany's temporary government, ordered the division to move outside Berlin and reduce the number of its soldiers. When they refused, Wels withheld their pay to force them to comply. During the week before Christmas, he attempted to negotiate with them, but when no progress was made, they detained and maltreated him. Assaults on the division's locations at the Berlin Palace and Neuer Marstall by regular troops loyal to the government – the 1918 Christmas crisis – failed to dislodge the mutineers. Negotiations led to a compromise under which the Volksmarinedivision, in exchange for receiving its back pay and remaining a unit, vacated the Palace and Marstall and freed Wels, who was forced to step down from his position as city commander.

=== Crises of the republic ===
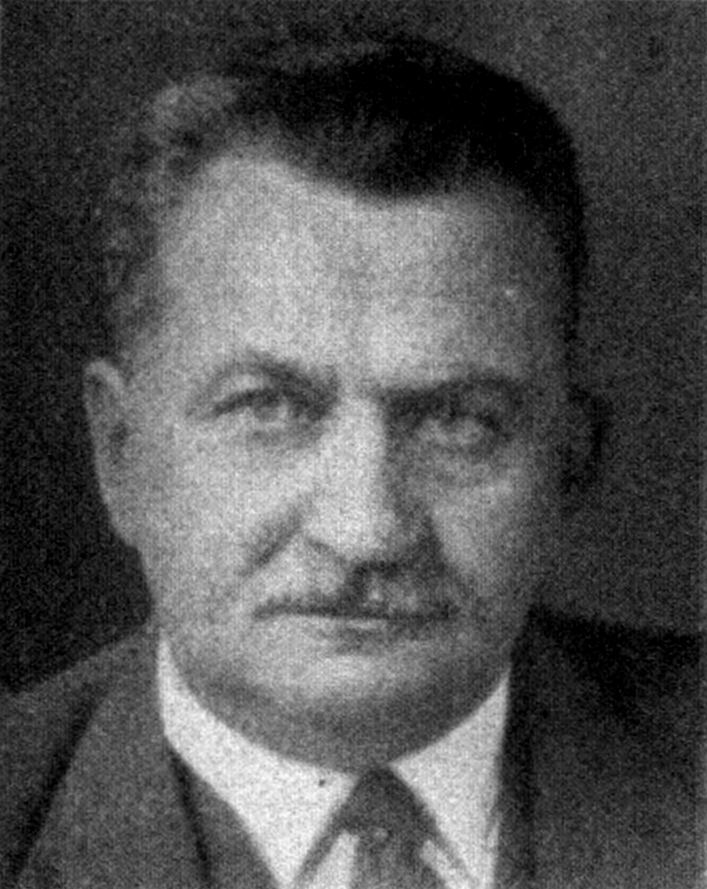
Wels's official Reichstag portrait, 1932

After Friedrich Ebert of the SPD was elected German President on 11 February 1919, Wels acted as the party's presiding officer and was formally elected co-chairman with Hermann Müller on 14 June. From 6 February 1919 to 21 May 1920, Wels was a member of the Weimar National Assembly, Germany's interim parliament and constitutional convention, where he sat on the Committee for the Preliminary Consultation of the Draft Constitution of the German Reich. Following the completion of the Assembly's work, he was elected to the new Reichstag of the Weimar Republic.

During the 1920 Kapp Putsch, Wels and union leader Carl Legien led the general strike that was central to ending the putsch, and afterwards demanded the resignation of his party colleague Gustav Noske as Reichswehr minister. He played a key role in founding the paramilitary Iron Front and Reichsbanner Schwarz-Rot-Gold in defence of Germany's parliamentary democracy against the rising extremist forces of the Nazi SA, Der Stahlhelm and the communist-led Rotfrontkämpferbund.

In 1923, Wels became a member of the executive board of the Labour and Socialist International.

After the 1930 Reichstag election, which saw the Nazi Party gain 95 seats, Wels advocated the toleration of the cabinet of Chancellor Heinrich Brüning, even though Brüning was heading a presidential cabinet that bypassed the Reichstag and ruled by presidential decree. The SPD feared that if they voted for a no-confidence motion against Brüning, there could be new elections that would strengthen the Nazi's position even more.

In the July 1932 Prussian coup d'état, Chancellor Franz von Papen ousted the elected government of Prussia and took over control of Germany's largest state as Reich Commissioner, a move that was seen as a major blow to democracy in the Republic. Wels nevertheless argued against calling a general strike to oppose Papen. Because of the mass unemployment in Germany at the time, Wels thought that workers would not be able to force Papen to back down. Following the Reichstag election of November 1932 in which the Nazis lost seats, Wels rejected any negotiations with the new chancellor, Kurt von Schleicher.

== Enabling Act ==
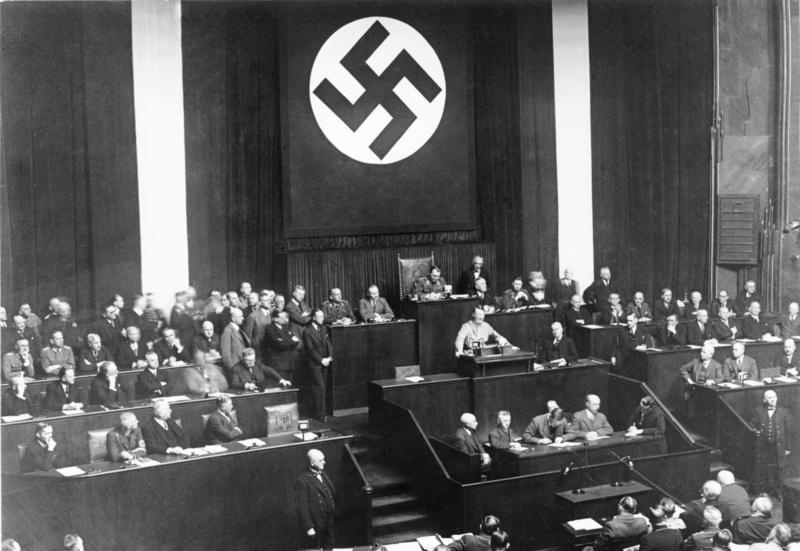
Hitler's Reichstag speech promoting the Enabling Act, which Wels countered, was delivered at the Kroll Opera House as a result of the Reichstag fire.

Wels had underestimated Adolf Hitler and was taken by surprise when President Paul von Hindenburg named him chancellor on 30 January 1933. The SPD saw the move as constitutional and called on its members to use restraint. Following the promulgation of the Reichstag Fire Decree on 28 February, Wels was threatened with arrest and fled with his family to Austria, but he returned in early March. The SPD by then saw that the proposed Enabling Act, which would give Hitler's cabinet the right to pass laws without the consent of the Reichstag for a four-year period, presented a mortal threat to the rule of law and the democratic constitution. When they decided to oppose it, Wels volunteered to give the speech against Hitler, saying "I will do it. (...) This is about the party and the honour of the party."

=== Speech in opposition ===
Wels gave his speech on 23 March 1933, during the last session of the multi-party Reichstag. He began by agreeing with Reich Chancellor Adolf Hitler's demand for equal treatment of Germany among the nations of the world and stated that he, Wels, "was the first German who stood up to the untruth of Germany's guilt for the outbreak of the world war before an international forum". He went on to say that the SPD agreed with another statement of Hitler's, that "from the lunacy of the theory of eternal winners and losers came the madness of reparations and, in their wake, the catastrophe of the world economy". He then quoted from the speech that Chancellor Gustav Bauer of the SPD gave on 23 July 1919 following the resignation of the Scheidemann cabinet in protest against the terms of the Treaty of Versailles:

We are defenseless; defenseless but not without honor [Wehrlos ist aber nicht ehrlos]. To be sure, the enemies are after our honor, there is no doubt. However, that this attempt at defamation will one day redound back upon the instigators, that it is not our honor that is being destroyed by this global catastrophe, that is our belief to the last breath.

He went on to say that a dictated peace has few blessings "at home" because it is not based on equal law between nations and, similarly, that if a government makes internal laws against violent words and deeds, they must be applied impartially. Defeated political opponents cannot be treated as if they were proscribed. Picking up again the idea of honor from Bauer's 1919 speech, he said:

Freedom and life can be taken from us, but not our honor. After the persecutions that the Social Democratic Party has suffered recently, no one will reasonably demand or expect that it vote for the Enabling Act.

He continued by enumerating the major accomplishments of the SPD in the Weimar Reichstag and accused the National Socialists of being nationalist but not socialist. If they were socialist, he said, they would have the people behind them and not need an Enabling Act. The SPD understood the Nazi's form of power politics and also that the people's sense of justice was a political power to which they would continue to appeal. He ended his speech with the following words:

In this historic hour, we German Social Democrats solemnly pledge ourselves to the principles of humanity and justice, of freedom and socialism. No Enabling Act gives you the power to destroy ideas that are eternal and indestructible. ... German social democracy will draw new strength also from the latest persecutions. We greet the persecuted and the oppressed. We greet our friends in Germany. Your steadfastness and loyalty deserve admiration. The courage of your convictions and your unbroken optimism guarantee a brighter future.

All 94 SPD members of the Reichstag who were present voted against the act. Using the powers of the Reichstag Fire Decree, the Nazis had detained several SPD deputies, and others had already fled into exile. The Communists had been banned and so could not vote. The rest of the Reichstag voted in favour. Nazi intimidation had worked so well that even if all 120 SPD deputies had been present and voted against it, the Enabling Act would have still passed with the required two-thirds majority for a constitutional amendment.

The passage of the Enabling Act marked the end of parliamentary democracy in Germany and formed the legal authority for Hitler's dictatorship. Within weeks of the passage of the Enabling Act, the Hitler government banned the SPD, and the other German political parties chose to dissolve to avoid persecution, making the Nazi Party the only legal political party in Germany.

== Exile and death ==
In June 1933, Wels went into exile in the Territory of the Saar Basin, which at the time was under League of Nations control. From there he moved to exile in Prague, where he established the Sopade, the exile organization of the SPD. In August 1933, he was deprived of his German citizenship.

As a result of the Munich Agreement, Wels had to leave Prague and went to Paris at the end of 1938, where he died on 16 September 1939 of natural causes at the age of 66. He was buried in the Cimetière Nouveau cemetery at Châtenay-Malabry.

== Legacy ==
In his memoirs, the former chancellor Heinrich Brüning described Otto Wels as "Germany's bravest man in the fight against Hitler".
