= John Olday =

Anarchist artist (1905–1977)

- Born: Arthur William Oldag; 10 April 1905; London, England, United Kingdom
- Died: 1977 (aged 71–72); United Kingdom
- Occupations: Artist, cartoonist, writer
- Notable work: Kingdom of Rags
- Other political affiliations: Spartacus League; KJVD
- Movement: Anarchism
- Criminal charges: Identity fraud and desertion
- Criminal penalty: Imprisonment
- Spouse: Hilde Meisel (m. 1938; died 1945)
- Armed conflict
- Conflicts: November Revolution; World War II
- Years: 1918-1925, 1938-1945
- Unit: Royal Pioneer Corps (deserted)
- Battles: Kiel mutiny; Spartacist uprising; German October; Anti-Nazi resistance

John Olday (10 April 1905 – 1977), birth name Arthur William Oldag, was born in London to a Scottish father and a German mother. He was brought up in New York City, and Germany. He became an artist, cartoonist and writer, and anarchist revolutionary. He was politically active in Germany, France and England in the 1930s and 1940s, and lived in Australia during the 1950s and 1960s. Returning to London in about 1970, he remained active in anarchist groups until his death in 1977.

== Early life ==
Born out of wedlock in 1905 in London, Olday is recorded as having no memory of his Scottish father. His German mother moved to New York City, where he was brought up until age 8 (1913), after which his mother returned to Germany and left him with his grandmother in Hamburg. His mother apparently returned to New York and American citizenship. In urban Hamburg, the child's life was immediately blighted by the onset of World War I and a hunger crisis precipitated by agricultural manpower losses and the Allied blockade of Germany In 1916, at the age of 11, he was a participant in workers' unrest against severe food shortages and black-market practices of the day.

Later Olday became active in the tumultuous unrest of the Kiel mutiny and the resultant November Revolution, reportedly "acting as an ammunition hauler for a Spartacist machine-gun emplacement. When the year-long struggle was crushingly defeated, he made a last-minute escape, narrowly avoiding certain execution"—but continued in violent activist causes until 1925, at age 20.

While still a teenager, Olday joined the Young Communist League of Germany but was expelled for “anarchist deviations”.

He turned to the anarchist movement and took part in a militia unit during the uprisings of October 1923, then was active in the Ruhr region of Germany, where the anarchists had thousands of supporters, particularly among miners and factory workers. There he propagated ideas of workers' councils.

== Artistic career ==
=== Hamburg, 1925–1938 ===
The few available sources (including some deemed autobiographical) indicate that Olday, having reached the age of 20, had chosen to exercise his talents as a draughtsman, cartoonist and writer, by which he could continue to advance revolutionary causes without offering himself as direct cannon-fodder. Withdrawing from participation in activist groups,

...he soon developed into a recognized political cartoonist and expressionistic graphic artist. His socially critical theater-pieces, performed in Hamburg cabarets, also brought him renown. During this period, it appears that he spent his time completely on a career as a graphic artist and author.

The same source asserts that Olday's artistic and cabaret skills (and homosexual mannerisms) bestowed on him a position of privilege among "the highest circles" of the Hamburg Nazi Party, providing him with access to information which he was able to use to warn revolutionary friends and save them from committal to concentration camps. When the Nazis came to power in 1933, he renewed active links with former Anarcho-Sparticist colleagues and joined an active anti-authoritarian campaign against Hitler's dictatorship. He wrote regularly for a Hamburg newspaper. He also worked closely with Industrial Workers of the World (IWW) union seafarers coming into the port of Hamburg. Inevitably, his behaviour attracted the attention of the Gestapo who were about to arrest him as he fled to England in 1937. He had been granted a British passport that year in Hamburg on production of his birth certificate.

=== London, 1937–1950 ===
Olday took with him to England the draft of an autobiographical book, Kingdom of Rags, written in German, which was translated into English and published by Jarrolds, in 1939. This is an account of his life in Germany, illustrated with anti-Nazi cartoons.

In 1938 he entered into a marriage of convenience with Hilde Meisel (alias Hilda Monte), a member of the Internationaler Sozialistischer Kampfbund, who thus acquired British nationality.

The transient relationship with Meisel reflected the active involvement of both in regular and dangerous assignments on the Continent in the months leading to the outbreak of war.

With funds from anti-Chamberlain parliamentarians Olday coordinated the sinking of a Nazi munitions ship off the Dutch coast and the killing of a Jewish quisling in Antwerp. He also wrote the text of an appeal to German workers to sabotage the Nazi war industry.

When compulsory military service was instituted in Britain in 1940, Olday was to have served as a sapper, but he deserted before he could be sent to 'the imperialist war’. He remained at large until 1944, drawing caustic political cartoons and caricatures, working as an editor and, with two well-known libertarian activists (Marie Louise Berneri and Vernon Richards), writing a fortnightly anti-militarist broadsheet distributed to soldiers in the British Army. At the same time he provided numerous drawings and poems for a Scandinavian paper, the Industrial Worker, distributed in German ports,

and produced, along with the English anti-militarist broadsheet, Forces Newsletter, in a small studio shared with Philip Sansom. Arrested for stealing a typewriter for Freedom Press,

In January 1945 he was sentenced to a year’s imprisonment, having been found guilty of 'theft through the finding and fraudulent use of an identity card’. He served eight months, gained early release then was immediately taken to prison camp by the military authorities to serve another 2 years for desertion. A public campaign by 'Freedom Press Defence Campaign’ friends supported by sympathisers like Herbert Read and George Orwell resulted in his release after only 3 months. The Adelaide Quaker artist Mary P. Harris believed that Olday drew passionate anti-war cartoons and pictures while imprisoned in Wormwood Scrubs as a conscientious objector during the war. 'Even while in prison… his leaflets, his drawings of the agony of war and its circumstances were leafletted by air over Germany’, she wrote in her autobiography (p.46).

=== Australia (1950-1970) ===
Olday emigrated from the United Kingdom to Sydney in early 1950 and moved to Adelaide where he worked as an art gallery attendant and donated a collection of his paintings to the Art Gallery of South Australia.

He later spent time in Melbourne where he "continued his artistic-cultural-political activities" while employed as a hospital worker before returning to Sydney where he conducted "adult education classes, mime shows, recordings, radio broadcasts and exhibitions and advocacy of gay liberation".

==== Sydney (1963-1969) ====
In 1963 Olday is recorded as presenting masterly folksong recitals on a spacious houseboat moored off the northern-beach suburb of Clontarf.

In 1967, Olday opened a communal arts centre in the inner suburb of Paddington where he impressed visitors with his versatile talents ("He sings, he writes, he composes, he paints, he acts") and his sincerity, "the result of profound experience of sadness and life".

=== London (1970-1977) ===
He returned to Europe in the late 1960s, settling in London in 1970 and remaining politically active until his death of stomach cancer in 1977.

== Bibliography ==
- Kingdom of Rags, Jarrolds, London, 1939
- The March to Death Freedom Press, London. May 1943, Reprinted May 1995. ePub at Open Library

== See also ==
- Freedom Defence Committee
- War Commentary
