= Union of German Socialist Organisations in Great Britain =

The Union of German Socialist Organisations in Great Britain (German: Union deutscher sozialistischer Organisation in Großbritannien) was the amalgamation of German socialist and social democratic oriented organisations of exiled Germans during World War II.

== Background and political positions ==
The Union was founded on 6 March 1941 after an earlier attempt at a cooperative organisation of exiled German socialists representing the various exiled parties failed. The member organisations of the Union were the Sopade, the exile organisation of the Social Democratic Party, the Socialist Workers' Party, the Internationaler Sozialistischer Kampfbund and the Resistance group, Neu Beginnen. In addition, there was a representative of trade unions.

Political statements were drawn up, jointly, when possible, and each member party had the right to veto. The goal was to fight against the Hitler regime together, while maintaining the independence of the individual organisations. The parties did not merge into one because of the very different positions held by the different exile groups. They preferred deferring that decision till later, so it could be made by all the socialists in Germany. The Union was not to serve as a contact for other organisations, unions, the authorities or the Labour Party, but this was partly because of distance some felt toward the cooperative organisation. In addition, there were many internal conflicts. Nonetheless, the effort was made to get past the years of conflict during the Weimar era and the central points of the postwar development from the social democratic position were laid out. These included first of all, to overcome the divisions of the Weimar Republic and the individual organisations began to modify some of their previous positions.

The chairman of the executive committee was Hans Vogel, chairman of Sopade. In addition to various political topics, two program committees developed concepts. Erich Ollenhauer (Sopade) and Wilhelm Heidorn (ISK) led the political committee. Erwin Schoettle (Sopade, Neu Beginnen) and other members led an organisation committee. Each built an important basis for the new organisation of the SPD in the western occupation zones. Other significant members of the Union were Willi Eichler (ISK), Gerhard Gleißberg (Sopade), Richard Löwenthal (Neu Beginnen), Waldemar von Knoeringen (Sopade, Neu Beginnen) and the trade unionist Hans Gottfurcht.

An ideology began to emerge, suppressing Marxism in favor of pluralism; and rejecting the concept of a workers' party, in favor of a Volkspartei, a "People's Party", attractive to all classes of society. In addition, working in cooperation with the Communist Party of Germany was decisively rejected.

After the end of World War II, a large number of the members returned to Germany and the Union lost its impetus. The Union continued its work for a while, led by Wilhelm Sander. The exiled Sopade, Neu Beginnen, SAP and ISK dissolved on 2 December 1945, and on 15 December 1945 formed a new organisation, the Vereinigung deutscher Sozialdemokraten in Großbritannien ("The Society of German Social Democrats in Great Britain"). On 8 December 1945 the London proxy of the SPD was established and three weeks later, on 29 December 1945, there was the first election of the Vereinigung.

== Bibliography ==
- Franz Osterroth / Dieter Schuster, Chronik der deutschen Sozialdemokratie. Bd.II: Vom Beginn der Weimarer Republik bis zum Ende des Zweiten Weltkrieges. Berlin/Bonn (1980) ISBN 3-8012-1084-7 pp. 393-195
