= Walter Reek =

Member of the National Assembly
- In office 1919–1919
- Constituency: West Prussia

Member of the Volkstag
- In office 1920–1927

Mayor of Neuteich
- In office 1925–1933

Member of the Senate of the Free City of Danzig
- In office 1925–1926
- In office 1928–1933

Personal details
- Born: 26 January 1878 Danzig, West Prussia, German Empire (Gdańsk, Poland)
- Died: 12/19 May 1933 (aged 55) Danzig
- Party: Social Democratic Party of Germany; Social Democratic Party of the Free City of Danzig
- Occupation: carpenter

Walter Arthur Reek (26 January 1878 – 12/19 May 1933), was a social democrat politician in Germany and the Free City of Danzig. He was a member of the Weimar National Assembly, the Danzig Volkstag parliament and mayor of Neuteich (Nowy Staw).

Reek was born in Danzig, West Prussia, German Empire (Gdańsk, Poland), and attended the St. Katharinen school in Danzig. He was trained as a carpenter and worked as a wandering journeyman from 1895 to 1900 in Germany, Switzerland and Austria. From 1900 to 1902 he served in the Prussian Army and became the chairman of the Central Federation of carpenters in Danzig in 1902.

During World War I Reek initially served in the German army but started to work in several positions in the Kriegsernährungsamt in Danzig in 1916. In 1917 he headed the press commission of the socialdemocratic Volkswacht newspaper in Danzig. In 1918 he was elected to the town council of Danzig and on 19 January 1919 as a member of the Weimar National Assembly, he lost his seat after Danzig became a Free City according to the Treaty of Versailles.

Since 1919 Reek worked as Secretary of the Allgemeiner Deutscher Gewerkschaftsbund in Danzig. In 1925 he was elected the mayor of Neuteich and in 1925/1926 he was an honorary Senator in Heinrich Sahm's Danzig Senate. From 1928 on he served as Senator in the Senate of Danzig again.

The circumstances of Reek's death are reported in divergent versions. He either died from a stroke or was killed in SA "Schutzhaft" on 12 or 19 May 1933.

His name is remembered at the Memorial to the Murdered Members of the Reichstag in Berlin.
