= Sopade =

Exiled Social Democratic Party of Germany (1933–45)

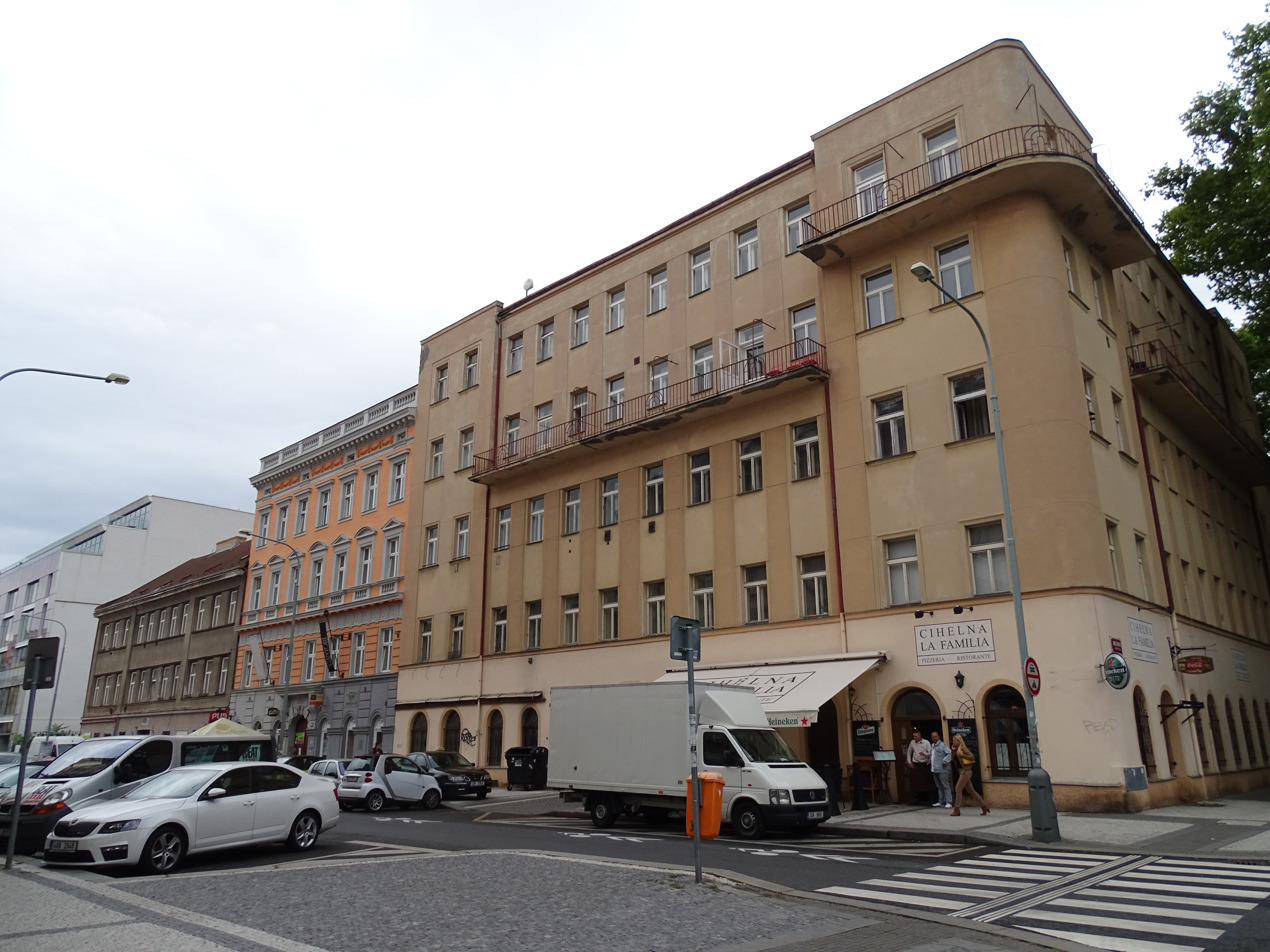
Headquarters of Sopade in Prague-Karlín (1933–1936)

The Social Democratic Party of Germany in Exile, (Note: German: Sozialdemokratische Partei Deutschlands im Exil) commonly known by its German abbreviation Sopade, (Note: German pronunciation: [ˌzopaˈdeː]. Also capitalised SoPaDe or SOPADE.) was the board of directors (Vorstand) of the Social Democratic Party of Germany (SPD) in exile during Nazi rule. It operated in Prague from 1933 to 1938, in Paris from 1938 to 1940, and in London until 1945. Sopade was also used to refer to the organisation's employees and followers.

== History ==
After the occupation of the trade union houses by the Nazis on 2 May 1933, the party executive committee decided that some particularly endangered members of the board would immediately have to flee from the grasp of the Nazis. Otto Wels, Paul Hertz, Friedrich Stampfer, Erich Ollenhauer, and others were assigned to build up a foreign party structure in Prague.

The Sopade broke with the remaining party executive committee in Berlin in mid-May 1933, two weeks after Paul Löbe agreed to Adolf Hitler's peace resolution, which was interpreted as the SPD sanctioning Nazi foreign policy. After the final Nazi prohibition of the SPD on 22 June 1933, there was no longer a divide between the domestic and foreign SPD.

Under pressure from the intra-party opposition groups Neu Beginnen and Revolutionäre Sozialisten Deutschlands, in 1934 the Sopade published the Prague Manifesto, penned by Rudolf Hilferding. This document called for the revolutionary overthrow of the Nazi regime.

With the cooperation of Hilferding, the Sopade published Germany Reports through a secret correspondence system. These dealt with the situation in Nazi Germany. The reports were published under two titles: "Germany Report of the Sopade" from April/May 1934 to December 1936, "Germany Reports of the Social-Democratic Party of Germany (Sopade)" from January 1937 until April 1940. The Reports were published by order of the executive committee in exile of the SPD, edited by Erich Rinner, until March 1938 in Prague, from May 1938 in Paris.

In 1945, the Western members of the Allied Control Council allowed for political parties to be established, including the re-establishment of the SPD.

== Secretaries ==
- Franz Bögler (1902–1976)
- Hans Dill (1887–1973)
- Gustav Ferl (1890–1970)
- Richard Hansen (1887–1976)
- Willy Lange (1899–after 1949)
- Georg Reinbold (1885–1946)
- Erwin Schoettle (1899–1976)
- Ernst Schumacher (1896–1958)
- Emil Stahl (1879–1956)
- Otto Thiele (1896–??)
- Waldemar von Knoeringen (1906–1971)

== See also ==
- Union of German Socialist Organisations in Great Britain

== Bibliography ==
- German Reports of the Sopade. From the copy in the “Archives of Social Democracy” of the Friedrich Ebert Foundation given change and with a register provided by Klaus Behnken in the Petra Netelbeck publishing house, Salzhausen and Zweitausendeins, Frankfurt am Main, 1980 (7 volumes).
