= Neu Beginnen =

German political organization (1929–1936)

Neu Beginnen (English: "[to] begin anew") was a marxist, anti-fascist opposition group formed in 1929 by left-wing members of the Social Democratic Party. After the Nazis seized power in 1933, the members of the small group discussed what the future of Germany should be after the Nazis. The conclusion was a left-wing coalition government consisting of Social Democrats, Socialists and Communists. The leaders of the group saw disunity among the left as one of the key reasons the NSDAP had been able to seize power. They produced illegal pamphlets to advocate their ideas but failed to unite enough anti-fascists to take a significant hold. As a consequence, its loosely organised followers had all either been killed, left the party or been arrested by 1936.

== Members ==
- Evelyn Anderson
- Ilse Barea-Kulcsar
- Richard Löwenthal
- Ira Rischowski
- Reinhard Bendix
- Ossip K. Flechtheim
- Mark Rein
- Edith Jacobson

== See also ==
- Union of German Socialist Organisations in Great Britain
