= Wilhelm Hasenclever =

German politician (1837–1889)

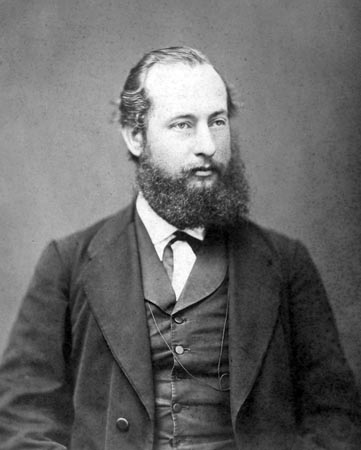
Wilhelm Hasenclever, portrait taken in 1884

Wilhelm Hasenclever (19 April 1837 – 3 July 1889) was a German politician. He was originally a tanner by trade but later became a journalist and author. However, he is most known for his political work in the predecessors of the Social Democratic Party of Germany (SPD).

In 1869 and 1870, Hasenclever was a representative for the General German Workers' Association (Allgemeiner Deutscher Arbeiterverein, ADAV) in the Reichstag (parliament) of the North German Confederation. From 1871 on, he was the last president of the ADAV, until it merged with the Social Democratic Workers' Party (Sozialdemokratische Arbeiterpartei, SDAP) to form the Socialist Workers' Party of Germany (Sozialistische Arbeiterpartei Deutschlands, SAP). From 1874 to 1888 he was again a social democrat representative in the Reichstag of the German Empire that had been formed in 1871: Originally for the ADAV, later for the SAP. Hasenclever was member of the party board there as well.

Together with Wilhelm Liebknecht, he also founded the party paper Vorwärts, the official newspaper of the SPD until the 1890s.

== Life and career ==
Wilhelm Hasenclever was born in Arnsberg, the son of a self-employed tanner. The family had protestant roots and had migrated to the catholic Arnsberg. After visiting secondary school up to the "Sekunda" (equivalent to today's Mittlere Reife, a diploma of secondary education below the full-blown Abitur), he learned the tanning trade from his parents. In 1857/58 he was forced into a year of military service; in 1859, another period of military service with the Prussian army in Düsseldorf and Cologne followed.

In between and afterwards, Hasenclever – like many artisans of the time – took to the road, taking on various short-term jobs and visiting most member states of the North German Confederation, Switzerland, northern Italy and southern France. His experiences, which made him aware of the problems of the proletariat, greatly influenced his later political stance.

=== Early journalistic and political work ===
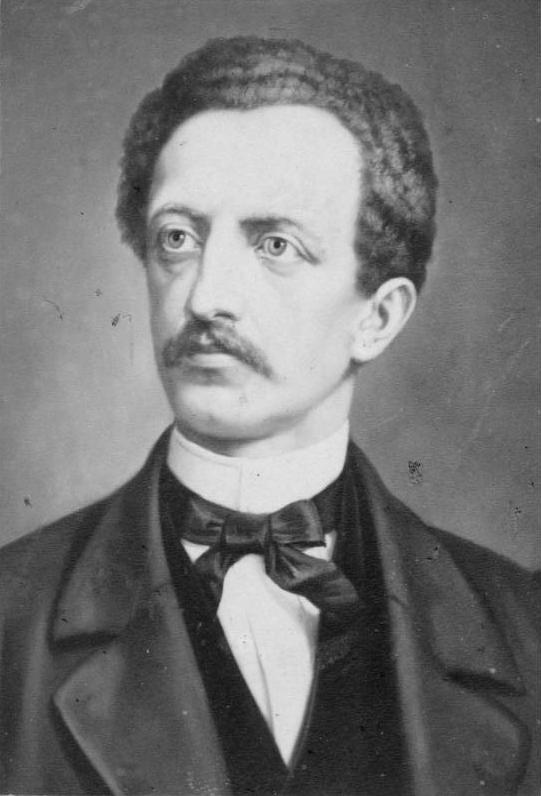
Ferdinand Lassalle (1825–1864), founder of the ADAV

Through work in sports clubs, Hasenclever discovered his love of writing and holding speeches. In 1862/63 he became editor for the democratically oriented newspaper Westfälische Volkszeitung in Hagen. As a journalist, he became aware of the writings of the socialist Ferdinand Lassalle, in particular Lasalle's programme for the working class. This became the foundation of the first German social democrat party, with subgroups in most states of the Confederation: the General German Workers' Association (Allgemeiner Deutscher Arbeiterverein, ADAV), founded on 13 May 1863 in Leipzig and instigated by Lasalle.

During the Second War of Schleswig Hasenclever was once again drafted into the Prussian army for a short time. Shortly after his release he was sentenced to six weeks in prison on grounds of Ehrfuhrchtsverletzung gegenüber Sr. Majestät (Lèse majesté against the Prussian king Wilhelm I) due to an article he had written for the Rheinische Zeitung. However, he was acquitted on appeal.

After these experiences with the Prussian judicial system he joined the ADAV the same year – only a few months after Lasalle had died in a duel.

=== Career in the ADAV, rivalry with the SDAP ===
In 1866 Hasenclever was elected secretary of the ADAV under association president Carl Wilhelm Tölcke. From 1868 to 1870 he was responsible for the party's finances. At the same time, from 1867 to 1869, he ran the tannery in Halver that belonged to his sister.

In 1869 Hasenclever became the representative for Duisburg in the Reichstag (parliament) of the North German Confederation, which had been founded in 1876 after Prussia had won the Austro-Prussian War against Austria. After the election he moved to Berlin. The other ADAV representatives were Friedrich Wilhelm Fritzsche and the anti-Prussian, anti-Marxist Johann Baptist von Schweitzer, who had become president of the ADAV the same year.

Also present in the Reichstag was the Social Democratic Workers' Party (Sozialdemokratische Arbeiterpartei, SDAP), with Wilhelm Liebknecht and August Bebel. The party, which was revolutionary and Marxist, had been formed 1869 in Eisenach, Kingdom of Saxony, from the left wing of the Saxon People's Party (Sächsische Volkspartei). Contrary to the ADAV, the SAP followed a strict anti-Prussian line and worked towards "Großdeutsche" (greater German) unification including Austria and a federal structure, with the goal of constricting the hegemony of Prussia, which was considered reactionary and militaristic by the SAP. That was not only in conflict with the goals of the conservative Prussian president and chancellor of the North German Confederation, Otto von Bismarck, but also with Schweitzer, the controversial leader of the ADAV, who was closer to the chancellor in national matters than the more internationally-oriented SAP. After the previous party treasurer Wilhelm Bracke switched to the rival party, Hasenclever became his successor.

After the end of his first Reichstag period Hasenclever took part in the Franco-Prussian War of 1870/71. After the victory of the North German Confederation under Prussian leadership, the southern German states Baden, Württemberg and Bavaria joined the Confederation, forming the German Empire with the King of Prussia, Wilhelm I, as Kaiser (Emperor). So, the "Kleindeutsche" (smaller German) solution had been implemented. Bismarck became Reichskanzler and leader of the government that had been specified by the Emperor.

Shortly afterwards, secret communication between the government and Schweitzer (who was known in the ADAV as an authoritarian, bordering on the dictatorial, leader) became known. Schweitzer stepped down as party leader and ended his political career. In 1871, Hasenclever was elected Schweitzer's successor as the president of the ADAV.

In the following years, Bismarck tried to play SDAP and ADAV (both of which he regarded as "enemies of the Reich") against each other. The rivalry between the two parties made it easier for the government to harass worker's associations in the whole Reich with raids and searches.

As newly elected president of the ADAV, Hasenclever began to give a new direction to the ADAV. That, combined with Bismarck's increasingly restrictive line, led to a party line closer to that of the SDAP. However both parties kept their priorities for the time being and criticized each other for it: reform (ADAV) versus revolution (SDAP), national influence of the worker's movement (ADAV) against proletarian internationalism (SDAP), working towards cooperatives (ADAV) versus working towards trade unions (SDAP).

The two papers of the ADAV – Der Social-Demokrat ("The Social Democrat") and Der Agitator ("The Agitator"), both dominated by Schweitzer until he stepped down – now were merged into a new party publication called Der Neue Sozial-Demokrat ("The New Social Democrat"). Editors-in-chief were Hasenclever and his party friend and supporter Wilhelm Hasselmann. Additionally, Hasenclever was editor for the magazine Sozial-politische Blätter ("Socio-Political Papers") and, from 1873 onwards, publisher of the special edition Sozialpolitische Blätter zur Unterhaltung und Belehrung der deutschen Arbeiter ("Socio-Political Papers for the Entertainment and Education of the German Workers").

Under Hasenclever's leadership the ADAV grew from 5300 (1871) to more than 19000 (1873/74) members. Der Neue Sozial-Demokrat had more than 11000 subscribers. For his publications, Hasenclever got multiple criminal sentences, up to one to three months of prison, for crimes such as "publicly encouraging criminal acts", "libel" and "membership in a closed society".

=== Fusion of the ADAV and the SDAP – the SAP ===
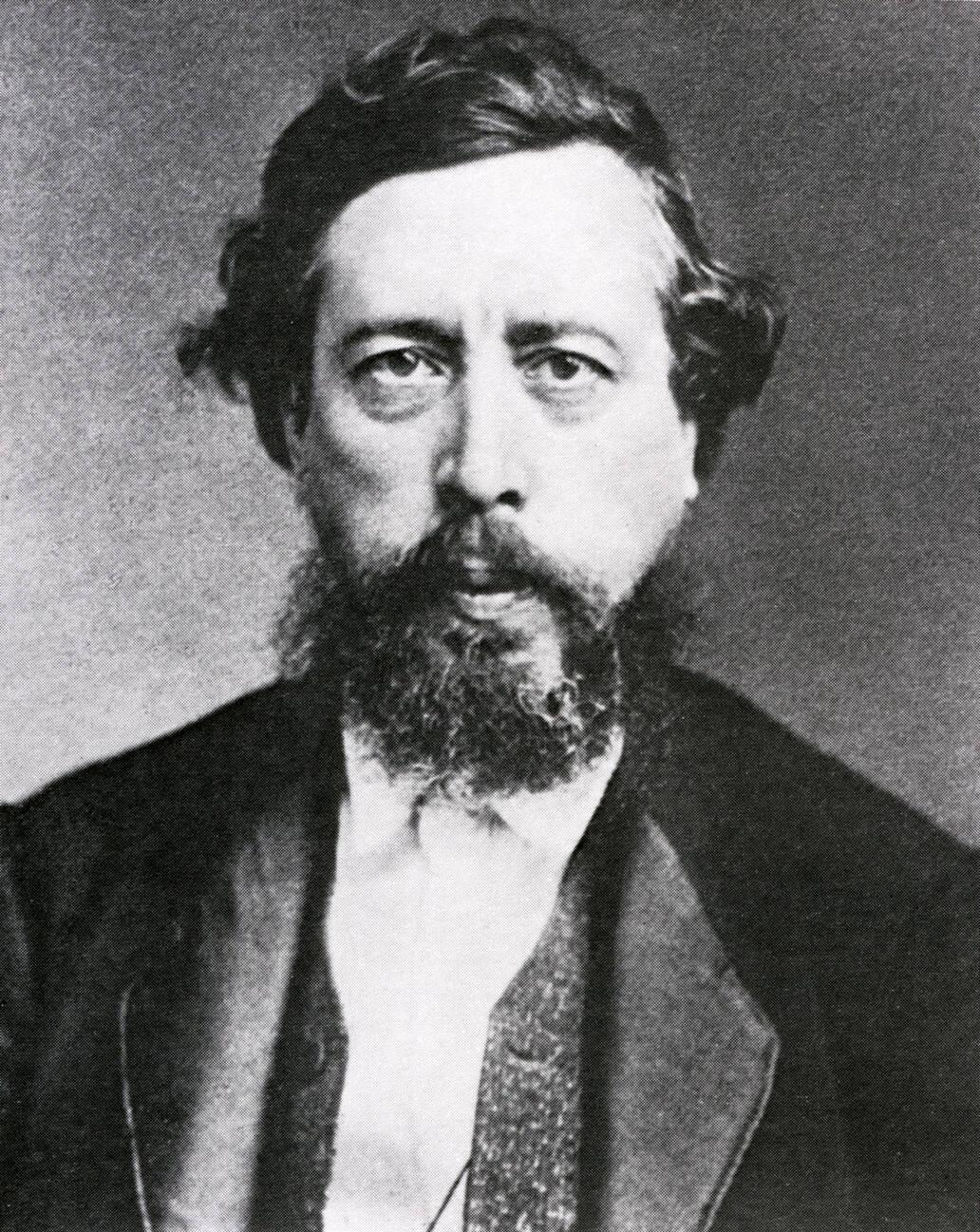
Wilhelm Liebknecht (1826–1900)

After a hiatus of four years, Hasenclever was once again elected to the Reichstag (which had become the Reichstag of the German Empire), this time representing Altona. Since then, the positions of the ADAV and the SDAP increasingly converged. On a joint party meeting on 5 May 1875 in Gotha, the two parties finally merged, forming the Socialist Workers' Party of Germany (Sozialistische Arbeiterpartei Deutschlands, SAP).

Hasenclever and Wilhelm Liebknecht, the leaders of the two parties, had struck a compromise that was written down in the Gotha programme (Gothaer Programm) of the SAP. It included toning down the revolutionary goals of the SDAP to work within legal bounds:

... erstrebt die sozialistische Arbeiterpartei Deutschlands mit allen gesetzlichen Mitteln den freien Staat und die sozialistische Gesellschaft ...
( ...the Socialist Worker's Party of works towards the free state and the socialist society using all legal means ...)

Additionally, these goals should be reached primarily on a national level, which weakened the internationalist aspect of social democrat politics. The party programme was also much more insistent on furthering cooperative economics than the previous programme of the SDAP.

While the Marxist goals of Liebknecht were not gone entirely, Karl Marx himself criticized the more reform-oriented compromise in his Kritik des Gothaer Programms ("Critique of the Gotha Programme") from his exile in London.

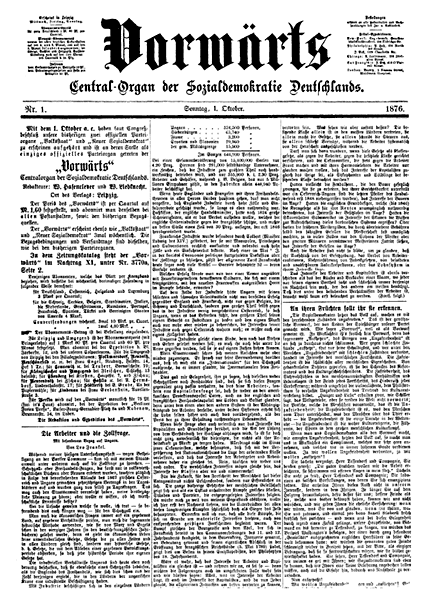
Front page of the first (1 October 1876) issue of Vorwärts

Hasenclever was on the board of the new SAP in 1975/76 together with Liebknecht and August Bebel. Together with Liebknecht, he founded the new central party publication Vorwärts ("Forward") 1876 in Leipzig. The first issue was published on 1 October 1876. Vorwärts is still the official publication of the SAP's successor party, the SPD.

The same year, Hasenclever moved to Hamburg and founded the Hamburg-Altonaer Volksblatt ("Hamburg-Altona People's Paper") . Additionally, he published a satirical worker's newspaper in Leipzig.

=== Work in the Reichstag and the anti-socialist laws ===
Because of the steady increase of support for the social democrats, Bismarck tried to suppress the party and related associations more firmly. Two assassination attempts on Kaiser Wilhelm I in May and June 1878 gave him the opportunity to act. Even though there was no evidence to support the charge, he accused the SAP of responsibility for the attempts.

After the Conservative and National Liberal representatives in the Reichstag voted unanimously in favor of it, Bismarck submitted the Gesetz gegen die gemeingefährlichen Bestrebungen der Sozialdemokratie ("Law against the public danger of social democratic endeavours", known today as the Sozialistengesetz in German and "Anti-Socialist Laws" in English) for the Kaiser to sign. It prohibited all activities, meetings and publications "aim[ed] at the overthrow of the existing political or social order through social-democratic, socialist or communist endeavors". It did not, however, affect the parliamentary immunity of members of the Reichstag and the Landtage (state parliaments). It went into effect on 22 October 1878 and was rescinded in 1890 – one year after Hasenclever's death and shortly after Bismarck had been relieved of his post as chancellor by the new Kaiser, Wilhelm II.

The Vorwärts newspaper was prohibited in this time as well. Der Sozialdemokrat was one of the few party papers that was distributed illegally in the Reich. It was printed in Zurich beginning in 1880 and in London from 1887. Many Social Democrats were forced to emigrate to neighboring countries, others were jailed for breaching the anti-socialist laws or were expelled from the towns they were living in as "agitators". When the government declared the so-called Kleiner Belagerungszustand (minor state of siege) in several cities that were Social Democrat strongholds, these sanctions further increased.

Hasenclever, Liebknecht, Bebel and other SAP party members kept their seats in the Reichstag and continued to oppose Bismarck's politics and the parties that supported him. However, they were not allowed to publicly represent Social Democracy within the Reich's borders outside the Reichstag. Even with these heavy sanctions, they held their seats in the next Reichstag election, in which the SAP continued to gain additional votes. Against Bismarck's intentions, the anti-socialist laws had led to a surge of solidarity in the working class that politicized the workers and moved them closer to the party.

Between 1881 and 1890 the number of Reichstag votes for the SAP rose from 312,000 in 1881 to more than 1.4 Million in 1890, an increase of more than 450%. That made the SAP the party with the highest number of votes in the Reich. Bismarck's social laws, which created the basis for a system of social security and were intended to win voters away from the workers' movement, failed to stop the trend.

Like many socialists, Hasenclever was active with the trade unions during the anti-socialist laws, independent of his party membership. For example, after 1878 he co-founded the Berliner Arbeiterbund ("Berlin Worker's Association"). His publications were partially written under a pen name.

Even though he had a seat in the Reichstag, he was forced to change his German place of residence multiple times by the Kleiner Belagerungszustand, since he was expelled from Leipzig in 1881 and from Berlin in 1884. He lived as a self-employed writer in Wurzen, Halle and Dessau. Because he was mostly unable to finance his political work by himself, he had to rely on support by his wife Clara, which owned a cigar trade in Berlin.

=== Illness and death ===
In the late 1880s Hasenclever increasingly suffered from a neurological and psychiatrical condition that was not specifically diagnosed at the time. This made his political work harder and harder, and in the end impossible. In 1888 he stepped down from the Reichstag, after he had collapsed during the Geheimbund-Prozess ("secret society trial") in Düsseldorf. He tried to regain his health in the Maison de la santé (French for "house of health"), a sanatorium in Schöneberg south of Berlin. There he died, reliant on support by staff and mentally incapable, on 3 July 1889, aged 52. He did not experience the end of the anti-socialist laws and the renaming of the SAP to Social Democratic Party of Germany (Sozialdemokratische Partei Deutschlands, SPD) a year later.

He was buried on the Friedhof der freireligiösen Gemeinde Berlins ("Cemetery of the independently religious community of Berlin") on Prenzlauer Berg in Pankow. About 15000 workers attended the funeral.

A year later, in 1890, party members of the SPD collected money for a memorial there. Its inscription is "Dem alten Kämpfer für Wahrheit, Freiheit und Recht" ("To the old fighter for truth, freedom and justice"). Today, the Wilhelm-Hasenclever-Platz, a square in Berlin-Wedding which features another memorial plaque, is named in his honor. Also, a street in Treptow is named after him. In 1987, Hasenclever's house of birth in Arnsberg was fitted with a memorial plaque as well.

== Work as a writer ==
Hasenclever's work as a writer went beyond the numerous publications in newspapers and magazines, many of which he had founded himself. He wrote various treatises on sociopolitical problems of the time, but also novellas, poems and songs, in which he addressed the cause of the workers in emotionally and full of pathos. The roots of his poems were the political poems of the Vormärz and were intended to be more political than artistical. In day-to-day politics, however, Hasenclever was regarded as more moderate than other leading Socialists of the time.

Inside the party, one of his most controversial works was the treatise "Der Wahrheit die Ehre. Ein Beitrag zur Judenfrage in Deutschland" ("Truth Honored. A Submission on the Question of Jews in Germany"), which he had published in 1881 under the pen name "Wilhelm Revel". In it, Hasenclever addressed the racist-antisemitic position of Adolf Stoecker, who had founded the Christian Social Party (Christlich-soziale Partei) to promote an anti-Semitic agenda politically. However, by criticizing this "movement", which tried to attract and subvert the social democrat voters (with limited success), Hasenclever touched upon the anti-Semitic ressentiments in the worker's movement and showed understanding for their anti-capitalist and anti-intellectual motivations. So, he showed his own latent antisemitical bias, which led to criticism by other leading party members, who saw it as a threat to the official party line of emancipation and assimilation of Jews.

== Partial bibliography ==
- Über die Beeinflussung des Arbeiterstandes durch die gegenwärtige Presse ("On the Influence of the Current Press on the Working Class"), Heidelberg 1864.
- Erlebtes – Skizzen und Novellen ("Experiences – Sketches and Novellas"), Leipzig 1877.
- Erlebtes. Erinnerungen aus dem Soldatenleben 1857 bis 1871 ("Experiences. Recollections of Life as a Soldier 1857 to 1871"), Leipzig 1877.
- Liebe, Leben, Kampf. Gedichte ("Love, Life, Struggle. Poems."), Hamburg 1878.
- Noch einmal Herr Findel und die Socialdemokratie ("Once Again Mister Findel and Social Democracy"), Leipzig 1880.
- Der Wahrheit die Ehre. Ein Beitrag zur Judenfrage in Deutschland ("Truth Honored. A Submission on the Question of Jews in Germany"), Nuremberg 1881 (published under the pen name Wilhelm Revel).
- Eduard Bernstein: Die Geschichte der Berliner Arbeiterbewegung.. Berlin 1907. (in German)
- Franz Mehring: Die Geschichte der deutschen Sozialdemokratie. Dietz, Berlin 1898, 1980. (in German)
- Ludger Heid, Klaus-Dieter Vinschen, Elisabeth Heid (publishers): Wilhelm Hasenclever. Reden und Schriften. Dietz, Bonn 1989. ISBN 3-8012-1130-4 (in German)
- Georg Eckert (publisher): Wilhelm Liebknecht. Briefwechsel mit deutschen Sozialdemokraten. 1862 bis 1878. Vol. 1. Assen 1973. ISBN 90-232-0858-7 (in German)
- Ludger Heid: "Pazifist – Patriot – Parlamentarier. Wilhelm Hasenclever in der antimilitaristischen Tradition der deutschen Arbeiterbewegung". In: Wilhelm Hasenclever. Erlebtes., published by Ludger Heid and others. F. Franke, Arnsberg 1987. (in German)
- Anne Roerkohl: Wilhelm Hasenclever. Westfalen im Bild. Bildmediensammlung zur westfäl. Landeskunde. Persönlichkeiten aus Westfalen. Volume 3. Münster 1991. (in German)
