= Vorwärts =

Party newspaper from Germany

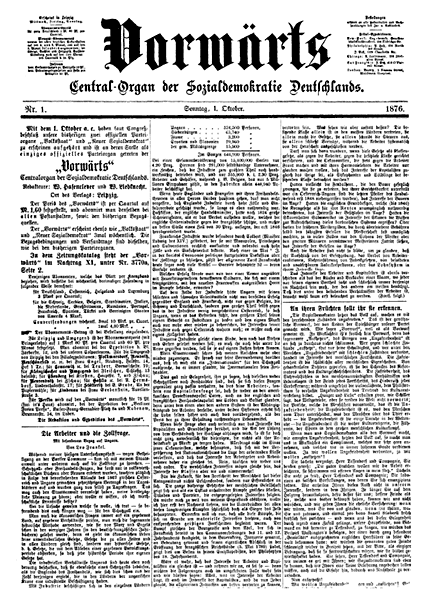
- Front page of the first issue (1 October 1876) of Vorwärts
- Owner(s): Social Democratic Party of Germany
- Founded: 1876; 149 years ago
- Political alignment: Social democracy
- Country: Germany
- Circulation: 360,000 (as of 2020)
- ISSN: 0042-8949
- Website: vorwaerts.de

Vorwärts (German: [ˈfoːɐ̯vɛʁts] or [ˈfɔʁvɛʁts]; "Forward") is a newspaper published by the Social Democratic Party of Germany (SPD). Founded in 1876, it was the central organ of the SPD for many decades. Following the party's Halle Congress (1891), it was published daily as the successor of Berliner Volksblatt, founded in 1884. Today, it is published every two months, mailed to all SPD members.

== History ==
The paper was founded as a merger of the Eisenacher's Der Volksstaat and the Lasalleans Der Sozialdemokrat (General German Workers' Association). Its first editors were Wilhelm Hasenclever and Wilhelm Liebknecht.

Friedrich Engels and Kurt Tucholsky both wrote for Vorwärts. It backed the Russian Marxist economists and then, after the split in the Party, the Mensheviks. It published articles by Leon Trotsky, but would not publish any by Vladimir Lenin.

During the First World War, Vorwärts remained in favour of pacifism and neutrality and opposed the SPD's Burgfriedenspolitik until 1916 when, sometime after Rudolf Hilferding had been drafted into the Austrian army, Friedrich Stampfer was introduced as editor-in-chief. He guided the central organ back towards the party line (prompting accusations from half of the Socialist camp that it had become chauvinist).

The paper was staunchly opposed to the October Revolution, standing up for the attempt to bring parliamentarism to Germany.

In 1923, Vorwärts lost a libel trial brought by Adolf Hitler, and was ordered to pay him 6,000,000 marks. The paper had claimed Hitler was financed by "American Jews and Henry Ford."

During the Nazi period, the Social Democratic Party of Germany was banned, and so the publication of Vorwärts in Germany had to stop in 1933, but it was continued in exile in Czechoslovakia until 1938 and subsequently in Paris until 1940.

In 1948, the paper was refounded as Neuer Vorwärts ("New Forward") and in 1955 renamed Vorwärts again. As of 2020, it has a circulation of about 360,000 every two months, because it is mailed to all SPD members.

== See also ==
- Wisconsin Vorwärts (Wisconsin Forward)
