= Wilhelm Liebknecht =

German social democratic politician (1826–1900)

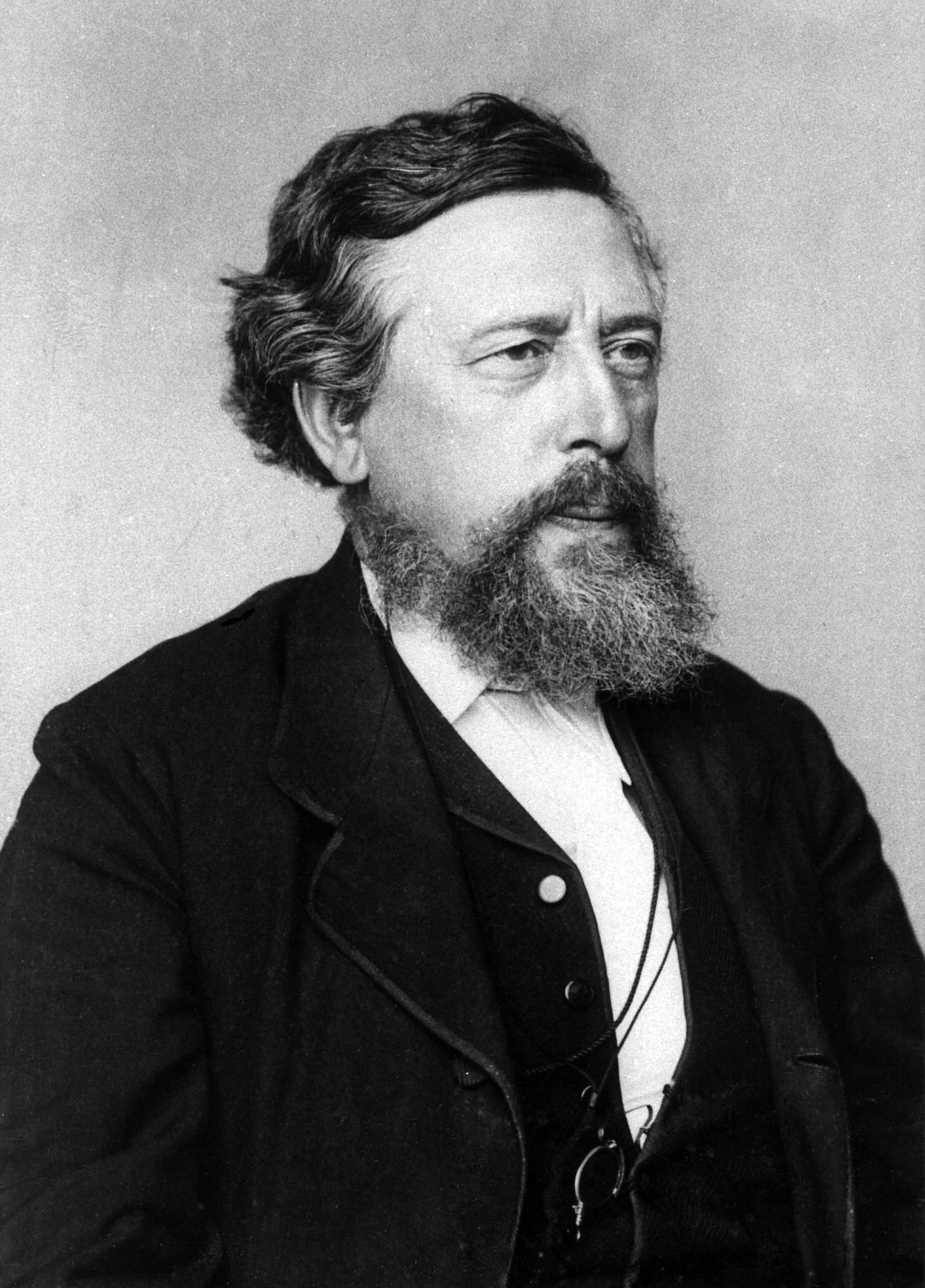
- Liebknecht in 1885

Member of the Reichstag
- In office 10 January 1874 – 7 August 1900
- Preceded by: Eduard Minckwitz
- Succeeded by: Georg Ledebour
- Constituency: Saxony 19 (1874–1881); Hesse 5 (1881–1888); Berlin 6 (1888–1900)

Member of the North German Reichstag
- In office 31 August 1867 – 18 January 1871

Member of the Landtag of Saxony
- In office 1889–1892
- In office 1879–1885

Personal details
- Born: Wilhelm Martin Philipp Christian Ludwig Liebknecht; 29 March 1826 Giessen, Grand Duchy of Hesse
- Died: 7 August 1900 (aged 74) Charlottenburg, Berlin, Prussia, German Empire
- Party: Communist League; ADAV; Saxon People's Party; SDAP; SPD
- Children: Theodor; Karl
- Occupation: Politician, journalist

Wilhelm Martin Philipp Christian Ludwig Liebknecht (German: [ˈvɪlhɛlm ˈliːpknɛçt]; 29 March 1826 – 7 August 1900) was a German social democratic politician and journalist. A principal founder of the Social Democratic Party of Germany (SPD), his political career was a pioneering project in steering a Marxist-inspired workers' party to electoral success and mass membership. Liebknecht served as a member of the North German Reichstag from 1867 to 1871, and of the German Reichstag from 1874 until his death in 1900.

Born in Giessen, Liebknecht was radicalized as a student and became an active participant in the 1848 Revolutions. After the defeat of the uprisings, he spent thirteen years in exile, first in Switzerland and then in London. In London, he became a close associate and student of Karl Marx and Friedrich Engels. After returning to Germany in 1862, he co-founded the Social Democratic Workers' Party of Germany (SDAP) in 1869 with his long-time political collaborator August Bebel. The party, known as the "Eisenachers", was established as a mass-based political party committed to a Marxist program.

Liebknecht was a prominent opponent of the Franco-Prussian War. His refusal to vote for war credits and his outspoken criticism of the annexation of Alsace–Lorraine led to his arrest and a two-year prison sentence for treason in 1872. He was the main architect of the 1875 Gotha unity congress, which merged the SDAP with the Lassallean General German Workers' Association to form the party that would become the SPD. During the period of the Anti-Socialist Laws from 1878 to 1890, he used his position in the Reichstag to maintain the party's public voice and was instrumental in guiding it through the years of persecution.

As a leader of the largest socialist party in Europe, Liebknecht was a major figure in the Second International, which he helped found in 1889. He served as the editor-in-chief of the SPD's central organ, Vorwärts, and became an elder statesman of the party, defending orthodox Marxism against the rise of revisionism in his later years. A committed democrat, he advocated for a socialist republic achieved through parliamentary means. His son, Karl Liebknecht, also became a prominent socialist leader.

== Early life and radicalization ==
Wilhelm Liebknecht was born on 29 March 1826 in Giessen, Grand Duchy of Hesse. His father was Ludwig Christian Liebknecht, a government official, and his mother was Catharina, née Hirsch. His lineage included a line of university-educated public servants; his great-grandfather, Johann Georg Liebknecht, had been a professor of mathematics and theology at the University of Giessen.

His childhood was marked by tragedy. His mother died in October 1831 when he was five, and his father died fourteen months later. Orphaned, Wilhelm and his three siblings moved in with their seventy-two-year-old paternal grandmother, but she died in May 1834. From the age of eight, Liebknecht was raised by his guardian, Karl Osswald, a theologian who had been a friend of his father. Liebknecht recalled his childhood as "somewhat too strict and too far removed from the pleasures of youth". A formative influence on the young Liebknecht was the fate of his maternal great-uncle, the pastor Friedrich Ludwig Weidig. Weidig was a leading figure in the revolutionary democratic underground in Hesse in the 1830s who was arrested, tortured, and died in prison in 1837. Liebknecht later stated that Weidig's death made a "deep, perhaps a decisive impression" on him.

Despite the family's financial difficulties, Liebknecht's inheritance was sufficient for him to pursue a university education. He graduated first in his class from the Gymnasium in Giessen in 1842. He went on to study philology, theology, and philosophy at the universities of Giessen, Berlin, and Marburg. It was during his time as a student that his political radicalization began. In Berlin, he was exposed to the writings of utopian socialists like Henri de Saint-Simon, as well as the materialist philosophy of Ludwig Feuerbach and the critical theology of David Strauss. He became a "conscious socialist" after reading Friedrich Engels's The Condition of the Working Class in England, which, he later recalled, "opened a new world to me".

Liebknecht became active in student radicalism, joining the "Allemania" student corps at Giessen. In August 1846, he played a major role in organizing a student strike, in which the entire student body marched out of town and camped on a nearby hill in protest against the university senate. The strike ultimately succeeded, but Liebknecht, fearing reprisals, moved to the University of Marburg. His political activities continued to draw the attention of the authorities. In the summer of 1847, after participating in a late-night demonstration in solidarity with the political prisoner Sylvester Jordan, Liebknecht was warned of his impending arrest and fled Germany for a planned emigration to the United States.

== Revolution and exile ==
=== 1848 Revolutions ===
While travelling to a port for his journey to America, Liebknecht had a chance encounter on a train with the headmaster of a progressive school in Zurich, Switzerland. The headmaster, an associate of the revolutionary Julius Fröbel, offered him a position as a volunteer teacher at the school. Liebknecht accepted, abandoning his plans for America and arriving in Zurich in July 1847. He soon became a correspondent for the left-leaning newspaper Mannheimer Abendzeitung and reported on the Sonderbund War, a civil war that led to the establishment of a liberal federal state in Switzerland.

When the February Revolution of 1848 broke out in Paris, Liebknecht hurried to the city to join the German exiles. He became a member of the German Legion, led by the revolutionary poet Georg Herwegh, which planned an armed expedition to start a republican uprising in Germany. The legion was defeated in southern Baden in April. Liebknecht, who had been ill, arrived too late to join the fighting.

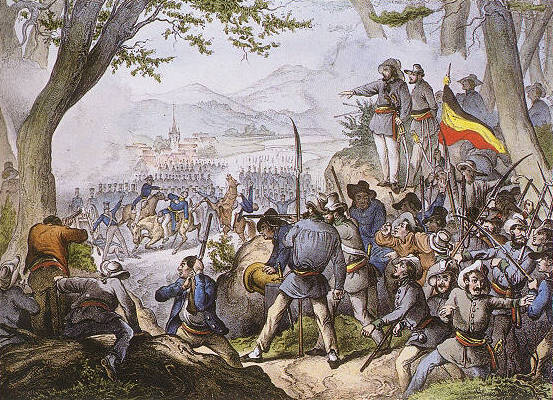
Depiction of a battle during the Baden Revolution of 1848–1849

After the defeat of Herwegh's Legion, Liebknecht remained active in the democratic movement. He joined the second republican uprising in Baden, led by Gustav Struve, in September 1848. Liebknecht was dispatched to organize recruits in the countryside. Shortly after the uprising was defeated at the Battle of Staufen, Liebknecht was arrested. He spent the next eight months in prison in Freiburg, awaiting trial for high treason. It was during his imprisonment that he met his future wife, Ernestine Landolt, the daughter of the prison pastor. On 12 May 1849, as his trial was about to begin, a military mutiny in Baden sparked the third and final uprising of the Baden Revolution. The rebels freed the political prisoners, and Liebknecht's charges were dismissed. He joined the revolutionary government and fought in its army during the Campaign for the Imperial Constitution, serving as an adjutant to Gustav Struve. After the final defeat of the uprising by Prussian troops in July 1849, Liebknecht fled across the border into France and then to Switzerland.

=== Exile in Switzerland and London ===
Liebknecht settled in Geneva, where a radical government directed the affairs of the canton. He became a prominent figure in the German Workers' Educational Union in the city. In a public debate, he successfully argued for a class-conscious social democratic orientation against the liberal position of his opponents, and the members elected him as their president. He then worked to build a national organization of German workers' associations in Switzerland. In February 1850, as he travelled to a congress of these associations in Murten, he was arrested by Swiss authorities. The Swiss government, under pressure from Prussia and other German states, accused Liebknecht's organization of planning an armed invasion of Germany and ordered his expulsion.

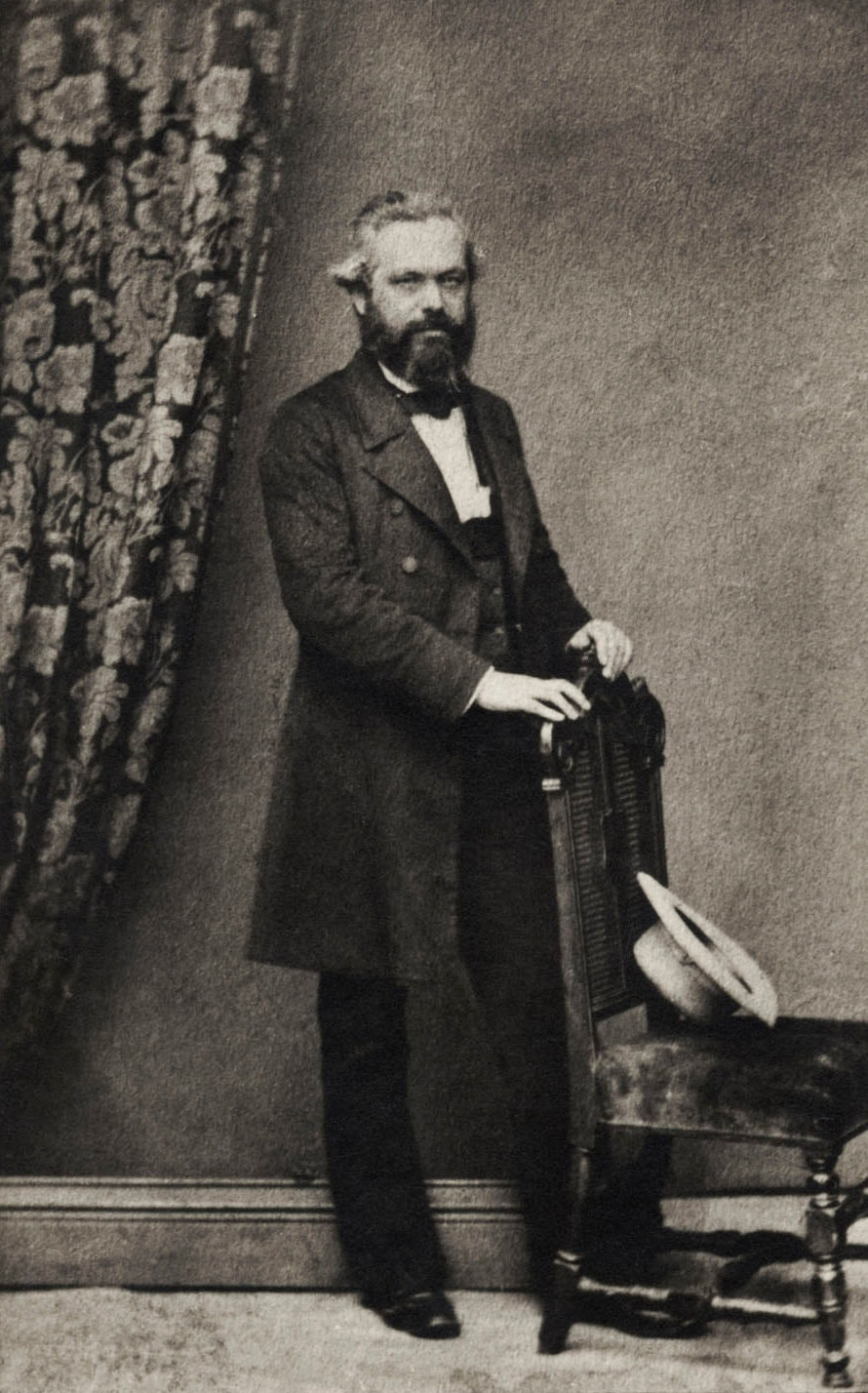
Karl Marx

In mid-May 1850, Liebknecht arrived in London, where he would remain in exile for the next twelve years. He lived in poverty in the Soho district, an area with a large immigrant population, supporting himself with journalistic work and language lessons. Soon after his arrival, at a summer picnic of the Communist Laborer's Educational Club, he met Karl Marx. He became a member of the Communist League and a close associate of Marx and Friedrich Engels. Liebknecht's relationship with Marx was that of a "pupil", and he later wrote that Marx became his "teacher in the narrower and wider sense of the word; I was his friend and confidant". In 1859, he was a founder and editor of the German-language newspaper Das Volk, which served as a public organ for the London exiles and received contributions from Marx and Engels. He married Ernestine Landolt in 1854. The couple had two daughters, Alice and Gertrude. Ernestine died from tuberculosis in 1867.

== Political career in Germany ==
=== Return and founding of the SDAP ===
In 1862, after a Prussian amnesty for political offenders of 1848, Liebknecht returned to Germany. He initially worked for the Norddeutsche Allgemeine Zeitung in Berlin, but he resigned when he discovered that the paper was being influenced by the government of Otto von Bismarck. His opposition to Bismarck's policies continued throughout his career. In 1863, he joined the newly founded General German Workers' Association (ADAV) of Ferdinand Lassalle. Liebknecht quickly became a leading internal critic of Lassalle's policies, particularly his pro-Prussian stance on German unification and his dictatorial leadership style.

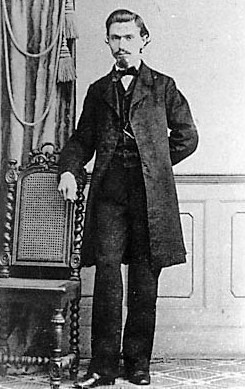
August Bebel in 1863

In 1865, Liebknecht was expelled from Prussia and moved to Leipzig in the Kingdom of Saxony. There he met the young turner August Bebel. The two men became close friends and political allies, with the more theoretically grounded Liebknecht providing ideas while Bebel provided organizational talent. Bebel, in his memoirs, described Liebknecht as "a man of extremes", a "tempestuous, tireless propagandist" whose boundless enthusiasm was channeled by Bebel's more pragmatic leadership. They worked within the Federation of German Workers' Associations (VDAV) and the left-liberal Saxon People's Party to build an anti-Prussian, socialist movement. In a key 1869 speech, Liebknecht argued against parliamentary participation for its own sake, viewing the Reichstag as a mere "fig-leaf of absolutism", but he encouraged participation in elections as a tool for agitation. At the VDAV congress in Nuremberg in 1868, they successfully persuaded the organization to adopt the program of the First International.

In 1869, Liebknecht and Bebel co-founded the Social Democratic Workers' Party of Germany (SDAP) at a congress in Eisenach. The party, known as the "Eisenachers", was formed by members of the VDAV and dissenting members of the ADAV who had rebelled against the dictatorial leadership of Lassalle's successor, Johann Baptist von Schweitzer. The call for the unity congress was published in Liebknecht's newspaper, the Demokratische Wochenblatt. The Eisenach Program, largely drafted by Liebknecht, declared the party a section of the First International and established a democratic organizational structure.

=== Opposition to Franco-Prussian War and treason trial ===
Liebknecht was one of the most prominent socialist opponents of the Franco-Prussian War (1870–1871). In the Reichstag of the North German Confederation, after some brief initial hesitation, he and Bebel were the only members to abstain from the vote on war credits, declaring their opposition to a dynastic war fought by monarchical governments. After the defeat of Napoleon III at the Battle of Sedan, they voted against further war credits and spoke out against the annexation of Alsace–Lorraine. Their uncompromising stance led to their arrest for treason in December 1870. Liebknecht greeted the unification of Germany under Prussian leadership in 1871 with the slogan: "For this system, not one man and not one penny!" (Diesem System keinen Mann und keinen Groschen!), a phrase that became a watchword of the party's opposition to the Bismarckian state.

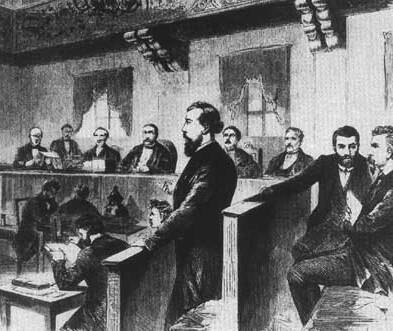
Depiction of Liebknecht at the Leipzig Treason Trial in 1872

The Leipzig Treason Trial of Liebknecht, Bebel, and Adolf Hepner took place in March 1872. The trial gave Liebknecht a national platform to expound his socialist and anti-Prussian views. During the trial, he famously declared: "I am not a professional conspirator; I am not a knight-errant of subversion. But I should have no objection to your terming me a soldier of the revolution." This declaration earned him the party nickname der Soldat (the soldier). The defendants were found guilty of "conspiracy to commit high treason" and sentenced to two years in a fortress. The trial was a major propaganda success for the SDAP, winning sympathy for the socialists and bringing prominent figures like Johann Jacoby into the party.

=== Gotha unity congress and the Anti-Socialist Laws ===
While Liebknecht and Bebel were in prison, the pressures for a merger between the SDAP and the Lassallean ADAV intensified. After his release in 1874, Liebknecht became the principal architect of the unification. The unity congress was held in Gotha in May 1875. Liebknecht was the main author of the Gotha Program, which brought the two factions together into the unified Socialist Workers' Party of Germany (SAP). The program was a compromise, incorporating Lassallean ideas such as state aid for producers' cooperatives and the "iron law of wages". Liebknecht, however, successfully added a stronger commitment to working-class internationalism than was in the original draft. The program was sharply criticized by Karl Marx in his Critique of the Gotha Program. Liebknecht defended the merger, arguing that achieving party unity was of paramount importance. For him, the adoption of a democratic party organization, which ended the Lassallean dictatorial structure, was a more decisive victory than any programmatic concession.

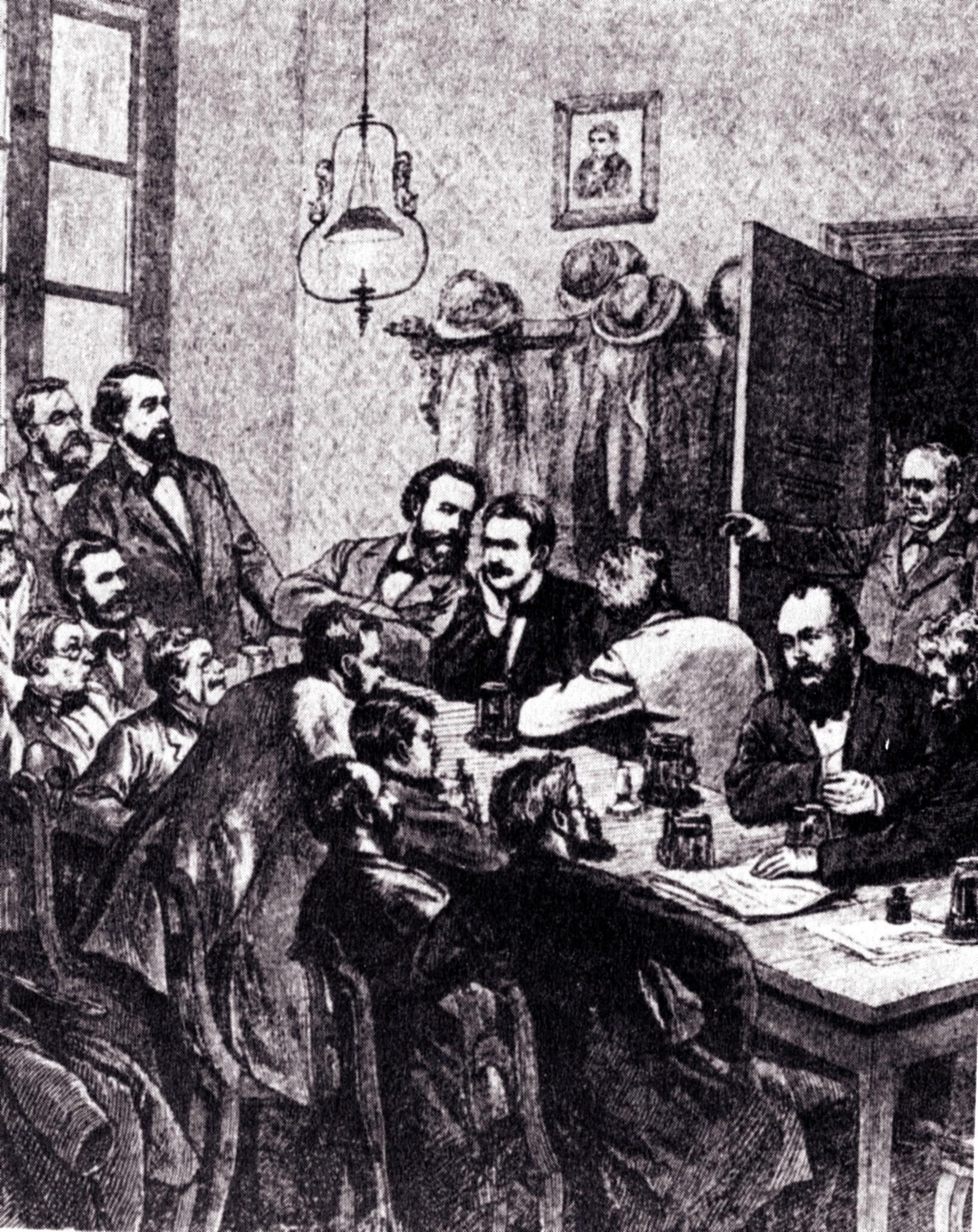
Depiction of the dissolution of a SAP assembly in Leipzig under the Anti-Socialist Laws, 1881. Liebknecht is standing, second from the left.

In 1878, Bismarck used two assassination attempts on Kaiser Wilhelm I as a pretext to introduce the Anti-Socialist Laws, which effectively outlawed the SAP. The law banned all socialist organizations and publications, and subjected socialists to police harassment and deportation. The party leadership, including Liebknecht, initially responded by officially dissolving the party. However, the party continued to operate underground, and Liebknecht used his position as a Reichstag deputy—a position which granted him immunity from prosecution—to maintain the party's structure and voice. In a Reichstag speech, he declared, "Freedom has been outlawed together with us ... the sacrifice of freedom will be made. Let the responsibility for this step fall upon them who are performing it." In 1879, he helped establish the party's clandestine organ, Der Sozialdemokrat, published in Zurich and smuggled into Germany.

During the period of the Anti-Socialist Laws, the party faced internal divisions. A radical, anarchist-leaning faction led by Johann Most advocated for a turn to violent revolution. At the same time, a moderate tendency emerged that favored a more reformist course. Liebknecht, along with Bebel, successfully navigated these conflicts. At the secret party congress in Wyden, Switzerland, in 1880, Most was expelled from the party. Throughout the 1880s, Liebknecht played the role of a conciliator, working to hold the party together and prevent a schism between its radical and moderate wings.

=== Later years and the Second International ===
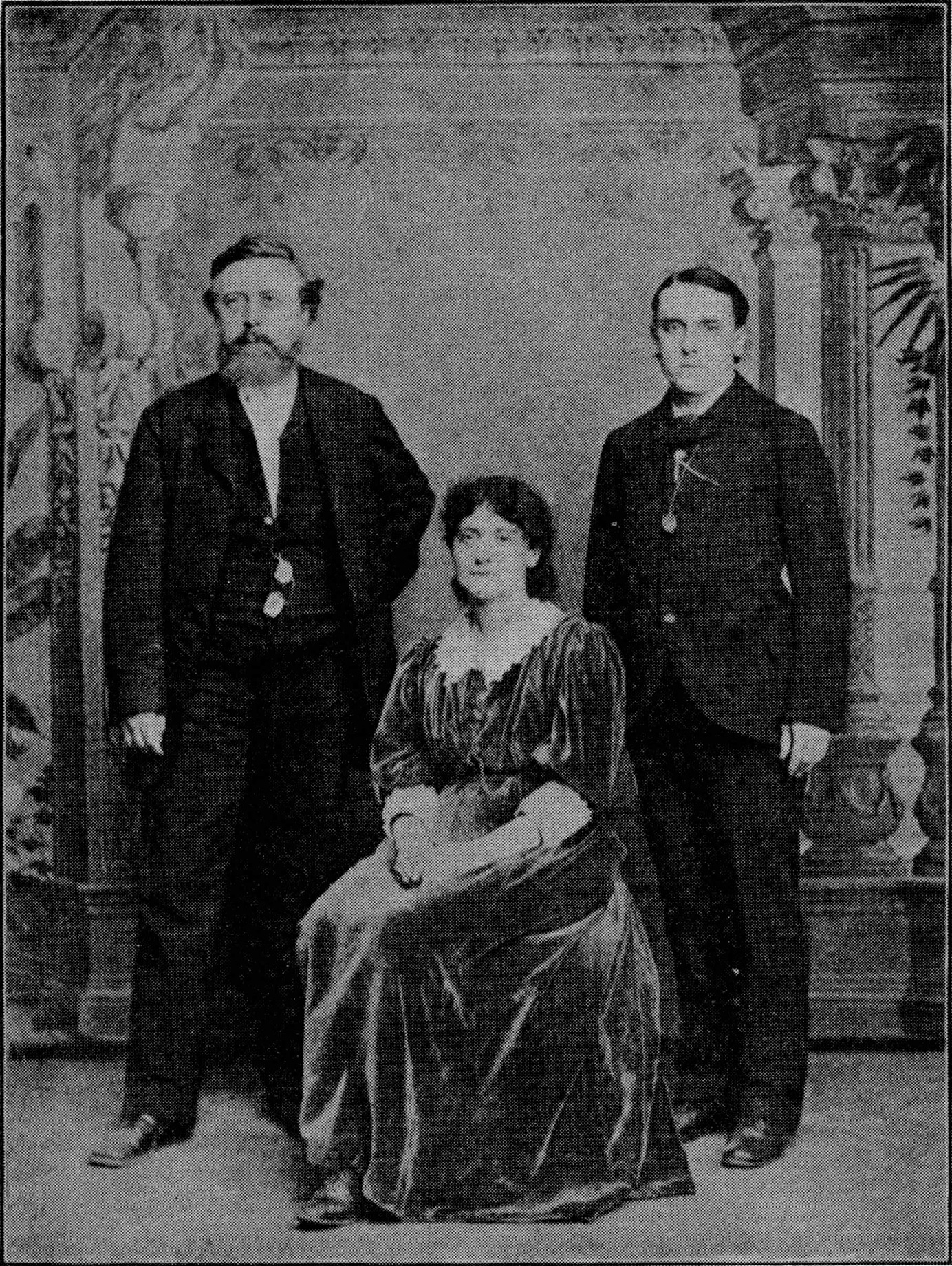
Liebknecht (left) with Eleanor Marx and Edward Aveling in New York, 1886

In 1886, Liebknecht embarked on an extended agitational tour of the United States with Eleanor Marx and Edward Aveling to raise funds for the SAP. His visit coincided with the aftermath of the Haymarket affair, and he defended the condemned anarchists as victims of class justice while simultaneously repudiating anarchist tactics. The tour was a success, with large, enthusiastic crowds at his speeches across the country.

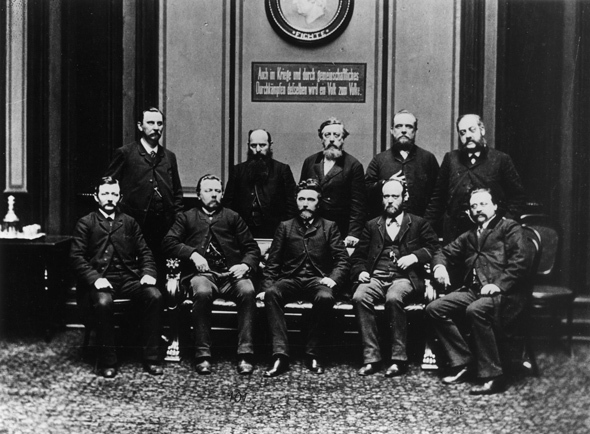
Liebknecht (standing, center) with the rest of the SPD's Reichstag faction, 1889

Liebknecht was a leading figure in the founding of the Second International in 1889. He co-chaired the founding congress in Paris with the French socialist Édouard Vaillant and was a dominant voice in its proceedings. He jealously guarded his role as the primary link between the German party and the international socialist movement. After the repeal of the Anti-Socialist Laws in 1890, the party was renamed the Social Democratic Party of Germany (SPD). Liebknecht moved to Berlin to become editor-in-chief of the party's central organ, Vorwärts. In the 1890s, his influence in the national party leadership began to decline, as a younger generation of leaders, including Bebel, Paul Singer, and Ignaz Auer, took on more direct control of the party's day-to-day administration. His control over Vorwärts was also progressively undermined by the party executive.

Liebknecht was defeated at the 1891 Erfurt Congress over the new party program; his draft was replaced by a more radically worded version co-authored by Karl Kautsky. This outcome reflected a shift in German Marxism. Since the 1860s, Liebknecht had been regarded as the primary German disciple of Marx, but his Marxism was based more on personal acquaintance with Marx and Engels than on a deep study of their theoretical works. The new program was drafted by the younger, more studious generation of Marxists, including Kautsky and Eduard Bernstein. During the debates, Liebknecht pointed with pride to his theoretical independence from any single doctrine. In his speech endorsing the new program, he explained the need to remove Lassallean remnants and adopt a program that was "written in clear and universally understood language".

Nevertheless, Liebknecht remained a respected figurehead and the "elder statesman" of the party. He spent his later years continuing his work as a journalist and Reichstag deputy, and as a prominent speaker at party congresses and international gatherings. He remained a staunch defender of party precedent and orthodox Marxism against the rise of revisionism, spearheaded by Bernstein. In his last major speech, he condemned European imperialism and the growing threat of world war. Liebknecht died suddenly of a stroke in Charlottenburg, Berlin, on 7 August 1900. His funeral was a massive political demonstration, attended by an estimated fifty thousand people.

== Personal life ==
Liebknecht married his first wife, Ernestine Landolt, in 1854. They had two daughters: Alice (born 1856) and Gertrude (born 1863). Ernestine died of tuberculosis in 1867; her death was exacerbated by the hardships of Liebknecht's political life, including his imprisonment in 1866–1867.

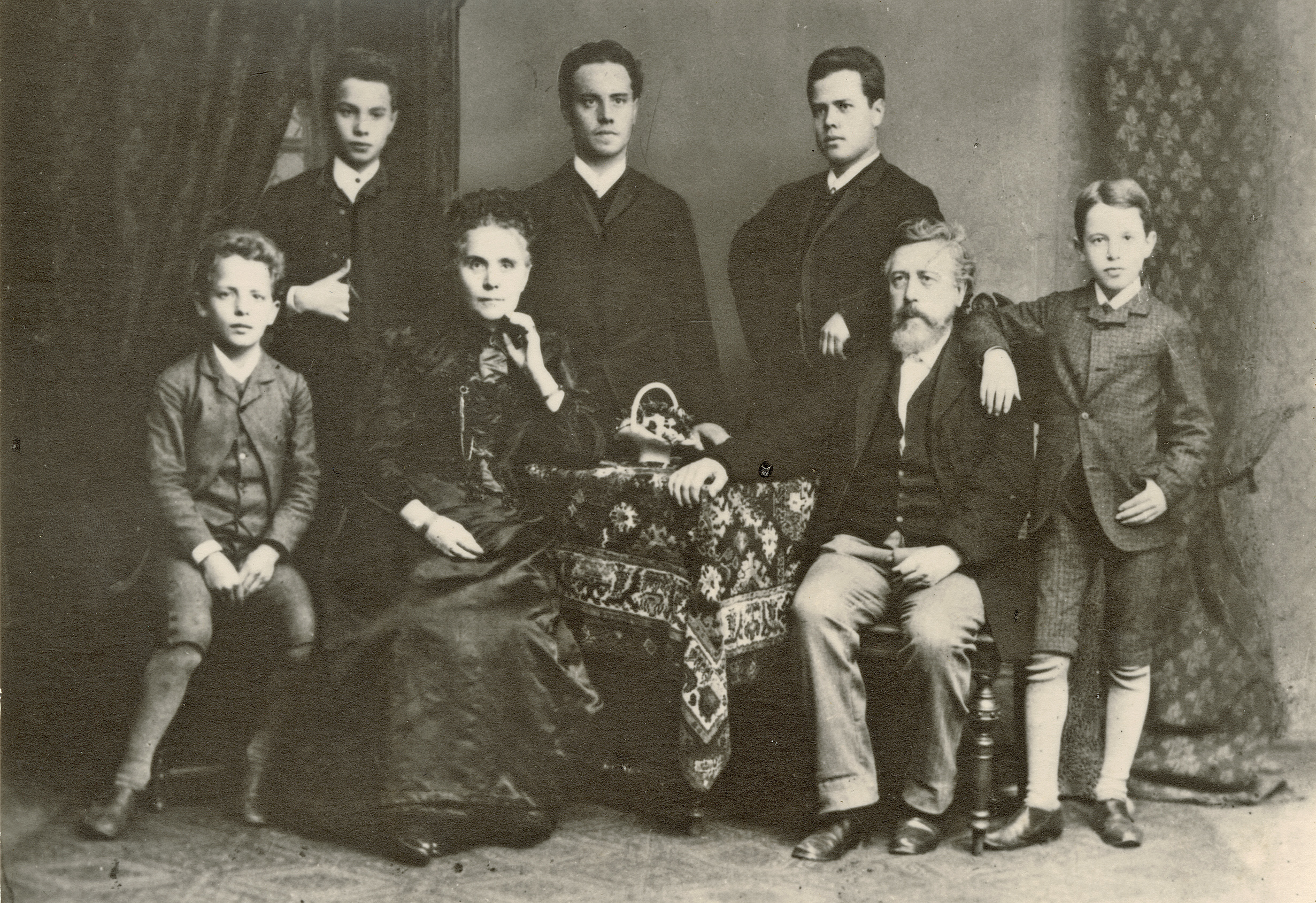
Liebknecht with his second wife Natalie Reh and their sons, 1890

In 1868, he married his second wife, Natalie Reh, the daughter of a lawyer who had been a delegate to the Frankfurt Parliament. They had five sons: Theodor (1870–1948), Karl (1871–1919), Otto (1876–1949), Wilhelm, and Adolf. Marx and Engels were the godfathers of his son Karl, who became a prominent socialist and communist leader and was murdered in 1919 for his role in the Spartacist uprising.

== Legacy ==
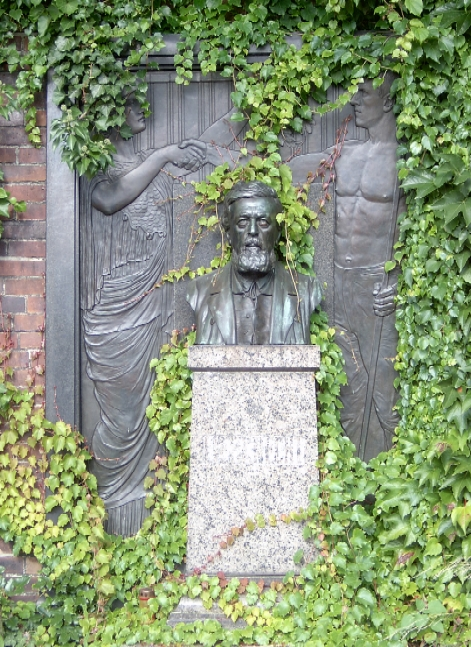
Grave of Liebknecht in Zentralfriedhof Friedrichsfelde, Berlin

Liebknecht is widely recognized as one of the principal founders of the Social Democratic Party of Germany. His career spanned the transition of the German workers' movement from small, sectarian groups to a mass political party. He successfully navigated the party through the difficult period of the Anti-Socialist Laws, and his leadership was instrumental in creating the organizational and ideological foundations that shaped the SPD for decades.

His political legacy is complex and contested. He is seen as a key figure in the adaptation of Marxist ideas to the context of legal, parliamentary politics. His leadership style, often described as that of an "affective leader", prioritized party unity and was crucial in mediating conflicts and holding together the various factions of the early German socialist movement. He was a committed democrat who rejected the concept of a conspiratorial seizure of power and the "dictatorship of the proletariat", arguing that a socialist society could only be built on a democratic foundation with the support of a majority of the people. He argued, "Socialism without democracy is pseudo-Socialism, just as democracy without Socialism is pseudo-democracy. The democratic state is the only feasible form for a society organized on a Socialist basis."

His legacy is claimed by both revolutionary and reformist traditions. Marxist–Leninists in East Germany viewed him as a revolutionary forerunner who upheld the principles of class struggle. Vladimir Lenin himself cited Liebknecht's pamphlet No Compromise—No Political Trading to justify a revolutionary, anti-compromise stance in Russia. In contrast, West German social democrats emphasized his commitment to democratic principles and his role as a builder of a legal, mass-based party. Historian William A. Pelz noted that Liebknecht was a "casualty of the cold war", with his revolutionary aspects often downplayed in the West and his democratic principles often overlooked in the East.

== Selected works ==
- Robert Blum und Seine Zeit, Nürnberg, 1896 (German)
- Ein Blick in die Neue Welt, Stuttgart, 1887
- Die Emscher Depesche oder wie Kriege gemacht werden, Nürnberg, 1895
- Robert Owen: Sein Leben und sozialpolitischen Wirken, Nürnberg, 1892
- Zur Grund- und Bodenfrage, Leipzig, 1876
- Karl Marx: Biographical Memoirs, Chicago, 1906
