= Gustav Mayer =

German journalist and historian (1871–1948)

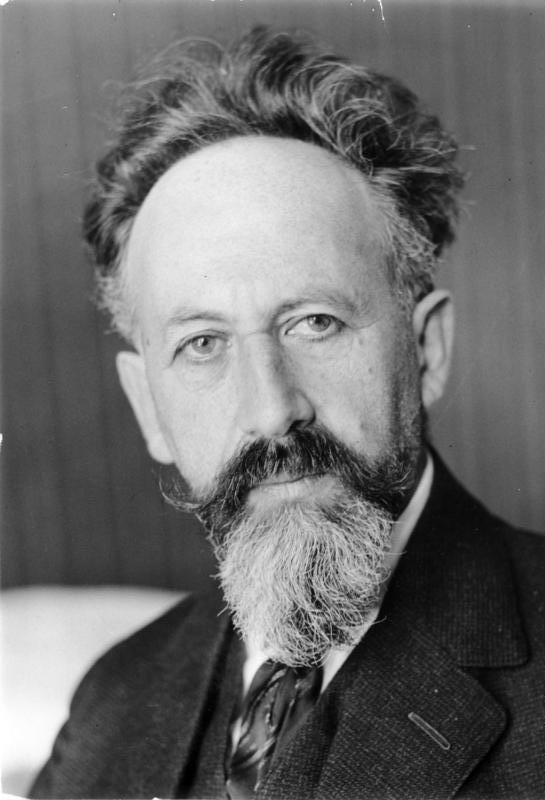
- Gustav Mayer, 1931
- Born: 4 October 1871; Prenzlau, Brandenburg, German Empire
- Died: 21 February 1948; Kensington, London, England
- Occupations: Journalist, Professor
- Political party: KPD (1945–1946); SED (1947–1948)
- Spouse: Henriette "Flora" Wolff (1882–1963)
- Children: Peter Mayer (1907–1941); Ulrich Philip Mayer (1910–1995)
- Parent(s): David Mayer; Clara Devora Mayer/Gottschalk
- Relatives: Karl Jaspers (brother in law)

Gustav Mayer (4 October 1871 – 21 February 1948) was a German journalist and historian with a particular focus on the labour movement. He fled Nazi Germany in 1933 and lived the final years of his life in England.

== Life ==
Gustav Mayer was born into a long-established Jewish mercantile family in Prenzlau, a small town in central northern Germany. The family had settled in Prentzlau in 1677, having previously lived in Oderberg. His upbringing combined traditional Jewish values and beliefs with a keen appreciation of German intellectual developments more generally. While growing up he acquired a deep knowledge of the German classics which would underpin his subsequent work. He studied Public Economics (Nationalökonomie) between 1890 and 1893, being particularly influenced by the ideas of the so-called academic socialists ("Kathedersozialisten") Gustav Schmoller and Adolph Wagner. He received his doctorate for work on Ferdinand Lassalle from Basel, for which he was supervised by Georg Adler. For the next few years he undertook various jobs and other activities, at one stage embarking on an apprenticeship as a book dealer.

In 1896, he took a position with the Frankfurter Zeitung as a trade and business journalist, and worked as a foreign correspondent for the newspaper till 1906. His remit covered the Netherlands, Belgium and France, allowing him important networking opportunities and brining him into contact with pioneers of European socialism such as Jean Jaurès and Emile Vandervelde.

Gustav Mayer married Flora Wolff (1882–1962) on 26 October 1905, which afforded him a degree of financial independence and enabled him to resign from his staff job with the newspaper. He embarked on a career that initially combined work as a private tutor with freelance journalism, but soon turned to full-time scholarship, devoting himself to the study of the German labour movement, based first in Heidelberg and later in Berlin. In 1910, his sister Gertrude married Gustav's friend Karl Jaspers, the psychiatrist and later philosopher.

With the outbreak of war in July 1914, Mayer's research work was interrupted. Conscripted for service in Belgium, he was involved in the administrative aspects of the occupation. At the end of the war there were suggestions that Mayer's high-level contacts with international socialists might enable him to provide useful support to the German delegation sent to negotiate the peace, but nothing came of this.

Although he made a point of not joining any political party, four years of war left Mayer's interest in the unfolding history of the labour movement undimmed. Despite his undoubted academic qualities and the support of Hermann Oncken, when it came to a vote by the evaluation committee, the dissertation that he submitted to the Philosophy Faculty of Berlin University in 1918 failed to earn him the hoped for habilitation qualification. The next year he nevertheless obtained a teaching position on the history of democracy, and this was extended in 1922 to a full professorship in political history, initially at the University of Berlin and later at Frankfurt am Main.

In the meantime, in 1920, he published "Friedrich Engels in seiner Frühzeit 1820-1851" ("The early years of Friedrich Engels"), as the first volume of a planned two-volume biography. The second volume was to be distributed in Germany in 1933, but due to the increasing control of the Nazi party the text was produced in the Netherlands by the publishers Martinus Nijhoff of Leiden. The Engels biography was only the most high-profile of several biographies and compendia of letters and speeches from nineteenth century labour movement leaders that Mayer produced during the 1920s and 1930s.

Sources are imprecise as to when Mayer left Germany, but between 1933 and 1936 he appears according to some sources to have been based in the Netherlands. Another states that it took him three years to arrange his family's emigration, partly due to difficulties over the level of his pension entitlements which in the end proved irrelevant because of a ban on transferring pensions abroad. He was further impoverished through the application by German tax authorities of the country's Emigration Tax, which in the end amounted to 65,000 Marks. In 1936, Gustav Mayer spoke only broken English so that there was no question of obtaining an academic teaching post, but in London he was able to become a staff member of the International Institute of Social History (IISH). He sold his library to the IISH to raise funds and in 1936 he managed to obtain an unpaid fellowship with the London School of Economics. In later years, on various occasions Mayer lamented in writing the paralyzing effect of his bafflement as his family faced the application of antisemitic doctrines once the Nazi party took over the government of Germany. In 1940, with other income sources gone, a relative was able to secure him a £300 annual stipendium from the Rockefeller Foundation.

While in London, Mayer produced some research on the early years of the labour movement in Britain, but with the outbreak of war in 1939 the family was evacuated to the countryside. With no access to research libraries, Mayer produced a memoir. The tragedy of the slaughter of friends and relatives through the unfolding Shoah in Germany was compounded for the Mayers by the suicide, early in 1941, of their son Peter. Their younger son, settled in England, abandoning his first name Ulrich and becoming known as Philip Mayer, obtaining a doctorate from Oxford and building a career as a social anthropologist with his wife Iona whom he married in 1946.

== Works ==
- Johann Baptist von Schweitzer und die Sozialdemokratie. Ein Beitrag zur Geschichte der deutschen Arbeiterbewegung. Gustav Fischer, Jena 1909 (Reprint Detlev Auvermann, Glashütten im Taunus 1970)
- Friedrich Engels. Eine Biographie Bd. 1: Friedrich Engels in seiner Frühzeit. Bd. 2: Engels und der Aufstieg der Arbeiterbewegung in Europa. Martinus Nijhoff, Haag ²1934/1934 (Erstausgabe 1920; 1933 eingestampft)
- Friedrich Engels: A Biography (Alfred A. Knopf, 1936)
- Ferdinand Lassalle: Nachgelassene Briefe und Schriften. Hrsg. von Gustav Mayer. 6 Bde., Deutsche Verlagsanstalt, Berlin 1921–1925 Historische Kommission München
- Bismarck und Lassalle. Ihr Briefwechsel und ihre Gespräche. J. H. W. Dietz Nachf., Berlin 1928
- Erinnerungen. Vom Journalisten zum Historiker der deutschen Arbeiterbewegung. Europaverlag, Zürich 1949
- Radikalismus, Sozialismus und bürgerliche Demokratie. Hrsg. und mit einem Nachwort versehen von Hans-Ulrich Wehler. Suhrkamp Verlag, Frankfurt am Main 1969 (edition suhrkamp 310)

The catalogue of the German national library lists 47 works by or about Gustav Mayer.
