= Anti-Socialist Laws =

Law of the German Empire

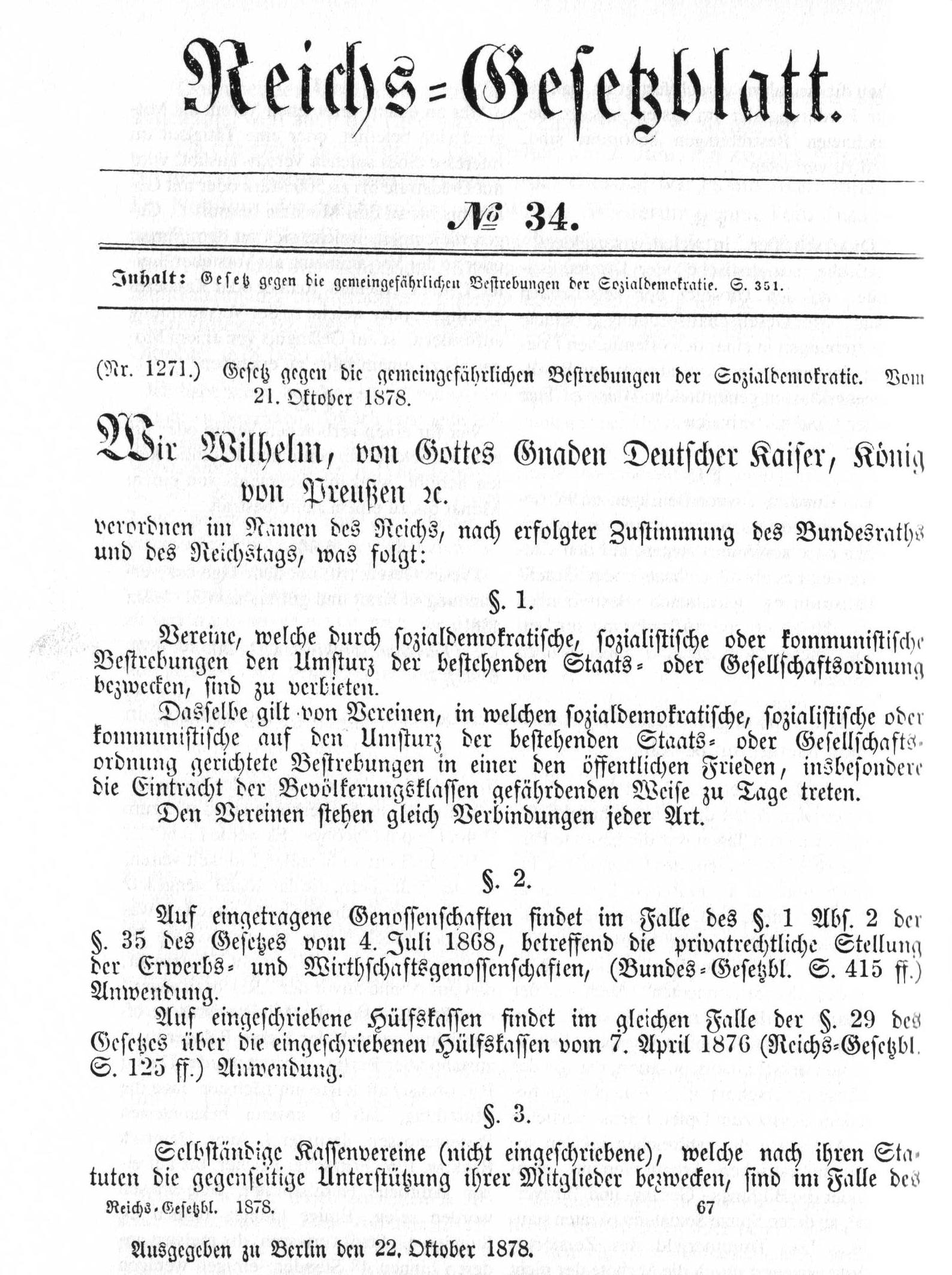
The official promulgation of the Anti-Socialist Law in the Reichsgesetzblatt of 21 October 1878

The Anti-Socialist Laws or Socialist Laws (German: Sozialistengesetze; officially Gesetz gegen die gemeingefährlichen Bestrebungen der Sozialdemokratie, "Law against the public danger of social democratic endeavors") was an act of the Reichstag of the German Empire passed on 19 October 1878. After its original two-and-a-half year term had been extended four times, it was allowed to lapse on 30 September 1890. Its many provisions and extensions have led to it frequently being referred to in the plural even though it was a single law.

Proposed and vigorously backed by Chancellor Otto von Bismarck, the law banned socialist, social democratic and communist associations and prohibited meetings and publications whose purpose was the overthrow of the existing state and social order. It led to a large number of arrests and expulsions and to social democratic activities going underground or abroad. Since it did not affect electoral laws, men with known social democratic backgrounds could run as independents and if elected speak freely in the Reichstag or a state's Landtag under the protection of parliamentary immunity.

The law did not accomplish its goal of suppressing social democracy even after Bismarck, in an attempt to win voters away from the workers' movement, introduced a number of social insurance programs that were groundbreaking for their time. Solidarity among workers increased, and votes for social democratic candidates to the Reichstag more than quadrupled to over 1.4 million during the life of the law. The Reichstag's failure to extend the law in 1890 played a significant role in Bismarck being forced to resign as chancellor of Germany.

== Background ==
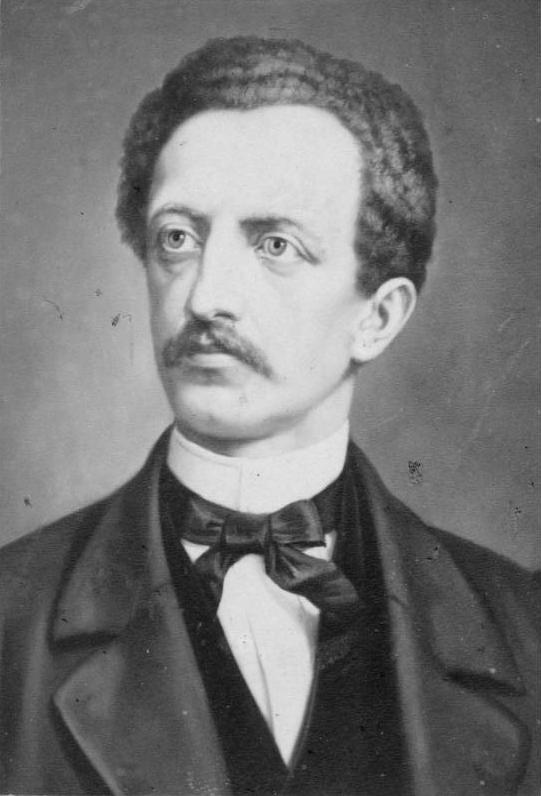
Ferdinand Lassalle, founder of the General German Workers' Association (ADAV)

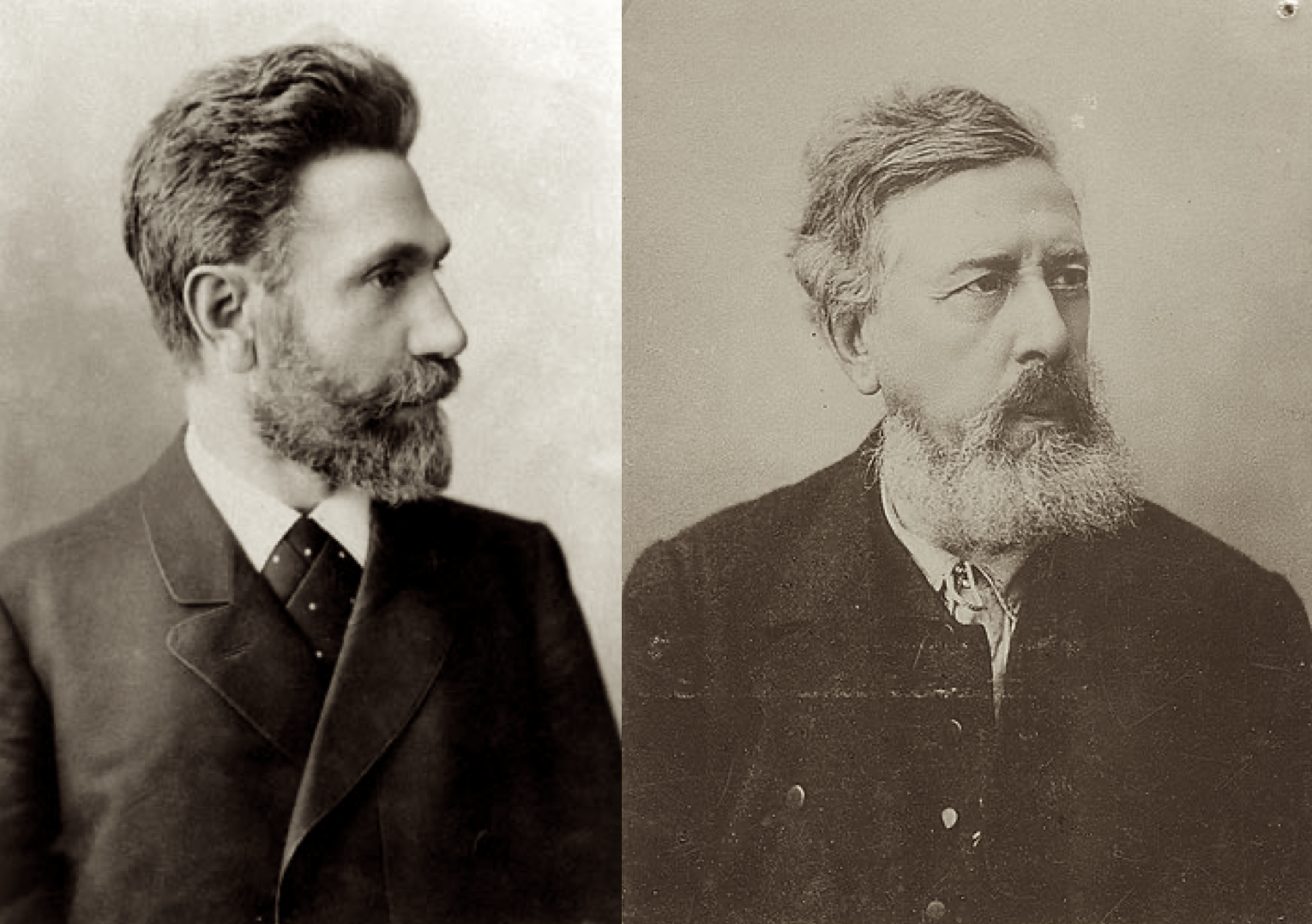
August Bebel and Wilhelm Liebknecht (father of Karl Liebknecht), co-founders of the Socialist Workers' Party of Germany (SAPD)

Two initially competing social democratic parties were established in Germany before the founding of the German Empire in 1871. The reform-oriented General German Workers' Association (ADAV) was founded in 1863 on the initiative of Ferdinand Lassalle, and the revolutionary Marxist Social Democratic Workers' Party of Germany (SDAP) in 1869 by August Bebel and Wilhelm Liebknecht. The two parties merged in 1875 to form the Socialist Workers' Party of Germany (SAPD), which was renamed the Social Democratic Party of Germany (SPD) in 1890.

Otto von Bismarck, the Empire's first and longest-serving chancellor, was an adherent of monarchical principles of government who had a restrained or even hostile attitude to democratic ideas and feared the outbreak of a socialist revolution similar to the one that created the Paris Commune in 1871. He considered the SDAP an enemy of the Empire and attempted repressive measures against social democracy and the nascent trade union movement early in his term of office. In 1874 a repressive press law and in 1875 an attempt to criminalize "incitement to class hatred" failed in the face of opposition by the National Liberal Party, although in Prussia, the Empire's dominant state, the local parliament forced the ADAV to disband in 1875.

In 1878, two unsuccessful assassination attempts were carried out against Emperor Wilhelm I: on 11 May by Max Hödel and on 2 June by Karl Eduard Nobiling. Bismarck took advantage of the attempts to propose the Anti-Socialist Law as a means to crack down more rigorously on the social democrats, who since the founding of the Empire had gone from one to 13 seats in the Reichstag. Although Hödel had been expelled from the SAPD shortly before his attack and Nobiling's assassination attempt was motivated by personal delusions, Bismarck allowed the narrative to be spread that the attacks were the work of social democrats.

== Laws ==
=== Debate and passage ===
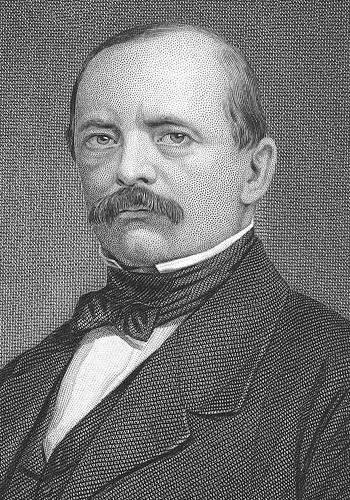
Chancellor Otto von Bismarck, the chief sponsor and backer of the Anti-Socialist Law, in 1873

After the first attempt on the Emperor's life, Bismarck presented a draft "Law on defence against social democratic outrages" (Gesetz zur Abwehr sozialdemokratischer Ausschreitungen), which the Reichstag rejected by a vote of 251 to 57. The law's wording was so broad that even centrist parties such as the National Liberals thought that the law could be directed against them. Bismarck had in fact assumed that the National Liberals would oppose the measure and that he could then brand them as accomplices of the social democrats. Bismarck-friendly newspapers accused the National Liberals of not being aware of the "red danger".

Following the second assassination attempt that left the Emperor seriously wounded, Bismarck used the ensuing public fury to dissolve the Reichstag and orchestrate a "war of annihilation" against the social democrats, whom he accused of intellectual complicity. Even though no restrictive laws had yet been passed, prominent social democrats had their houses searched and papers confiscated during the election campaign. As Bismarck had hoped, the newly elected Reichstag was significantly more conservative than the previous: the National Liberals lost 30 seats and the two main conservative parties, the Free Conservatives and the German Conservatives, gained 38.

During the debate on the anti-socialist bill that Bismarck then introduced, August Bebel used his parliamentary immunity to let the public know what had happened after the previous Reichstag was dissolved:

Just as in the Middle Ages religious dissenters ... were persecuted, in the last quarter of the nineteenth century a general war of hatred was staged against social democrats as political dissenters. Men of social democratic convictions were thrown out of work and bread and their livelihoods were cut off, they were insulted and slandered and declared to be without honor or rights.

In a parliamentary committee formed to discuss the draft bill (on which no social democrats sat), Eduard Lasker of the National Liberals was able to get a clause added requiring that it be put before the Reichstag every two-and-a-half years for a reauthorization vote. Using the conservative press, Bismarck let it be known that if the National Liberals allowed any additional changes, they would risk yet another new election. On 19 October 1878, the bill's supporters prevailed in a 221 to 149 vote. All National Liberals voted for the law, as did the members of the two conservative parties, while those from the left-liberal German Progress Party, the Catholic Centre Party – which had been the object of Bismarck's anti-Catholic Kulturkampf – and the SAPD voted against it.

On 21 October 1878, the Bundesrat approved and Emperor Wilhelm I signed the law. It became legally binding when it was promulgated the following day. It was subsequently renewed 4 times: in 1880, 1884, 1886 and 1888. The law expired on 30 September 1890, after Bismarck had resigned as chancellor.

=== Prohibitions and penalties ===
The law prohibited societies, meetings, publications, public festivities and processions that "aim[ed] at the overthrow of the existing political or social order through social-democratic, socialist or communist endeavors". It also banned collecting or appealing for contributions to support such activities. When a society or publication was prohibited, its cash assets, printed material and any other "objects intended for the purposes of the society" were to be confiscated. Prohibitions could be appealed, but they would still go into effect immediately. Participation in elections and membership in parliamentary bodies were notably not banned.

Members of prohibited societies or anyone engaged in an activity in its interest or who attended a prohibited meeting could be fined up to 500 marks or imprisoned for up to three months. Any who participated "in a society or assembly as chairmen, leaders, monitors, agents, speakers, or treasurers, or those who issue[d] invitations to attend the meeting" could be imprisoned for between one and twelve months. Those who provided a place of meeting could, in addition to the prison time, have their businesses closed. Anyone who distributed or reprinted a prohibited publication could be fined up to 1,000 marks and sentenced to as much as six months in prison. Those convicted under the laws could be denied residence in a district or, if a foreigner, expelled from the country.

== Effects ==
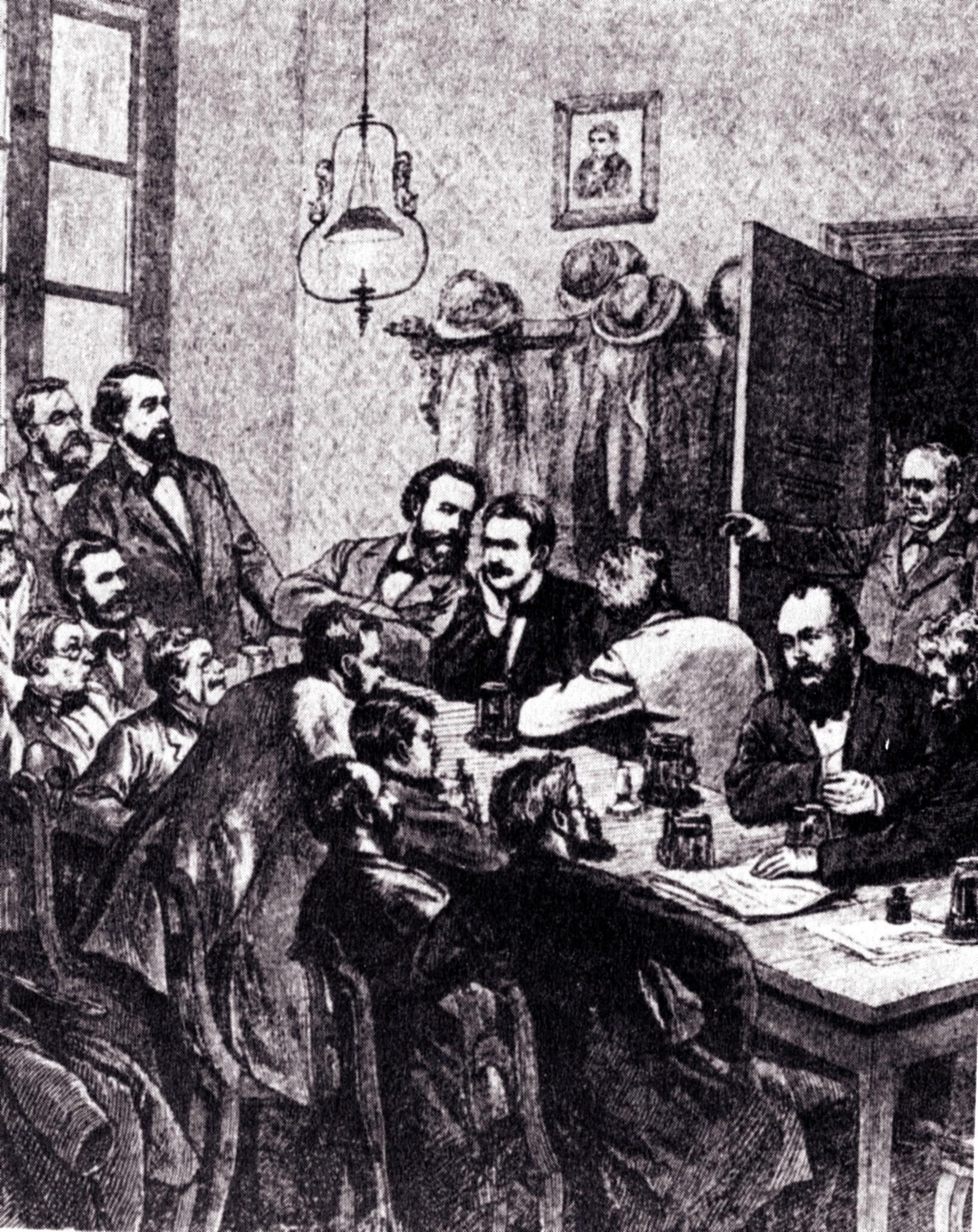
Breakup of a socialist meeting in Leipzig, from an illustration accompanying the article Convicted Social Democrats in the magazine Daheim in 1881. Among those pictured are Wilhelm Hasenclever seated at the table (second from right), Wilhelm Liebknecht standing in front of the window, and August Bebel seated in front of Liebknecht.

The law resulted in the banning of the Socialist Workers' Party of Germany (SAPD) and its affiliated organizations such as trade unions. Altogether some 330 workers' organizations, including many trade unions, were banned during the twelve-year life of the law. 797 social democrats were expelled as "agitators" from cities where a minor state of siege was imposed. They included Berlin in November 1878 (67 expelled) and Hamburg in 1880 (350 expelled). Many socialists went into exile under the political pressure of the law, mainly to France, Switzerland, England and the United States of America.

The Anti-Socialist Law did not affect electoral laws or parliamentary immunity. Men who were known to have social democratic backgrounds were still able to run as individuals in elections and legally participate in parliamentary work in the Reichstag and state parliaments. When the law was passed, SAPD members Wilhelm Liebknecht, August Bebel, Wilhelm Hasenclever and Wilhelm Hasselmann had been Reichstag members since the 1874 elections.

The SAPD's leadership called for a response of strict legality. As existing organizations were banned, members formed outwardly non-political groups ranging from singing clubs to relief groups that pooled money to help members who were sick or out of work. Social democratic publications moved outside the country, and copies were smuggled from there into all parts of Germany through the "red field post". Der Sozialdemokrat became the main newspaper of German and international social democracy during the life of the Anti-Socialist Law. It was published in Zurich beginning in 1879 and distributed illegally in Germany, reaching a circulation of about 10,000 by 1886. After Swiss authorities expelled its editors in 1888, it was published and printed in London.

In contrast to the careful and pragmatic approach of party leaders, some party members radicalized in the face of the government's crackdown. According to historian Volker Ullrich, "Only ... in the intensified confrontation with the class state did Marx's theories find widespread resonance, because they met the need for a party ideology that explained the de facto pariah status of social democracy and at the same time pointed the way to a better future." Among the rank and file, the repression increased the sense of solidarity, and sympathy for their situation was felt not only in Germany's working class but also extended well into the bourgeoisie. Late in 1880, Berlin's police president noted

that the courage of German social democracy remains unbroken, that the movement, which had slackened somewhat for a time, has now gained new momentum, and that people's minds are once again filled with the best hopes.

Despite the prohibitions, membership in labor unions grew from 50,000 before the Anti-Socialist Law to 250,000 when it lapsed in 1890. During the final three years under the law, there were 670 strikes in Germany.

Bismarck was aware of the relative limitations of repressive measures. He therefore worked with the forces of reform in the Empire to push through social legislation that was progressive for its time. The goal was to win social democrats over to the government side by showing them that "the state is not merely a necessary institution but also a benevolent one". Bismarck successfully had health insurance passed in 1883, accident insurance in 1884 and old age and disability insurance in 1889. The measures, which were relatively weak, did little to slow the growing strength of the social democrats. The party received 312,000 votes in 1881, 550,000 in 1884, 763,000 in 1887 and 1,427,000 in 1890. With the latter result, the SAPD won the most votes of any party in the Empire, although because of increasingly unequal numbers of voters in urban versus rural districts, it held only 35 of the 397 seats in the Reichstag.

== Lapse ==
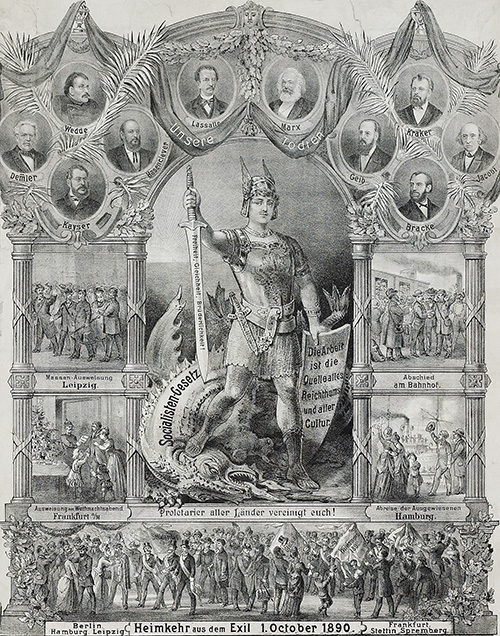
Poster celebrating the end of the Anti-Socialist Law and the return of leading socialist figures from exile. The sword of the knight who has slain the dragon of the Socialist Law carries the words "freedom, equality, fraternity" and his shield "work is the source of all wealth and all culture".

As the time to renew the Anti-socialist Law in 1890 approached, Bismarck wanted to either make the law both permanent and harsher or to incorporate its measures into the Empire's criminal code. The fifth attempt to extend the Socialist Law on 25 January 1890 failed in the Reichstag by a vote of 169 against and 98 for. The deputies of the German Reich Party and the National Liberals voted in favor of the extension, while the Centre Party, Free-minded Party, Conservative Party, SAPD and the representatives of the Poles, Danes and Alsace-Lorraine voted against it. The law officially lapsed on 30 September 1890.

The key point of contention in the final debate over the law was the clause that allowed those convicted under it to be denied residency, a power which Bismarck wanted to strengthen and the Reichstag to remove. Overall, however, it was the continued growth and strength of the social democratic movement and the inability of Bismarck's supporters to find common ground on how to fight it that led to the law's lapse.

Bismarck's failure to pass a permanent anti-socialist law and the strengthening of social democracy in the 1890 Reichstag election played a decisive role in Bismarck's dismissal by Emperor Wilhelm II, who had ascended the throne in 1888.

Overall, social democracy emerged stronger from the conflict with the German government. In the first Reichstag election after the end of the Anti-Socialist Law on 15 June 1893, the Social Democratic Party received more votes than any other party in the Reichstag (1,787,000).

== Timeline ==
- 11 May 1878: Max Hödel attempted to assassinate Wilhelm I.
- 2 June 1878: Karl Nobiling badly wounded Wilhelm I.
- 11 June 1878: the Reichstag was dissolved.
- 30 July 1878: in the Reichstag election, socialists lost four of their 12 seats.
- 19 October 1878: the Anti-Socialist Law was passed by the two conservative parties and the National Liberals, 221 to 149. The Social Democrats voluntarily dissolved the party.
- 18 November 1878: a minor state of siege was declared in Berlin, with 67 social democrats expelled.
- 21–23 August 1880: the Wyden party congress saw the expulsion of Johann Most and Wilhelm Hasselmann for anarchism by the SAPD's moderate wing.
- 28 October 1880: a minor state of siege was declared in Hamburg.
- June 1881: a minor state of siege was declared in Leipzig, with local SAPD organization disbanded.
- 8 September 1881: the moderate socialist Louis Viereck begged Friedrich Engels to tone down the radicalism of the party newspaper Der Sozialdemocrat.
- 19–21 August 1882: a secret conference in Zürich organized by August Bebel partly healed the division between moderates and radicals.
- 1883: enforcement of the Anti-Socialist Law was relaxed, strengthening the SAPD.
- 2 April 1886: the Reichstag voted 173 to 146 to renew the Anti-Socialist Law.
- 11 April 1886: the Prussian interior minister Puttkamer issued the strike decree which gave the police the power to use the Anti-Socialist Law against strikers and expel their leaders.
- 11 May 1886: political meetings in Berlin needed police permission 48 hours in advance.
- 31 July 1886: nine social democratic leaders were convicted at the Saxon state court for joining an illegal organization.
- 16 December 1886: a minor state of siege in was declared Frankfurt am Main.
- Fall 1887: Bismarck failed to get the social democratic leaders expelled from Germany.
- 2 May 1889: a coal miners strike in the Ruhr was not supported by the SAPD.
- 25 January 1890: the Reichstag refused to renew the Anti-Socialist Law.
- 20 February 1890: the Social Democrats won 19.75% of the vote.
- 18 March 1890: Bismarck resigned.

== See also ==
- Anti-terrorism legislation
- Lois scélérates
