= Johann Baptist von Schweitzer =

German politician and playwright (1833–1875)

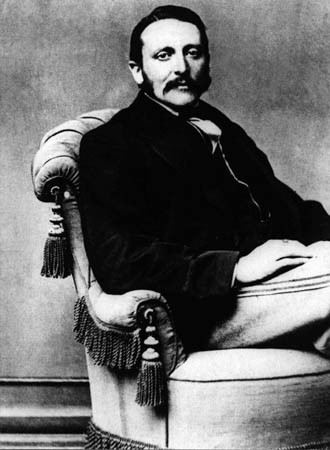
- Schweitzer in 1863

President of the General German Workers' Association
- In office 20 May 1867 – 30 June 1871
- Preceded by: August Perl
- Succeeded by: Wilhelm Hasenclever

Member of the Reichstag of the North German Confederation
- In office 7 September 1867 – 3 March 1871

Personal details
- Born: 12 July 1833 Frankfurt am Main, German Confederation
- Died: 28 July 1875 (aged 42) Giessbach, canton of Bern, Switzerland
- Party: General German Workers' Association
- Education: Humboldt University of Berlin; Heidelberg University
- Profession: Politician, playwright, poet

Johann Baptist von Schweitzer (12 July 1833 – 28 July 1875) was a German politician, dramatic poet and playwright.

== Life and political career ==
Schweitzer was born at Frankfurt am Main, of an old aristocratic Catholic family. He studied law in Berlin and Heidelberg, and afterwards practised in his native city. He was, however, generally more interested in politics and literature than law.

Schweitzer was attracted by the social democratic movement, then led in Germany by Ferdinand Lassalle. Lassalle defended him from calls for his expulsion from the movement after he was convicted of a public indency charge for pederasty in 1862. Historian Gustav Mayer in 1909 described the incident as follows:

It was stated there that between nine and ten on the morning of August 4, 1862, the accused was arrested in the Mannheim Palace Park for having there seduced a boy under fourteen years of age into undertaking an indecent act. But since the boy ran away and his age could not therefore be ascertained, the sentence that resulted was not for a crime against morality [Verbrechen gegen die Sittlichkeit], but only for the giving of public offense through the public perpetration of an indecent act [Erregung öffentlichen Ärgernisses durch öffentliche Verübung einer unsittlichen Handlung].

Schweitzer served two weeks in jail in Bruchsal for the offence. Lassalle argued that the "abnormality attributed to Dr. von Schweitzer has nothing whatever to do with his political character."

After Lassalle's death in 1864, Schweitzer on 20 May 1867, became president of the General German Workers' Association (German: Allgemeiner Deutscher Arbeiter-Verein, ADAV). The ADAV began fracturing soon thereafter, as disputes over whether to cooperate with Otto von Bismarck's government led Wilhelm Liebknecht and others to leave the ADAV in the years after 1864. Liebknecht and August Bebel founded the Social Democratic Workers' Party of Germany (German: Sozialdemokratische Arbeiterpartei Deutschlands, SDAP) in 1869.

Schweitzer edited the ADAV's newspaper Der Sozialdemokrat (English: The Social Democrat), which brought him into frequent trouble with the Prussian government.

On 7 September 1867, he was elected as a deputy to the Reichstag of the North German Confederation, with the help of Lassalle.

In an article for Der Sozialdemokrat on 7 October 1868, he coined the term "democratic centralization", now known as democratic centralism, to describe the structure of the ADAV.

On his failure to secure election to the newly formed German Reichstag on 3 March 1871, he resigned the presidency of the ADAV and retired from political life. The ADAV later merged with the SDAP at the Gotha Congress in 1875 to form the Socialist Workers' Party of Germany (German: Sozialistische Arbeiterpartei Deutschlands, SAPD), the forerunner of the modern-day Social Democratic Party of Germany (SPD).

He died of pneumonia in Giessbach, Switzerland on 28 July 1875.

== Conflict with Karl Marx and Friedrich Engels ==
Immediately following the death of Lassalle, Schweitzer suggested to Liebknecht that Karl Marx should succeed Lassalle as president of the ADAV. In response, Liebknecht proposed to dissolve the office of the presidency and transform it into a board of directors, which would also control Der Sozialdemokrat. Schweitzer disagreed with the proposal regarding control of the paper and asked Marx, Friedrich Engels and Liebknecht to collaborate on the paper.

Marx assented to this proposal until breaking with Schweitzer, after suspecting Schweitzer knew of and supported Lassalle's contact with Otto von Bismarck, then chancellor of the North German Confederation. This split was worsened by Schweitzer's support of Bismarck published in articles in early 1865.

Marx and Engels compiled their criticism in an unpublished 6 February 1865 statement of the International Workingmen's Association (IWA), and finally made their split official with a public statement of the IWA justifying their decision, published in the papers Barmer Zeitung and Elberfelder Zeitung on 26 February 1865.

By March 1865, Marx was scathing of Schweitzer, writing in a letter to Engels on 10 March:

The impudence of Mr Schweitzer, who knows perfectly well that all I need to do is publish his own letters, is fantastic. Though what else can the shitty cur do? [...] You must arrange for a few jokes about the fellow to reach [Carl] Siebel, for him to hawk around to the various papers.

The author Hubert Kennedy identifies the latter statement as an instruction to joke about Schweitzer's alleged homosexuality.

== Works ==
Schweitzer composed a number of dramas and comedies, of which several for a while had considerable success. Among them may be mentioned:

- Alcibiades (Frankfurt, 1858)
- Friedrich Barbarossa (Frankfurt, 1858)
- Canossa (Berlin, 1872)
- Die Darwinianer (Frankfurt, 1875)
- Die Eidechse (Frankfurt, 1876)
- Epidemisch (Frankfurt, 1876)

He also wrote one political novel, Lucinde oder Kapital und Arbeit (Frankfurt, 1864).
