= August Bebel =

German social democratic politician (1840–1913)

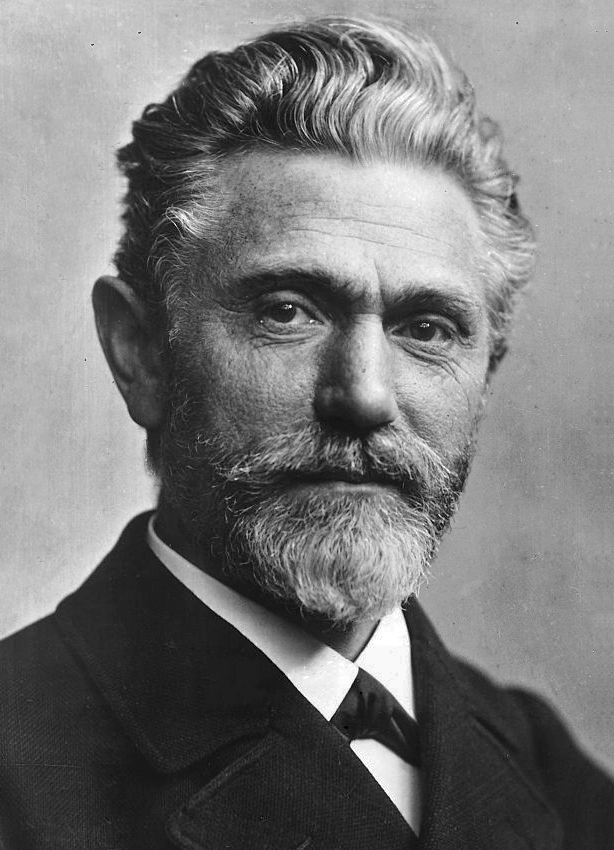
- Bebel, c. 1900

Chairman of the Social Democratic Party of Germany
- In office 21 November 1892 – 13 August 1913
- Preceded by: Paul Singer; Alwin Gerisch
- Succeeded by: Hugo Haase; Friedrich Ebert

Member of the Reichstag (German Empire)
- In office 21 March 1871 – 13 August 1913

(North German Confederation)
- In office 10 September 1867 – 10 December 1870

Personal details
- Born: Ferdinand August Bebel; 22 February 1840 Deutz (Cologne), Rhine Province, Kingdom of Prussia
- Died: 13 August 1913 (aged 73) Passug, Churwalden, Switzerland
- Party: SVP (1866–1869); SDAP (1869–1875); SPD (from 1875) (Note: The Social Democratic Party of Germany was named the Socialist Workers’ Party of Germany from its founding in 1875 until it adopted its current name in 1890.)
- Other political affiliations: First International (1866-1876) Second International (from 1889)
- Profession: Turner
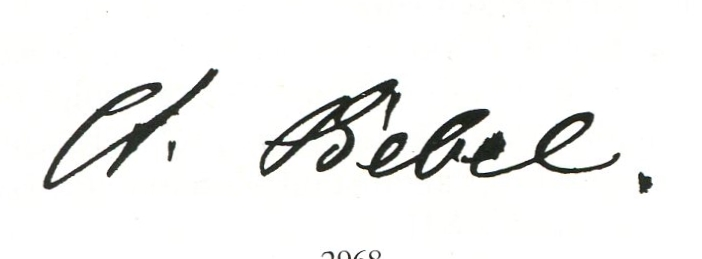
- Signature

Ferdinand August Bebel (22 February 1840 – 13 August 1913) was a German social democratic politician. One of the founders of the Social Democratic Party of Germany (SPD), he was a leader of the German workers' movement for over four decades. Bebel served as a member of parliament in the North German Confederation from 1867 to 1870 and in the German Empire from 1871 until his death in 1913 (excepting 1881-1883), becoming the movement's leading parliamentary voice.

Born into poverty in Prussia, Bebel was orphaned at a young age and apprenticed as a woodturner. His experiences as a traveling journeyman exposed him to the hardships of the working class and led him to socialist politics in the 1860s. With Wilhelm Liebknecht, he was a founder of the Social Democratic Workers' Party of Germany (SDAP) in 1869, which in 1875 merged with the General German Workers' Association to form what would become the SPD. Bebel became a central figure in the German socialist movement, opposing the nationalist and state-oriented socialism of Ferdinand Lassalle in favor of a more orthodox Marxist, internationalist position. During the Franco-Prussian War, he gained notoriety for his opposition to the annexation of Alsace-Lorraine, which led to his conviction for high treason in 1872.

During the era of the Anti-Socialist Laws (1878–1890), when the SPD was outlawed, Bebel became the party's central figure, guiding it through years of persecution from both within Germany and from exile in Switzerland. He was instrumental in maintaining party unity, purging anarchist influences, and establishing the party's official newspaper, Der Sozialdemokrat. After the repeal of the laws in 1890, Bebel oversaw the SPD's transformation into a mass party, helping to draft its influential Erfurt Program in 1891. In his later years, he defended the party's orthodox Marxist principles against the revisionist theories of Eduard Bernstein while simultaneously pursuing a pragmatic, reformist course in the Reichstag. His work, particularly his influential 1879 book Woman and Socialism, established him as a leading figure in the socialist movement's advocacy for women's rights.

By the time of his death in 1913, Bebel was revered by the German working class and recognized internationally as a major political figure. His funeral in Zurich was a major international event, attended by leaders of the Second International. He left behind a party that had grown into the largest in Germany, and his legacy influenced the course of both West and East German politics in the 20th century.

== Early life and career ==
Ferdinand August Bebel was born on 22 February 1840 in Deutz, a garrison town across the Rhine from Cologne in the Prussian Rhine Province. His father, Johann Gottlob Bebel, was a Prussian non-commissioned officer from the region of Posen, while his mother, Wilhelmina Johanna Simon, was a servant girl and the daughter of a cooper from Wetzlar. The family lived in impoverished conditions in a single room within a fortress casemate. Both of Bebel's parents died of tuberculosis; his father died in 1844, and his mother in 1853. After his father's death, his mother remarried his father's twin brother, Ferdinand August Bebel, who was also a soldier and died of tuberculosis in 1846.

Orphaned at the age of thirteen, Bebel and his brother Julius were left penniless. He was taken into the care of an aunt in Wetzlar, where he completed his elementary schooling (Volksschule) in 1854. Lacking the funds for further education, he began a three-year apprenticeship as a woodturner under a guild master who was a friend of his late mother. The apprenticeship was harsh, involving long hours from early morning until evening with minimal pay and food. In February 1858, he became a journeyman turner and began his travels, working in various towns across southern Germany and Austria, including Heidelberg, Freiburg, Munich, and Salzburg. During his time in Freiburg, he joined a Catholic educational association for journeymen, one of many such clubs that provided moral and cultural guidance. This experience, along with contact with Christian socialist ideas, likely formed the basis for his early progressive thought. His travels ended on 7 May 1860, when he arrived in Leipzig, Saxony. There, he found employment with the master turner Julius Hahn, manufacturing door handles and billiard balls.

== Entry into politics ==
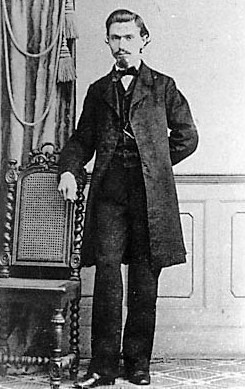
Bebel in 1863

When Bebel arrived in Leipzig in 1860, he was largely ignorant of politics and socialist theory. His initial concerns were personal and economic; he soon organized his fellow journeymen to successfully demand better meals and working conditions from their employer. Saxony's relatively liberal laws and Leipzig's status as a center of publishing and intellectual life provided fertile ground for the politicization of workers. On 19 February 1861, Bebel attended the founding meeting of the Leipzig Arbeiterbildungsverein (Workers' Educational Association), a club promoted by liberal democrats to provide general education to the working class. Initially aligned with the club's conservative, non-political majority, Bebel was elected to its executive committee. As late as 1863, he remained unconvinced of the need for general male suffrage, believing workers were not yet politically mature enough.

The German workers' movement was soon split by the ideas of Ferdinand Lassalle, a charismatic lawyer who advocated for a workers' party independent of the liberal bourgeoisie. In the spring of 1862, a radical faction within the Leipzig association, influenced by Lassalle, demanded that the club adopt a political program centered on achieving universal direct suffrage. Bebel initially opposed this, but the club split, with the radical faction forming their own organization, the Vorwärts club. In May 1863, Lassalle founded the General German Workers' Association (ADAV) in Leipzig. Bebel and his associates in the educational associations, wary of Lassalle's pro-Prussian stance and authoritarian methods, founded a rival organization, the League of German Workers' Associations (VDAV), at a convention in Frankfurt in June 1863. The VDAV, initially guided by liberal-democratic principles, maintained a cultural-educational focus and remained aligned with the progressive bourgeois left.

A decisive turn in Bebel's career came with his association with Wilhelm Liebknecht, a veteran of the 1848 revolutions and a disciple of Karl Marx, who had recently returned to Germany from exile in London. After Lassalle died in a duel in 1864, Liebknecht joined the VDAV and began to steer it toward Marxist principles. Bebel, strongly influenced by Liebknecht's intellect and revolutionary credentials, became his closest ally. After being expelled from Prussia in 1865, Liebknecht moved to Leipzig, where he and Bebel launched a campaign against the Lassalleans and their new leader, Johann Baptist von Schweitzer. By 1866, as many German liberals made peace with the Prussian state and the workers grew more suspicious of their bourgeois mentors, Bebel was converted to the principle of an independent workers' party. Together, Bebel and Liebknecht co-founded the Saxon People's Party in 1866, an anti-Prussian, democratic party that sought to unite working-class and lower-middle-class elements in a broad coalition against Prussian hegemony. In 1867, Bebel was elected as a deputy to the Reichstag of the new North German Confederation for the Glauchau-Meerane district, beginning his long parliamentary career.

== Social Democratic Workers' Party ==
The growing political radicalism of Bebel and Liebknecht culminated in the founding of the Social Democratic Workers' Party of Germany (SDAP) at a congress in Eisenach from 7 to 9 August 1869. The new party, often called the "Eisenachers", was formed by a fusion of the VDAV with breakaway members of the ADAV under the leadership of Bebel and Liebknecht. The Eisenach Program, which Bebel helped draft, was a compromise document that combined Marxist principles, such as affiliation with the First International and the demand for the socialization of the means of production, with some Lassallean and democratic demands, including the establishment of a "free people's state" (freier Volksstaat). Bebel was elected to the party's five-member Central Committee.

=== Franco-Prussian War and treason trial ===
The outbreak of the Franco-Prussian War in July 1870 placed Bebel and Liebknecht in a difficult position. While Marx and the Brunswick committee of the SDAP viewed the initial phase of the war as a legitimate defense of Germany against the aggression of Napoleon III, Bebel's opposition to the war was unwavering from the start. On 21 July 1870, Bebel and Liebknecht abstained from voting for war credits in the Reichstag, a compromise Bebel devised to avoid either supporting the Prussian government or appearing to favor Napoleon. This stance, though unpopular and opposed by the party executive, isolated the party from the wave of national enthusiasm that swept Germany.

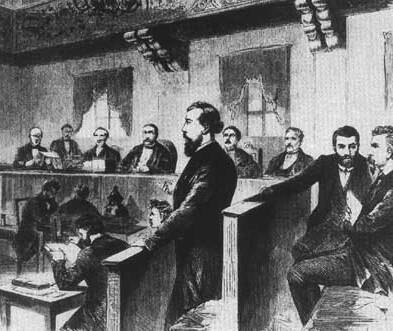
Depiction of Bebel (on far right) at the Leipzig Treason Trial in 1872

After the defeat of Napoleon III at the Battle of Sedan and the proclamation of the Third French Republic, Bebel and Liebknecht argued that the war was no longer defensive and voted against further war credits for the annexation of Alsace-Lorraine. They also expressed solidarity with the Paris Commune in 1871, which Bebel hailed in the Reichstag as a "preliminary skirmish" in the long campaign of the international working class. For their opposition to the war and alleged conspiracy to overthrow the state, Bebel, Liebknecht, and Adolf Hepner were arrested in December 1871 and tried for high treason in Leipzig in March 1872. Bebel used the trial as a platform to defend the principles of the SDAP. He and Liebknecht were convicted and sentenced to two years in a fortress prison (Festungshaft). Bebel served his sentence in Hubertusburg, where he dedicated his time to study, reading works by Marx, Friedrich Engels, Charles Darwin, and others, and writing several pamphlets.

== Unification and Anti-Socialist Laws ==
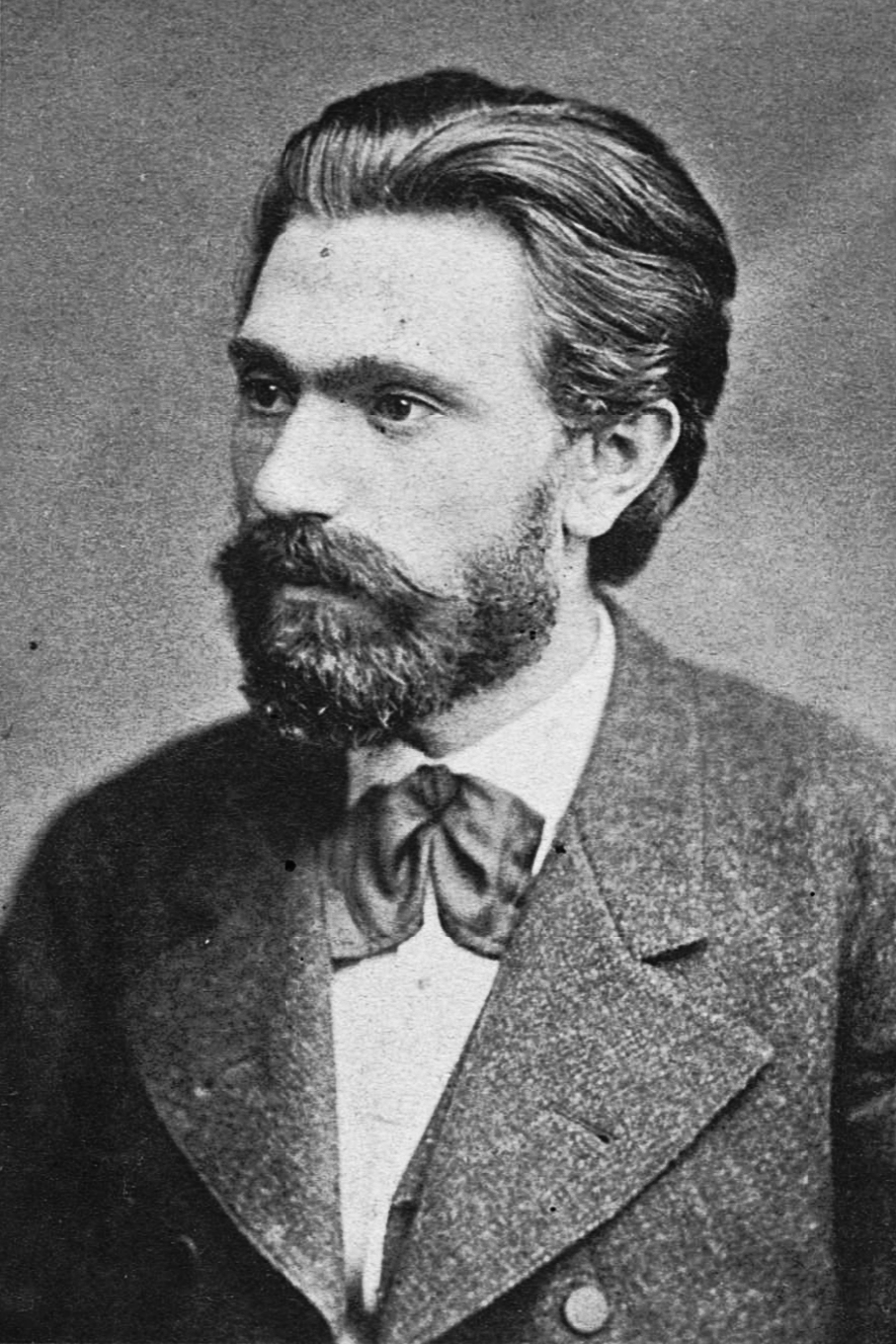
Bebel in the 1870s

The common struggle against the new German Empire brought the Lassalleans (ADAV) and the Eisenachers (SDAP) closer together. In May 1875, the two parties merged at a unity congress in Gotha to form the Socialist Workers' Party of Germany (SAPD). Bebel played a key role in the unification, prioritizing the creation of a single, unified working-class party over doctrinal purity. The resulting Gotha Program was a compromise that incorporated Lassallean concepts such as state-aided cooperatives and the "iron law of wages", which drew a sharp critique from Marx and Engels. Bebel, who had tried but failed to prevent the inclusion of the "iron law", was privately annoyed by the harshness of the critique but remained confident in his ability to steer the new party in a Marxist direction.

In 1878, two failed assassination attempts on Kaiser Wilhelm I by individuals with tenuous connections to socialism provided Chancellor Otto von Bismarck with a pretext to suppress the growing movement. Despite the SAPD's disavowal of the acts, Bismarck pushed the Anti-Socialist Law through the Reichstag in October 1878. The law banned all socialist organizations, meetings, and publications, forcing the party into illegality for the next twelve years. Party newspapers were suppressed, trade unions dissolved, and hundreds of activists arrested or expelled from their hometowns.

During this "heroic era", Bebel emerged as the undisputed leader of the outlawed party. He assumed the duties of party treasurer and became the central organizer of the clandestine movement, maintaining contact with comrades throughout Germany and soliciting funds. The party's leadership was formally transferred to its Reichstag delegation, which remained a legal entity. Bebel used his parliamentary immunity to agitate against the government and maintain the party's public presence. He was instrumental in establishing the party's illegal newspaper, Der Sozialdemokrat, which was smuggled into Germany from Zurich and served as the movement's organizational and ideological center. At the secret party congress at Wyden, Switzerland, in 1880, Bebel successfully led the move to expel the anarchist faction led by Johann Most and Wilhelm Hasselmann, thereby preserving the party's commitment to a political, rather than terrorist, strategy. He formed a major political relationship with Paul Singer, who replaced Liebknecht as Bebel's "right-hand man" in the party leadership from the late 1880s until Singer's death in 1911.

== Leader of the mass party ==
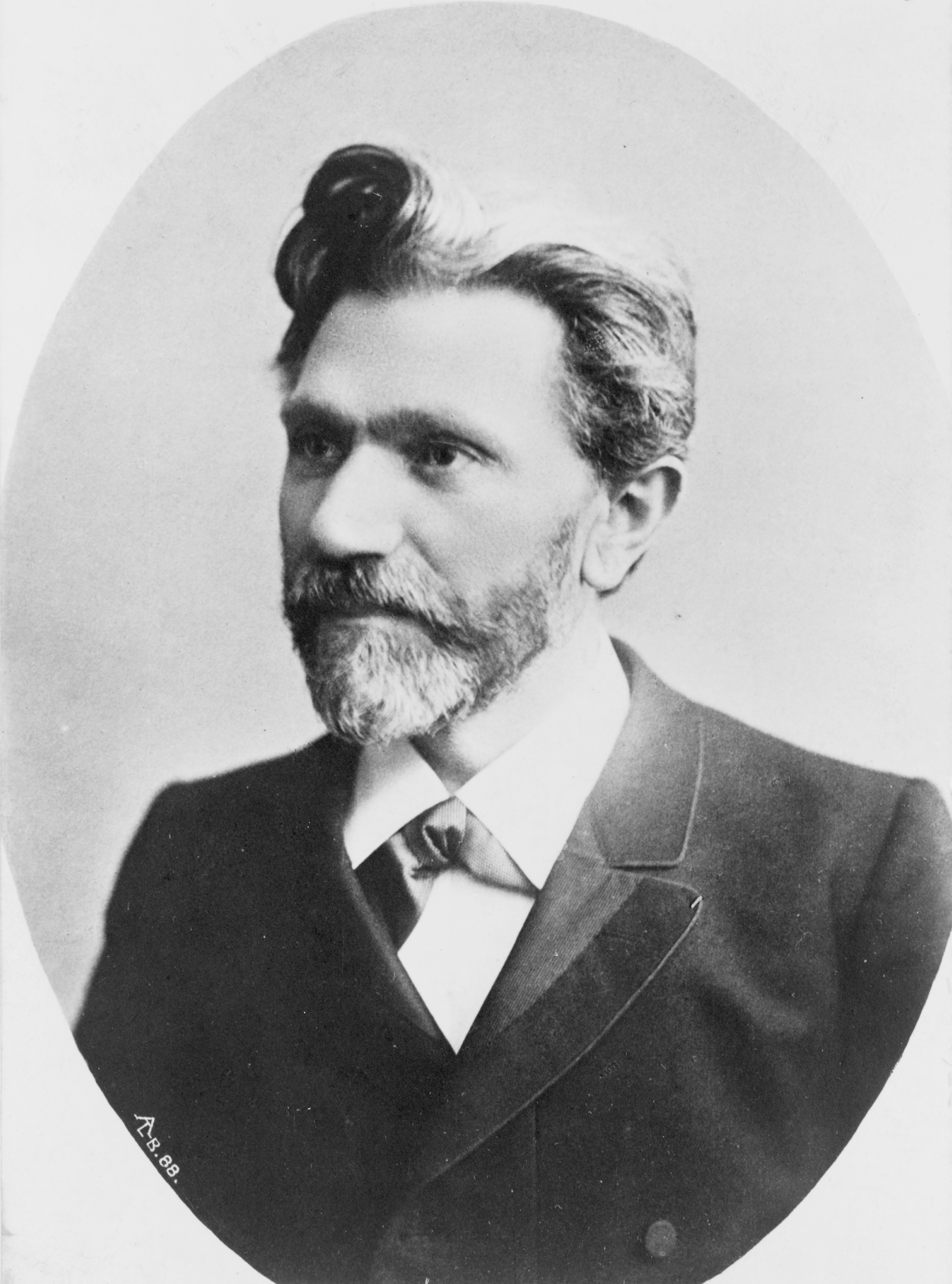
Bebel c.1890

The Anti-Socialist Law lapsed on 30 September 1890. The SAPD emerged from persecution stronger than ever, winning 1.4 million votes and 35 Reichstag seats in the February 1890 election, a triumph that contributed to Bismarck's dismissal by the new emperor, Wilhelm II. Bebel now led the work of reorganizing the party on a legal basis. At the Halle Congress in 1890, the party was renamed the Social Democratic Party of Germany (SPD), and a new, decentralized organizational structure was adopted to navigate the remaining restrictive state laws.

At the Erfurt Congress in 1891, the party adopted a new program drafted primarily by Karl Kautsky and Eduard Bernstein. The Erfurt Program was a thoroughly Marxist document, affirming the inevitability of the collapse of capitalism and the necessity of the working class conquering political power. Bebel defended the program, which became a model for socialist parties across Europe. During the 1890s, Bebel consolidated his leadership against challenges from both the left and the right. He defeated the radical Jungen ("Youths"), who criticized the party's parliamentary focus, and began to confront the growing influence of reformist tendencies, particularly from the South German party organizations led by Georg von Vollmar. At the 1895 Breslau party congress, Bebel suffered a rare defeat when his support for an agrarian program designed to attract peasant voters was overwhelmingly rejected in favor of a resolution from Kautsky and Clara Zetkin that defended the party's strict proletarian purity.

In 1898, following efforts by Magnus Hirschfeld and the Scientific-Humanitarian Committee, Bebel took a petition to end Paragraph 175 of the German Criminal Code, which illegalized homosexual acts, to the Reichstag and urged colleagues to add their names to it. On 13 January 1898, in an open session of the german federal parliament, Bebel became the first known politician to openly support homosexual emancipation.

The most significant internal challenge came from the rise of Revisionism, a theoretical movement initiated by Eduard Bernstein. In a series of articles beginning in 1896 and his 1899 book The Preconditions of Socialism, Bernstein challenged fundamental tenets of Marxism, arguing that capitalism was not collapsing but adapting, and that the SPD should abandon its revolutionary goals in favor of a gradualist, reformist path to socialism. Bebel led the orthodox Marxist counter-attack. While privately acknowledging the need for practical reforms, he insisted that the party's revolutionary goal—the Kladderadatsch, or great collapse of capitalism—was essential for its identity and unity. With constant goading from Bebel, Kautsky became the chief theoretical opponent of revisionism. At successive party congresses, most notably at Hanover (1899) and Dresden (1903), Bebel marshaled the party majority to condemn Revisionism in principle, while avoiding an open split by allowing revisionists to remain in the party. At the Dresden congress, Bebel used all his influence to line up delegates behind the party leadership's grand condemnation of revisionism, cementing a temporary alliance between the party executive and the radicals.

== Later years and final debates ==
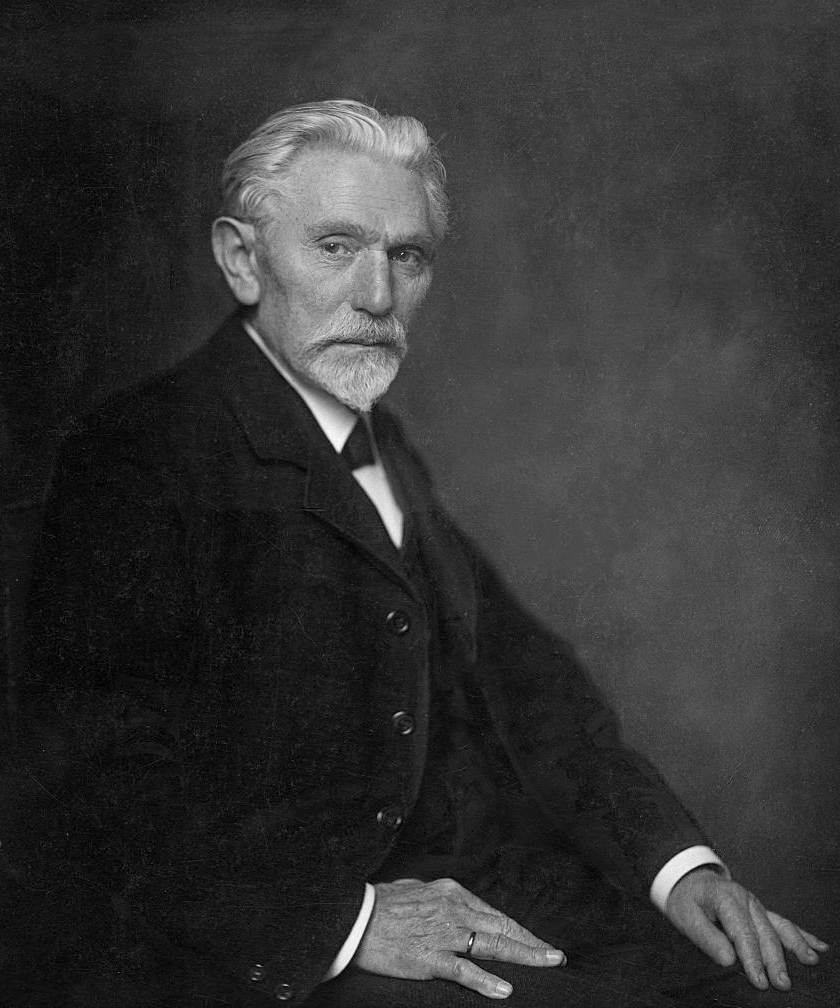
Bebel c. 1910

In the last decade of his life, Bebel's attention was increasingly consumed by internal party struggles and the growing threats of militarism and war. The Russian Revolution of 1905 sparked a major debate within the SPD over the use of the political mass strike. While the party's radical wing, led by Rosa Luxemburg, saw it as a crucial revolutionary weapon, the trade union leaders were strongly opposed. At the Jena Congress in 1905, in a marathon three-and-a-half-hour address, Bebel engineered a compromise. He framed the revolution as a defensive act and recommended the mass strike primarily as a defensive weapon to protect existing rights, such as universal suffrage, rather than as a tool for revolutionary change. At the Mannheim Congress in 1906, under pressure from the powerful trade unions, Bebel performed a "masterpiece of rhetoric and leadership" by executing a tactical retreat. He shepherded through the Mannheim Agreement, which established formal parity between the party and the unions, and effectively gave the union leadership a veto over any future use of the mass strike.

Bebel's foreign policy views were dominated by a deep-seated Russophobia and a growing concern for Germany's diplomatic isolation. He viewed Tsarist Russia as the primary threat to European peace and the German workers' movement. While consistently opposing German militarism and naval expansion as a threat to peace with Britain, he repeatedly affirmed that the SPD would defend the fatherland in a war against Russian aggression. He took a hard line against radical anti-militarism within the party, raising Karl Liebknecht's proposal for an anti-militarist youth campaign to an issue of confidence at the Mannheim congress and mocking comparisons with the Belgian and French socialists as irrelevant. At the 1907 Essen Congress, during the "Noske debates" on the party's response to its recent electoral defeat, Bebel argued that the party sought to democratize the army not to weaken it, but to strengthen national defense, even advocating for compulsory pre-military training for youth. This patriotic stance marked a significant step in the party's integration into the national state and foreshadowed the SPD's position in 1914.

Bebel's health, never robust, declined sharply in his final years. He suffered from heart disease and recurring bronchial problems. The death of his wife Julie from cancer in November 1910 was a severe blow, followed by the death of his son-in-law Ferdinand Simon and the mental breakdown of his daughter Frieda in 1912. Despite his failing health, he remained the party's paramount leader, proposing Hugo Haase to succeed the late Paul Singer as co-chairman in 1911. In 1912, the SPD won a massive electoral victory, capturing 110 seats to become the largest party in the Reichstag. Bebel, who was absent during the negotiations, had "serious worries" about the secret electoral pact with the Progressive Party that helped secure the victory. In his final major parliamentary intervention, Bebel supported the government's military budget of 1913 on the condition that it be financed by a direct property tax, a decision that marked a break with the party's traditional policy of rejecting all military budgets and foreshadowed the vote for war credits in 1914.

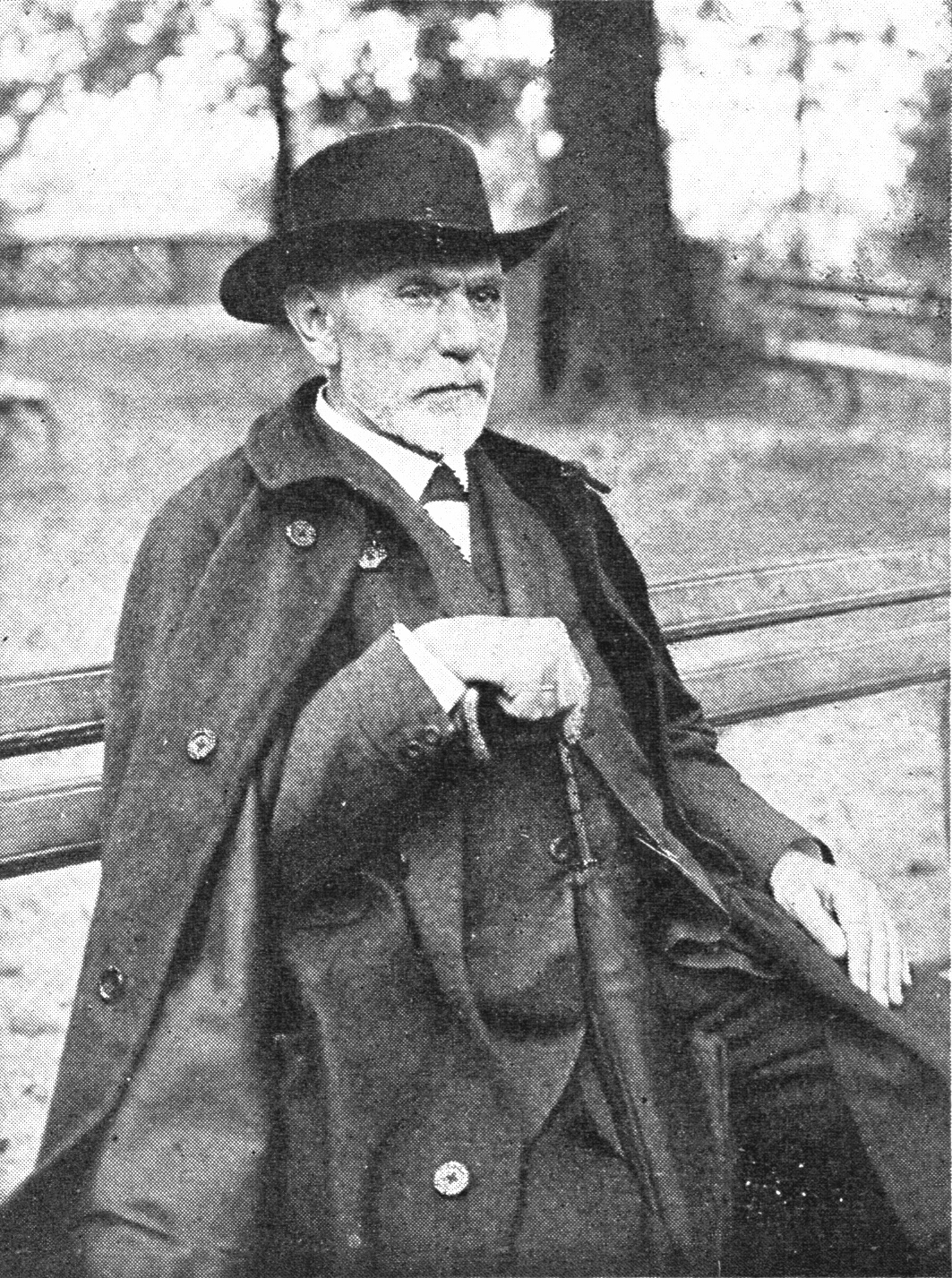
Bebel in 1913

Bebel died of a heart attack on 13 August 1913, while visiting a sanatorium in Passug, Switzerland. His body was taken to Zurich, which he had chosen as his second home. His funeral was a massive international event, attended by tens of thousands of workers and socialist leaders from across Europe, including Jean Jaurès and Victor Adler. His ashes were interred next to those of his wife in Zurich.

== Personal life ==
In 1866, Bebel married Johanna Carolina Henrietta Otto, known as Julie, a milliner and the daughter of a railroad worker. Their marriage was described as happy and supportive, with Julie providing Bebel with political and economic advice throughout his career. They had one child, a daughter named Bertha Friederika (1869–1948), called Frieda. Frieda married Dr. Ferdinand Simon, a physician and socialist from Breslau, with whom Bebel maintained a close relationship.

Bebel began his career as a self-employed master turner in Leipzig in 1864. His business initially struggled due to his political activities, which repelled middle-class customers, and his imprisonment in 1872 nearly led to bankruptcy. In the late 1870s, he took on a business partner, Ferdinand Issleib, who put the enterprise on a firm financial footing. Later in life, royalties from his highly successful book Woman and Socialism, combined with a substantial inheritance from a political admirer in 1903, made him a wealthy man.

== Legacy ==
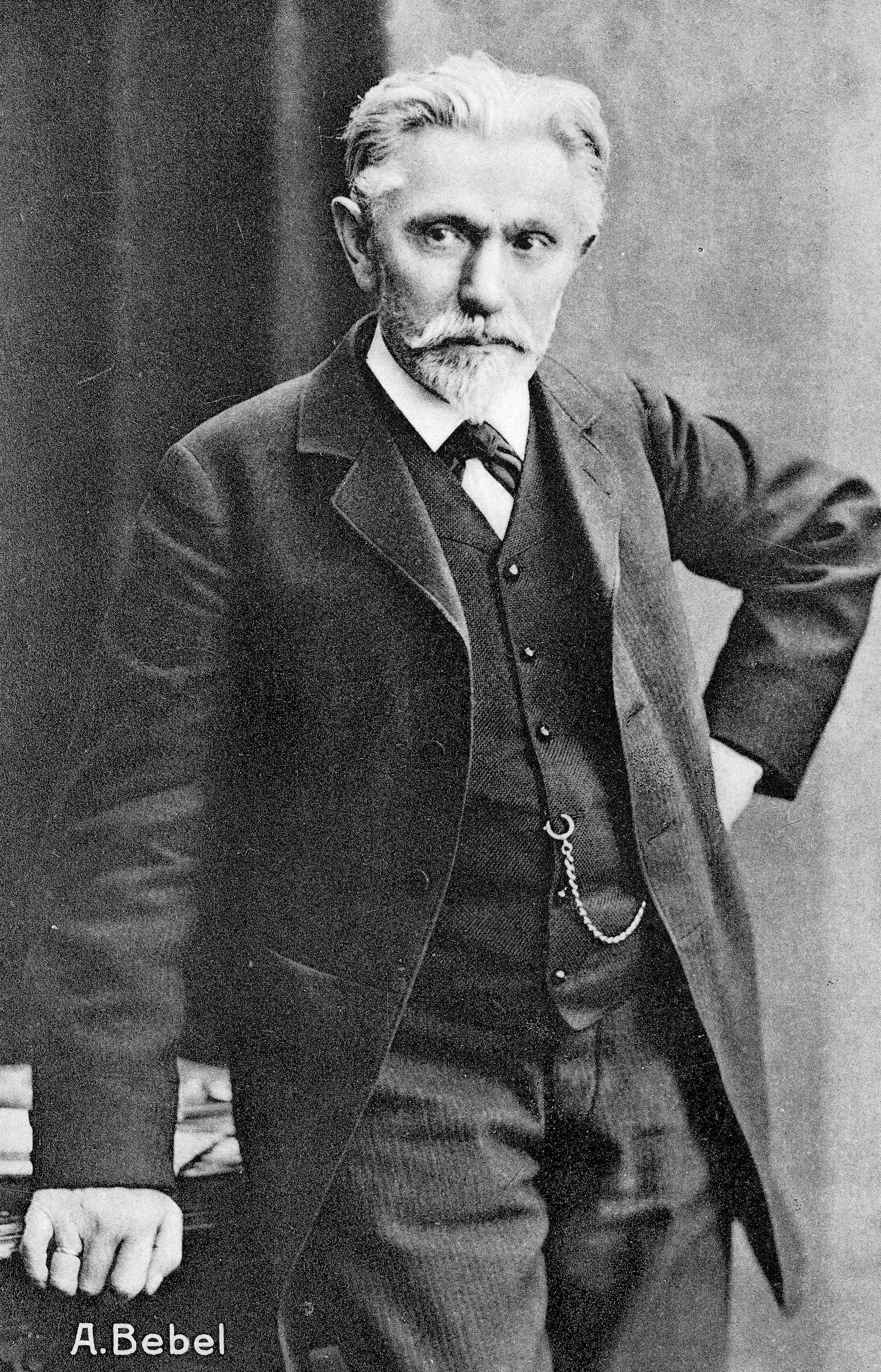
Bebel c.1910

August Bebel was the most important leader of the German Social Democratic movement for nearly half a century. More than any other figure, he embodied the party's identity and was revered by the working-class masses as their "shadow emperor" (Schattenkaiser). He was a powerful orator, a master politician who dominated party congresses, and a pragmatic tactician who successfully guided the SPD from a small sect into the largest political party in Germany. While remaining personally committed to the revolutionary goals of Marxism, his practical work in the Reichstag laid the groundwork for the SPD's evolution into a reformist party. Both the Social Democratic Party of the Federal Republic of Germany and the Socialist Unity Party of the German Democratic Republic later claimed him as a forefather. Historian William Harvey Maehl concludes that Bebel, as a paradigm for both major German socialist movements, ultimately had "a more lasting and ubiquitous influence upon Germany than even Bismarck had".

Bebel was also a prolific writer. His most famous work, Woman and Socialism (Die Frau und der Sozialismus), published in 1879, was a groundbreaking analysis of the oppression of women from a Marxist perspective. It went through more than fifty editions by 1914, was translated into numerous languages, and became one of the most widely read socialist texts of its time, establishing Bebel as a central figure in the socialist feminist movement. His multi-volume autobiography, Aus meinem Leben (From My Life), is a major source for the history of the German socialist movement.

He is also credited for coining the aphorism "Antisemitism is the socialism of fools" which he did in an interview with Hermann Bahr, however he was summarizing a similar statement by Ferdinand Kronawetter, "Antisemitism is nothing but the socialism the idiot of Vienna", a reference to Vienna's mayor at the time, Karl Lueger.

== Selected works ==
- Women in the Past, Present, and Future. London: Reeves, 1885. US Edition: San Francisco: G. Benham, 1897.
- Assassinations and Socialism: From a Speech by August Bebel, Delivered at Berlin, November 2, 1898. New York: New York Labor News Co., n.d. [c. 1899].
- Beber. New York: International Publishers, 1901.
- Socialism and the German Kaiser: Two Speeches. With Georg Heinrich von Vollmar. London: Clarion Press, 1903.
- Women Under Socialism. New York: New York Labor News Co., 1904. New translation: Women and Socialism. New York: Socialist Literature Co., 1910.
- Trade Unions and Political Parties. Milwaukee: Social-Democratic Publishing Co., 1906.
- Bebel's Reminiscences. New York: Socialist Literature Co., 1911.
- The Intellectual Ability of Women. New York: Cooperative Press, n.d. [c. 1912].
- My Life. London: T. Fisher Unwin, 1912.
- Speeches of August Bebel. New York: International Publishers, 1928.
- Society of the Future. Moscow: Progress Publishers. 1976 (an abridged translation of the last part of Bebel's Women and Socialism).

== See also ==
- Bebelplatz, public square in Berlin named after August Bebel
