= Alwin Gerisch =

German politician (1857–1922)

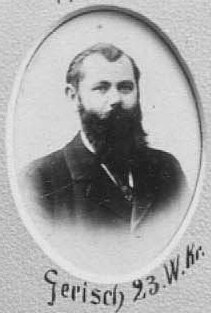
Gerisch in 1903

Karl Alwin Gerisch (14 March 1857 – 8 August 1922) was a German politician of the Social Democratic Party of Germany. He was joint party chairman from 1890 to 1892 with Paul Singer, and from 1894 to 1898 and again from 1903 to 1906 a member of the Reichstag.

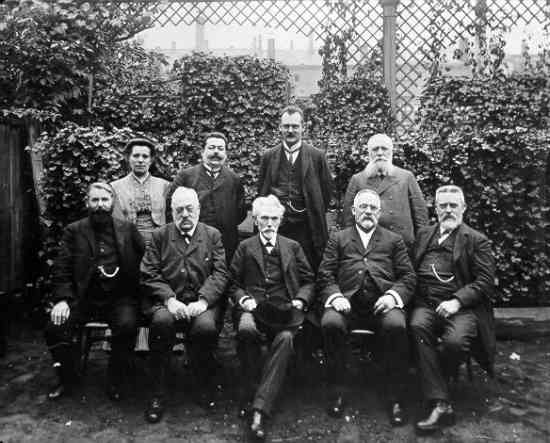
SPD party executive in 1909. Back row: Luise Zietz, Friedrich Ebert, Hermann Müller, Robert Wengels. Front row: Alwin Gerisch, Paul Singer, August Bebel, Wilhelm Pfannkuch, Hermann Molkenbuhr
