= Der Sozialdemokrat =

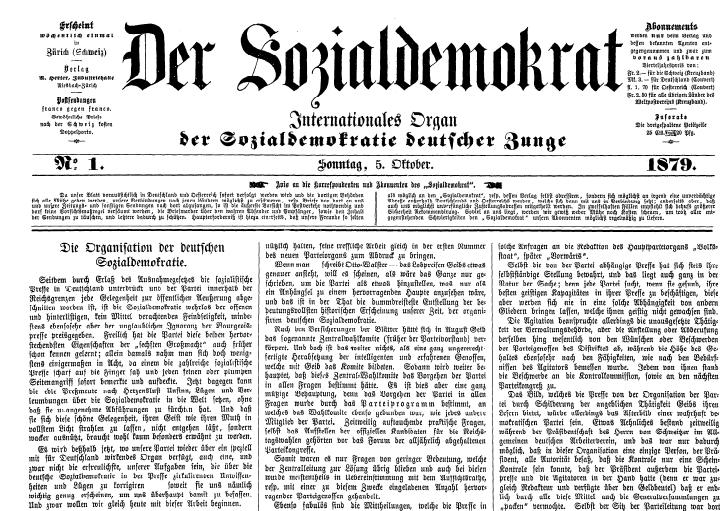
- Founder: Johann Baptist von Schweitzer
- Founded: 1879
- Ceased publication: 1890
- Language: German
- City: Zurich, London
- Country: Switzerland, England

Der Sozialdemokrat (The Social Democrat) was a German socialist publication. It was founded by Johann Baptist von Schweitzer. The first issue was published in Zurich in September 1879.

Due to the Anti-Socialist Laws, the publication had to be distributed illegally into Germany. It was printed in London from 1887. It became defunct in 1890.
