= History of the Social Democratic Party of Germany =

Aspect of German political history

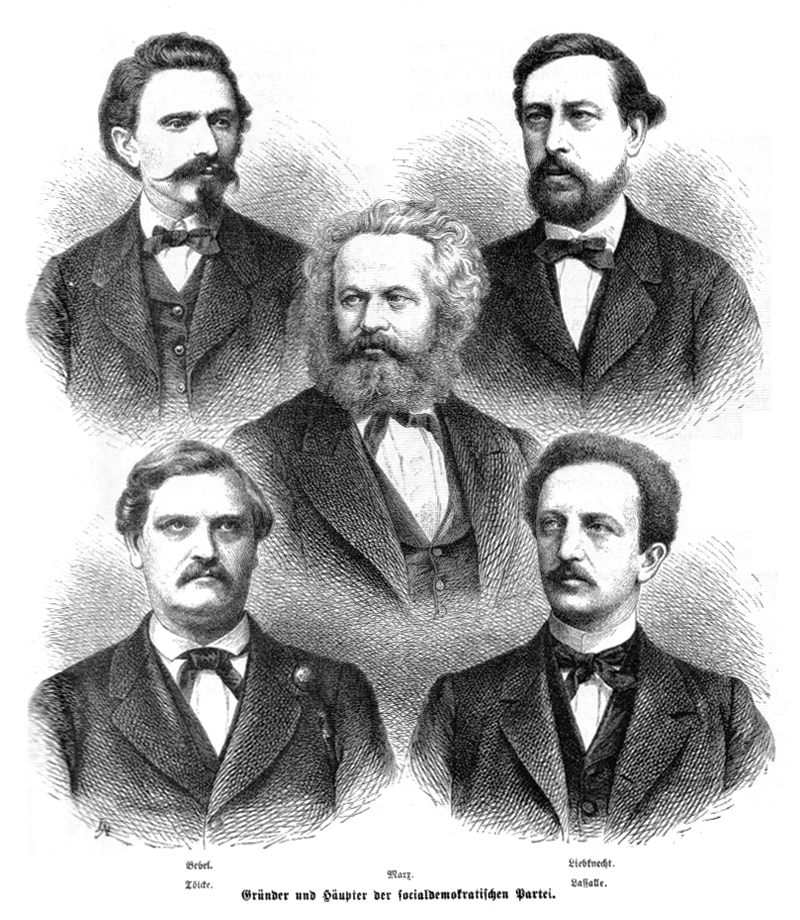
Protagonists of the political party organized early German workers' movement (Top row: August Bebel and Wilhelm Liebknecht for the SDAP - Middle: Karl Marx as an ideal pulse Bottom row: Carl Wilhelm Tölcke, Ferdinand Lassalle for ADAV)

The foundation of the Social Democratic Party of Germany (German: Sozialdemokratische Partei Deutschlands, SPD) can be traced back to the 1860s, and it has represented the centre-left in German politics for much of the 20th and 21st centuries. From 1891 to 1959, the SPD theoretically espoused Marxism.

The SPD has been the ruling party at several points, first under Friedrich Ebert and Philipp Scheidemann in 1918. The party was outlawed in Nazi Germany but returned to government in 1969 with Willy Brandt. Meanwhile, the East German branch of the SPD was merged with the ruling Socialist Unity Party of Germany. In the modern Federal Republic of Germany, the SPD's main rival has historically been the centre-right Christian Democratic Union. As of May 2025 the SPD serves in a coalition government with the CDU, with Friedrich Merz (CDU) as chancellor and Lars Klingbeil (SPD) as vice-chancellor.

== German Reich ==
=== Before Unification (1861–1875) ===
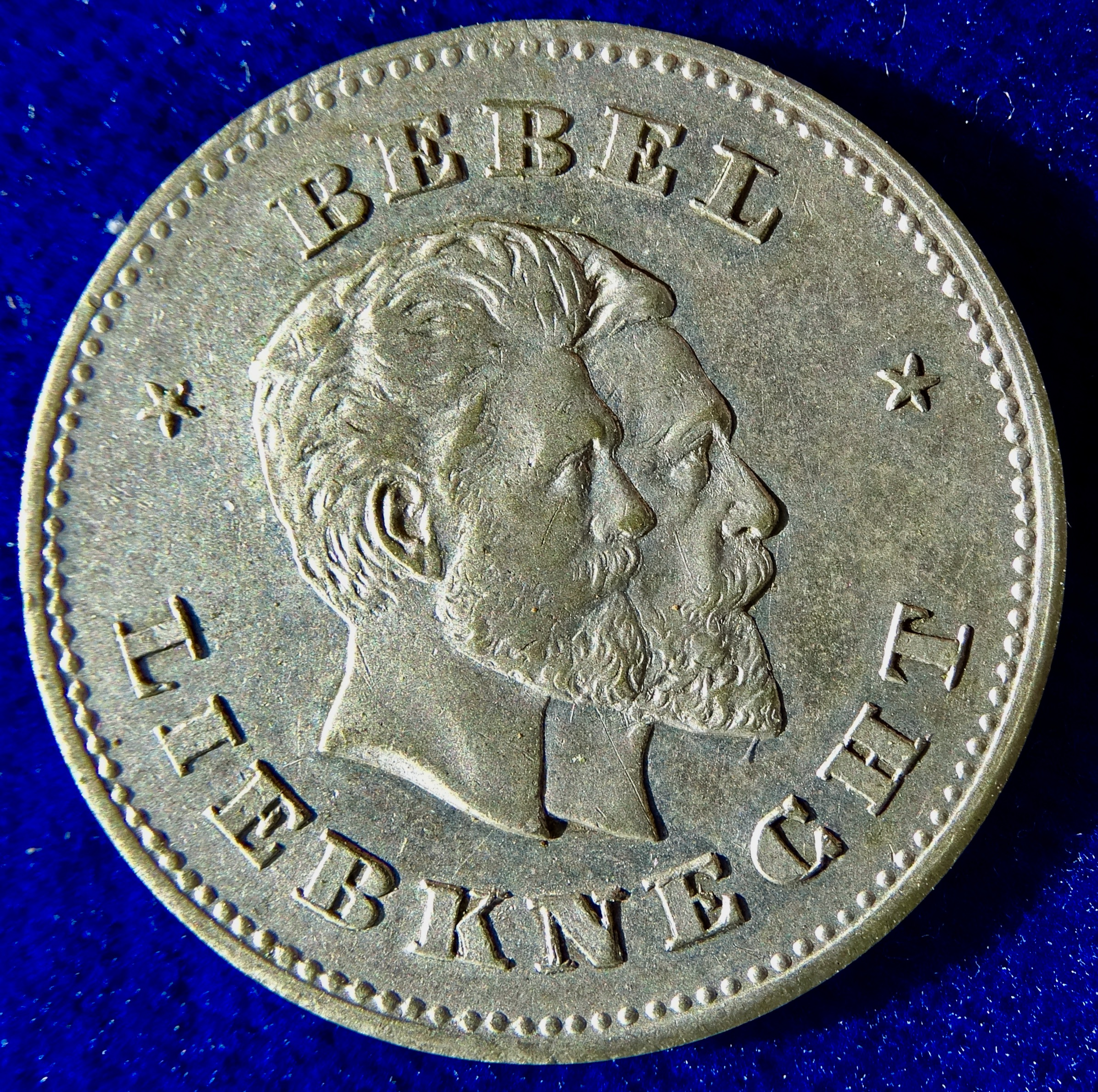
Medal 1890 Bebel and Liebknecht after their success in the federal elections

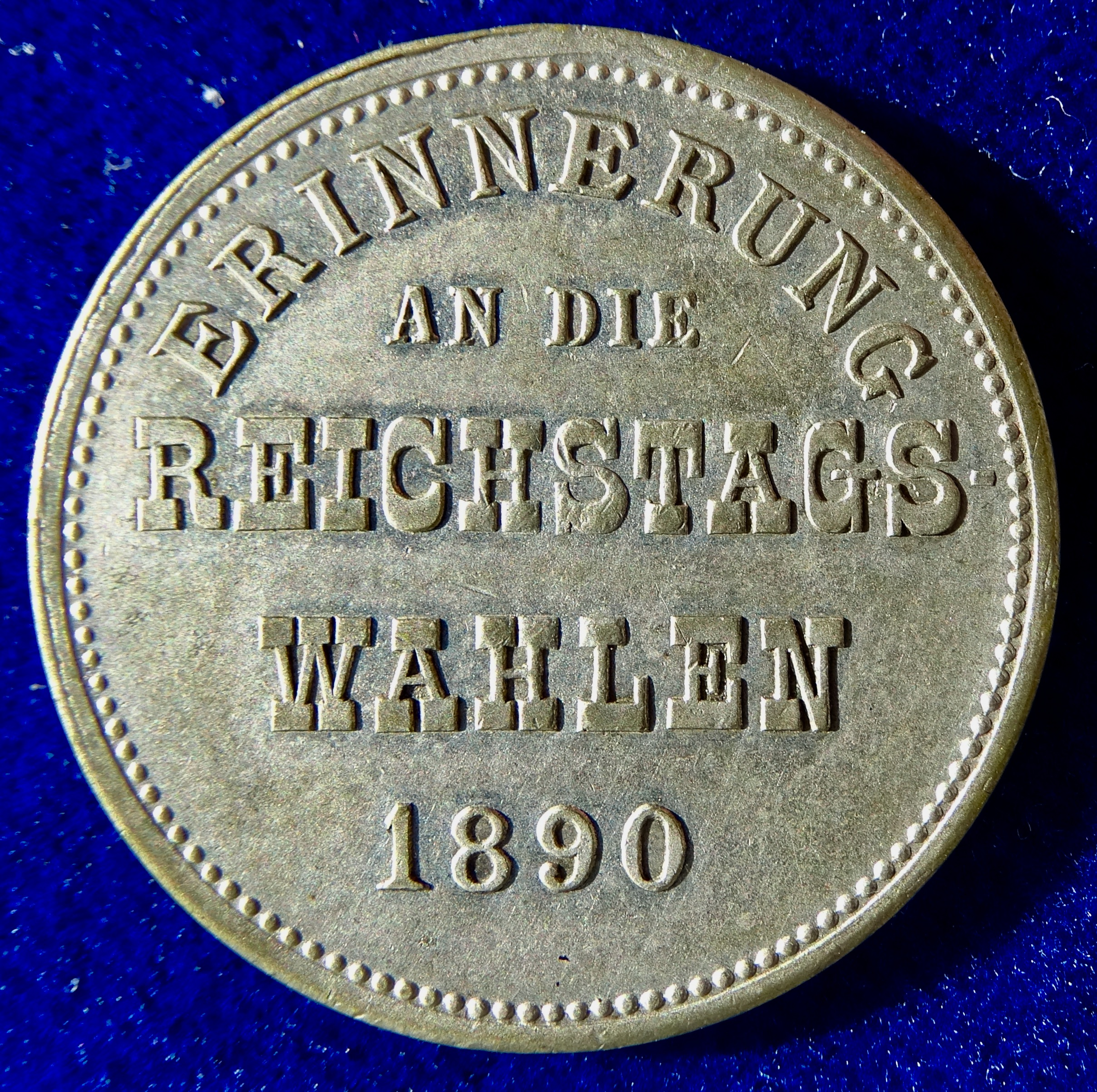
The reverse of that medal commemorating the 1890 Reichstagswahl

While Social Democratic tradition held that the movement was founded by Ferdinand Lassalle in 1863, modern historians argue that it developed out of workers' educational associations (Arbeiterbildungsvereine) of the 1860s.

These educational associations were initially the effort of multiple classes, including artisan workers, liberal intellectuals, and industrialists. One such society received funding from the Grand Duke of Baden, a Prussian noble. The associations were initially non-political, aiming to educate the poorer classes, though some participants advocated for a political orientation as early as 1861. August Bebel, a turner who would eventually lead the movement, first attended in 1861.

In 1863, Lassalle split alongside a minority to form the first independent workers’ party, the Allgemeiner Deutscher Arbeiterverein (ADAV, General German Workers' Association). The new party advocated for direct manhood suffrage, and Lassalle's theory of the "iron law of wages." Wilhelm Liebknecht, a veteran of the Revolutions of 1848 and an associate of Karl Marx and Friedrich Engels, first joined the ADAV but, failing to win supporters to his position on the German question, entered the educational societies.

Lassalle's split reverberated within the remaining educational associations. Less than a month after the foundation of the Lassallean party, the educational societies centralized into the Verband deutscher Arbeiter-und Bildungsvereine (VDAV, Union of German Workmen's and Educational Societies). In 1865, the national leadership unanimously adopted the political struggle for general, equal, direct, and secret suffrage.

Lassalle died unexpectedly in a duel in 1864, precipitating a succession crisis in his party. Jean Baptista von Schweitzer took the leadership of the ADAV, and the Countess Sophie von Hatzfeldt formed a less successful splinter group, the Lassallescher Allgemeiner Deutscher Arbeiterverein (LADAV, Lassallean General German Workers' Association).

In the leadup to the Austro-Prussian War, the German question was a major point of dispute between the Lassalleans and others in the movement. The Lassallean party advocated independence from and refusal to collaborate with the liberal middle class, and for a Prussian-led "lesser" unification of Germany. By contrast, Marx, who at this time maintained contact with the movement through Liebknecht, advocated independence from and temporary, tactical collaboration with the liberal-democratic movement against the Prussian nobility. Liebknecht and Bebel would eventually support a "greater" German republic, united with Austria by a people's militia. When war broke out, the educational associations took an anti-Prussian position compatible with that of Marx as opposed to the Lassalleans.

Upon Prussia's victory against Austria, August Bebel and Wilhelm Liebknecht founded the Sächsische Volkspartei (Saxon People's Party), a branch of the middle-class Deutsche Volkspartei (German People's Party), advocating a democratic “greater" Germany, the abolition of both feudal privileges and internal workers' passports. Bebel was elected in the February 1867 North German federal election to the Reichstag of the newly-formed, Prussian-dominated North German Confederation in 1867 as a member of the Saxon People's Party. That following August, Liebknecht won a mandate as well.

Bebel was elected president of the VDAV 1867, and in 1868 he and his associates split the organization from its original liberal benefactors by proposing adoption of the program of the International Workingmen's Association, later known as the First International. In 1869, Bebel's supporters, alongside some former members of the Lassallean party, gathered in Eisenach and folded the VDAV and Saxon People's Party into the Sozialdemokratische Arbeiterpartei (SDAP, Social Democratic Workers' Party of Germany), also known as the "Eisenachers".

=== Unification, Illegality, and Legality (1875-1919) ===
Bebel and Liebknecht's SDAP merged with the Lassallean ADAV at a conference held in Gotha in 1875, taking the name Sozialistische Arbeiterpartei Deutschlands (SAP, Socialist Workers' Party of Germany). At this conference, the party developed the Gotha Program, which Karl Marx criticized in his Critique of the Gotha Program. Through the Anti-Socialist Laws, Otto von Bismarck had the party outlawed for its pro-revolution, anti-monarchy sentiments in 1878; but in 1890 it was legalized again after the successful elections to the Reichstag. That year, in its Halle convention, it changed its name to Sozialdemokratische Partei Deutschlands (SPD), as it is known to this day.

Anti-socialist campaigns were counterproductive. 1878 to 1890 was the SPD's "heroic period". The party's new program drawn up in 1891 at Halle was more radical than 1875's Gotha program. From 1881 to 1890 the party's support increased faster than in any other period. In 1896, the National Liberals and Conservatives in Saxony replaced the democratic vote with a Prussian-style three-tiered suffrage, upper class votes counting the most. They did this to drive out the local SPD which lost its last seat in 1901. However, in the 1903 election, the number of socialist deputies increased from 11 to 22 out of 23.

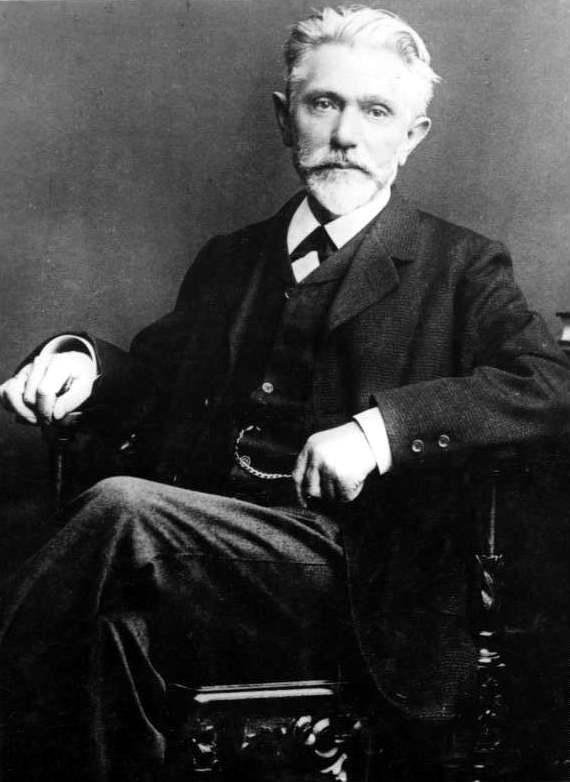
August Bebel in 1863, co-chairman from 1892 to 1913

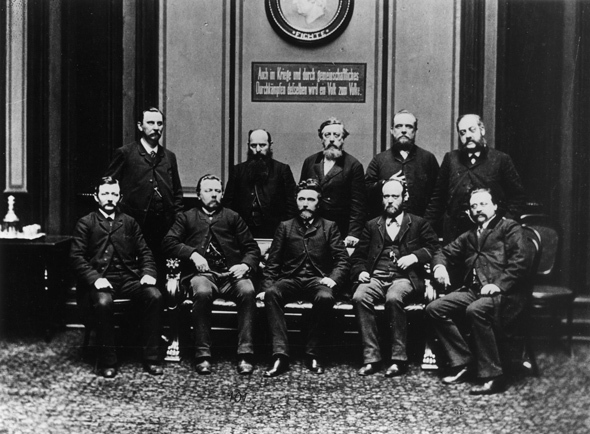
SPD members in Reichstag 1889, (sitting from left to right: Georg Schumacher, Friedrich Harm, August Bebel, Heinrich Meister and Karl Frohme. Standing: Johann Heinrich Wilhelm Dietz, August Kühn, Wilhelm Liebknecht, Karl Grillenberger, and Paul Singer)

Because Social Democrats could be elected as list-free candidates while the party was outlawed, SPD continued to be a growing force in the Reichstag, becoming the strongest party in 1912 (in the German Empire, the parliamentary balance of forces had no influence on the formation of the cabinet). During this period, SPD deputies in the Reichstag were able to win some improvements in working and living conditions for working-class Germans, thereby advancing the cause of its policies in a general way and securing material benefits for its supporters. As noted by one study, “the SPD played a vital role in the Reichstag’s deliberations to establish an extensive factory inspection system, as well as wide-ranging housing and health regulations.”

In the Landtag, the SPD was able to extract some concessions from time to time in areas for which the assembly was responsible, such as education and social policy. In Hesse, for example, the party was successful in demanding that church tax be listed separately in assessments, and it was able to secure improvements in judicial procedure. The SPD also had occasional successes in raising wages and improving the working conditions of municipal labourers.

SPD pressure in the Reichstag in the late nineteenth century supported an expansion in the system of factory inspection, together with a minor reform in military service under which the families of reservists, called up for training or manoeuvres, could receive an allowance. In the 1880s, SPD deputies in Saxony successfully agitated in support of improved safety for miners and better control of mines. In Bavaria after 1894 and Baden and Hesse after 1891, the SPD cooperated with bourgeois parties in state parliaments.

In 1908, the same year the government legalized women's participation in politics, Luise Zietz became the first woman appointed to the executive committee of the SPD.

Despite the passage of anti-socialist legislation, the SPD continued to grow in strength in the early twentieth century, with a steady rise in membership from 384,327 in 1905/06 to 1,085,905 in 1913/14. SPD was seen as a populist party, and people from every quarter of German society sought help and advice from it. With its counseling service (provided free of charge by the mostly trade union maintained workers' secretarial offices), the German social democratic movement helped large numbers of Germans to secure their legal rights, primarily in social security. There also existed a dynamic educational movement, with hundreds of courses and individual lectures, theatre performances, libraries, peripatetic teachers, a central school for workers' education, and a famous Party School, as noted by the historians Susanne Miller and Heinrich Potthoff:

With all of this, the SPD and the Free Trade Unions were not only delivering the necessary tools for the political and social struggle, but were also a cultural movement in the widest sense of the term.

Growth in strength did not initially translate into larger numbers in the Reichstag. The original constituencies had been drawn at the empire's formation in 1871, when Germany was almost two-thirds rural. They were never redrawn to reflect the dramatic growth of Germany's cities in the 1890s. By the turn of the century, the urban-rural ratio was reversed, and almost two-thirds of all Germans lived in cities and towns. Even with this change, the party still managed to become the largest single faction in the Reichstag at the 1912 elections. It would be the largest party in Germany for the next two decades.

In the states of Bavaria, Württemberg, Hesse, and Baden, the SPD was successful in extracting various socio-political and democratic concessions (including the replacement of the class-based electoral systems with universal suffrage) through electoral alliances with bourgeois parties, voting for parliamentary bills and state budgets. In the Reichstag, the SPD resorted to a policy of tactical compromise in order to exert direct influence on legislation. In 1894, the parliamentary SPD voted for a government bill for the first time ever. It reduced the import duty on wheat, which led to a reduction in the price of food. In 1913, the votes of SPD parliamentarians helped to bring in new tax laws affecting the wealthy, which were necessary due to the increase in military spending.

As Sally Waller wrote, the SPD encouraged great loyalty from its members by organising educational courses, choral societies, sports clubs, and libraries. The party also ran welfare clinics, founded libraries, produced newspapers, and organised holidays, rallies, and festivals. As also noted by Weller, they played a role in shaping a number of progressive reforms:

The SPD also helped promote Germany's extensive system of welfare support giving Germany the most comprehensive system of social insurance in Europe by 1913. They pressed successfully for some constitutional changes like the secret ballot (1904) and payment of MPs (1906), which permitted lower middle and working-class men, with no other income, to put themselves forward as deputies for the Reichstag. In 1911, they supported measures whereby Alsace-Lorraine was given Reichstag representation and universal male suffrage at 21 years was introduced. They also successfully resisted the taxation proposals that would hit the working man harder and promoted progressive taxes, whereby those with the most would be forced to pay more.

The influence of the SPD on policymaking was noted by one socialist politician, who told the leading American liberal politician William Jennings Bryan that

the socialists of Germany have organized a liberal party of unrivaled strength; they have educated the working classes to a very high standard of political intelligence and to a strong sense of their independence and of their social mission, as the living and progressive force in every social respect; they have promoted the organization of trade unions; and have by their incessant agitation compelled the other parties and the government to take up social and labor legislation.

Another study has noted the positive influence that the SPD had on social reform legislation in the Reichstag by the early Twentieth Century, quoting one observer as such:

Summing up the positive achievements of Social Democratic politics in the German Diet, Herman Molkenbuhr claims some direct Socialist victories in all the domains of parliamentary legislation dealing with workingmen's insurance, factory laws, industrial courts, the civil code, protective tariff and taxation. Taking the existing German law on accident insurance as an illustration, he shows, by an elaborate analysis of the origin of its various provisions, that no less than twelve of its most substantial amendments have been adopted on motion of the Social Democratic party, while the party of the center, which habitually poses as the champion of the working class, has only two of such amendments to its credit, the party of the government and the liberal union each one, the other parties having contributed nothing at all to the amelioration of this important law.”

According to historian Richard M. Watt:

The political and organizational success of the Social Democrats had enabled them to demand and obtain a respectable body of legislation incorporating social reform, outlawing child labor and improving working conditions and wages, to the point where the German Social Democratic Party was the model for socialist parties in every other nation, and the German worker the most envied in Continental Europe.

Social Democratic unions were also increasingly successful in bringing out the start (as noted by one study) “of a collective wage bargaining system in Imperial Germany which covered approximately 2 million workers by 1913.”

The Social Democrats also played an indirect part in the social legislation introduced during the chancellorship of Otto Von Bismarck, which was partly carried out in response to the apparent threat they posed. As Bismarck noted while addressing Parliament on the 26th of November 1884: “Were it not for Social Democracy and the fact that many people are afraid of it, the modest advances in social reform that we have hitherto made would not have been achieved.”

==== Erfurt Program and revisionism (1891–1899) ====
As a reaction to government prosecution, the Erfurt Program of 1891 was more radical than the Gotha Program of 1875, demanding nationalization of Germany's major industries. In fact, in 1891, the party officially became a Marxist Party to the gratification of the aging Engels. However, the party began to move away from revolutionary socialism at the turn of the 20th century. Eduard Bernstein authored a series of articles on the Problems of Socialism between 1896 and 1898, and later a book, Die Voraussetzungen des Sozialismus und die Aufgaben der Sozialdemokratie ("The Prerequisites for Socialism and the Tasks of Social Democracy"), published in 1899, in which he argued that the winning of reforms under capitalism would be enough to bring about socialism. Radical party activist Rosa Luxemburg accused Bernstein of revisionism and argued against his ideas in her pamphlet Social Reform or Revolution, and Bernstein's program was not adopted by the party.

Programs of the Social Democratic Party of Germany
Year	Program name	Brief description
1869	Eisenach Program	Founding program of the SDAP
1875	Gotha Program	Unification of SDAP and ADAV
1891	Erfurt Program	Classical Marxist program
1921	Görlitz Program	Strongly revisionist program of the MSPD
1925	Heidelberg Program	Orientation towards United States of Europe
1959	Godesberg Program	People's party of democratic socialism
1989	Berlin Program	Ecological renewal of industrial society
2007	Hamburg Program	Current programme of the SPD

==== First World War (1912–1917) ====
Conservative elites nevertheless became alarmed at SPD growth—especially after it won 35% of the national vote in the 1912 German federal election. Some elites looked to a foreign war as a solution to Germany's internal problems. SPD policy limited antimilitarism to aggressive wars—Germans saw 1914 as a defensive war. On 25 July 1914, the SPD leadership appealed to its membership to demonstrate for peace and large numbers turned out in orderly demonstrations. The SPD was not revolutionary and many members were nationalistic. When the war began, some conservatives wanted to use force to suppress the SPD, but Chancellor Bethmann-Hollweg refused. However, the increasing loyalty of the party establishment towards Emperor and Reich, coupled with its antipathy toward Russia led the party under Bebel's successor Friedrich Ebert to support the war. This was helped by the fact that Germany had waited until after the Russian Empire announced mobilization to begin its own mobilization, allowing Germany to claim it was the victim of Russian aggression. The SPD members of the Reichstag voted 96–14 on 3 August 1914 to support the war. They next voted the money for the war, but resisted demands for an aggressive peace policy that would involve takeover of new territories Even if socialists felt beleaguered in Germany, they knew they would suffer far more under Tsarist autocracy; they believed that the gains they had made for the working class, politically and materially, now required them to support the nation.

There remained an antiwar element, especially in Berlin. They – including Rosa Luxemburg, Karl Liebknecht and Hugo Haase – were expelled from the SPD in 1917 and formed the Independent Social Democratic Party of Germany, in which the Spartacist League was influential. Bernstein left the party during the war, as did Karl Kautsky, who had played an important role as the leading Marxist theoretician and editor of the theoretical journal of SPD, "Die Neue Zeit". Neither joined the Communist Party of Germany after the war; they both came back to the SPD in the early 1920s. From 1915 on theoretical discussions within the SPD were dominated by a group of former anti-revisionist Marxists, who tried to legitimize the support of the First World War by the German SPD group in the Reichstag with Marxist arguments. Instead of the class struggle they proclaimed the struggle of peoples. The group was led by Heinrich Cunow, Paul Lensch and Konrad Haenisch ("Lensch-Cunow-Haenisch-Gruppe") and was close to the Russian-German revolutionary and social scientist Alexander Parvus, who gave a public forum to the group with his journal "Die Glocke". From the teachings of Kurt Schumacher and Professor Johann Plenge, there is a link to the current centrist "Seeheimer Kreis" within the SPD founded by Annemarie Renger, Schumacher's former secretary.

==== German Revolution (1918–1919) ====
In the German Revolution of 1918-1919, the SPD sided with the Reichswehr against the left-wing uprisings of the period, while the Reichstag elected Ebert as head of the new government.

A revolutionary government met for the first time in November 1918. Known as the Council of People's Deputies, it consisted of three Majority Social Democrats (Friedrich Ebert, Philipp Scheidemann, and Otto Landsberg) and three Independent Social Democrats (Emil Barth, Wilhelm Dittmann, and Hugo Haase). The new government faced a social crisis in the German Reich following the end of the First World War, with Germany threatened by hunger and chaos. There was, for the most part, an orderly return of soldiers back into civilian life, while the threat of starvation was combated. Wage levels were raised, universal proportional representation for all parliaments was introduced, and a series of regulations on unemployment benefits, job-creation and protection measures, health insurance, and pensions saw the institution of important political and social reforms. In February 1918, workers made an agreement with employers which secured them total freedom of association, the legal guarantee of an eight-hour workday, and the extension of wage agreements to all branches of trade and industry. The People's Commissioners made these changes legally binding. In addition, the SPD-steered provisional government introduced binding state arbitration of labor conflicts, created worker's councils in large industrial firms, and opened the path to the unionization of rural labourers. In December 1918, a decree was passed providing relief for the unemployed. This provided that communities were to be responsible for unemployment relief (without fixing an amount) and established that the Reich would contribute 50% and the respective German state 33% of the outlay. That same month, the government declared that labour exchanges were to be further developed with the financial assistance of the Reich. Responsibility for job placement was first transferred from the Demobilization Office to the Minister of Labour and then to the National Employment Exchange Office, which came into being in January 1920.

=== Weimar Republic (1918–1933) ===
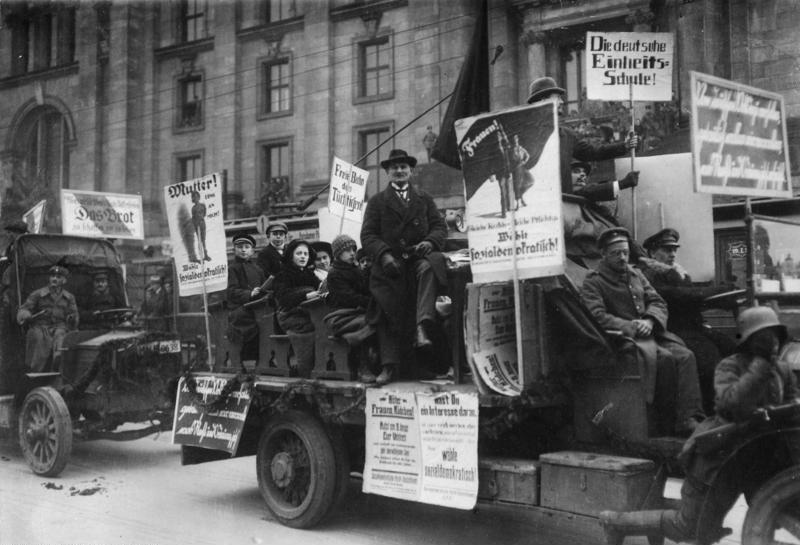
SPD activists calling for the National Assembly elections in 1919

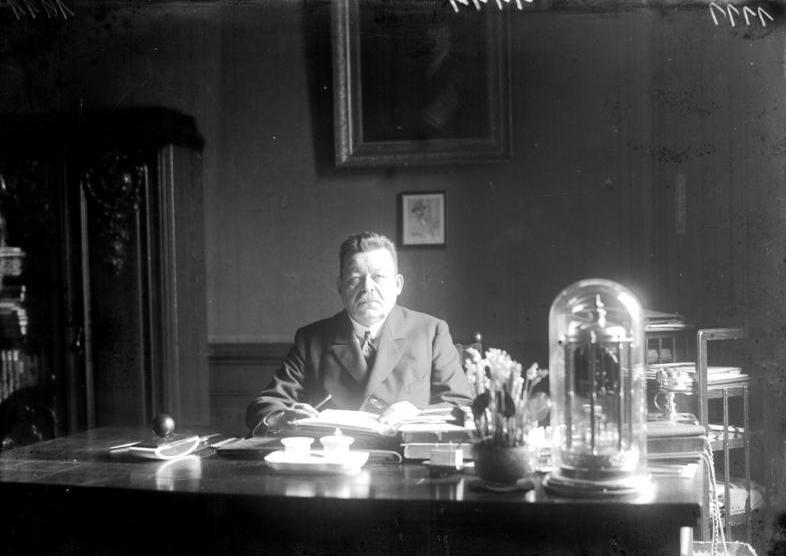
Reichspräsident Friedrich Ebert (in office 1919–1925), one of the first social democratic heads of state in the world

Subsequently, the Social Democratic Party and the newly founded Communist Party of Germany (KPD), which consisted mostly of former members of the SPD, became bitter rivals, not least because of the legacy of the German Revolution. Under Defense Minister of Germany Gustav Noske, the party aided in putting down the Communist and left wing Spartacist uprising throughout Germany in early 1919 with the use of the extreme right wing Freikorps, a decision that has remained the source of much controversy amongst historians to this day. While the KPD remained in staunch opposition to the newly established parliamentary system, the SPD became a part of the so-called Weimar Coalition, one of the pillars of the struggling republic, leading several of the short-lived interwar cabinets. The threat of the Communists put the SPD in a difficult position. The party had a choice between becoming more radical (which could weaken the Communists but lose its base among the middle class) or stay moderate, which would damage its base among the working class. Splinter groups formed: In 1928, a small group calling itself Neu Beginnen, in the autumn of 1931, the Socialist Workers' Party of Germany. The Iron Front, founded in December 1931, was not a splinter party but a nonpartisan association led mostly by the SPD.

==== Social reform (1918–1926) ====
Under Weimar, the SPD was able put its ideas of social justice into practice by influencing a number of progressive social changes while both in and out of government. The SPD re-introduced and overhauled the Bismarckian welfare state, providing protection for the disadvantaged, the unemployed, the aged, and the young. The "Decree on Collective Agreements, Workers' and Employees' Committees, and the Settlement of Labour Disputes" of December 1918 boosted the legal effectiveness of collective bargaining contracts, while a number of measures were carried out to assist veterans, including the Decree on Social Provision for Disabled Veterans and Surviving Dependents of February 1919 and the Compensation Law for Re-enlisted Men and Officers of September 1919. As noted by one study, “The Social Democrats were not only ideologically committed to state intervention in the economic process, but also had been the main force behind the soziale volkstaat (social welfare state), that net of social services and public insurance schemes that remains one of the Weimar Republic’s most lasting legacies.” The War Victims' Benefits Law of May 1920 introduced a more generous war-disability system than had existed in the past. This new piece of legislation took into account all grievances voiced during the war and, for the first time in social legislation in Germany, considered child maintenance in calculating widows' pensions.

In 1919, the federal government launched a campaign to recolonize parts of the German interior including in Silesia, and new provisions for maternity were introduced. In February 1920, an industrial relations law was passed, giving workers in industry legally guaranteed representation, together with the right to co-determination in cases of hiring and firing, holiday arrangements, the fixing of working hours and regulations, and the introduction of new methods of payment. A Socialisation Law was also passed, while the government adopted guidelines on the workers' councils. In addition to workers' councils at national, regional, and factory level, the government made provision for economic councils in which employers and employees would work together on matters affecting the economy as a whole (such as nationalisation) and lend support to the Weimar parliament.

SPD governments also introduced unemployment insurance benefits for all workers (in 1918), trade union recognition and an eight-hour workday, while municipalities that came under SPD control or influence expanded educational and job-training opportunities and set up health clinics. Off the shop floor, Social Democratic workers took advantage of the adult education halls, public libraries, swimming pools, schools, and low-income apartments built by municipalities during the Weimar years, while considerable wage increases won for the majority of workers by the Free Trade Unions between 1924 and 1928 helped to narrow the gap between unskilled and skilled workers. A number of reforms were also made in education, as characterised by the introduction of the four-year common primary school. Educational opportunities were further widened by the promotion of adult education and culture. The SPD also played an active and exemplary role in the development of local politics in thousands of towns and communities during this period. In 1923, the SPD Minister of Finance, Rudolf Hilferding, laid much of the groundwork for the stabilization of the German currency.

As noted by Edward R. Dickinson, the German Revolution of 1918–1919 and the democratisation of the state and local franchise provided Social Democracy with a greater degree of influence at all levels of government than it had been able to achieve before 1914. As a result of the reform of municipal franchises, socialists gained control of many of the country's major cities. This provided Social Democrats with a considerable degree of influence in social policy, as most welfare programmes (even those programmes mandated by national legislation) were implemented by municipal government. By the Twenties, with the absence of a revolution and the reformist and revision element dominant in the SPD, Social Democrats regarded the expansion of social welfare programmes, and particularly the idea that the citizen had a right to have his or her basic needs met by society at large, as central to the construction of a just and democratic social order. Social Democrats therefore pushed the expansion of social welfare programmes energetically at all levels of government, and SPD municipal administrations were in the forefront of the development of social programmes.

Protective measures for workers were vastly improved, under the influence or direction of the SPD, and members of the SPD pointed to positive changes that they had sponsored, such as improvements in public health, unemployment insurance, maternity benefits, and the building of municipal housing. During its time in opposition throughout the Twenties, the SPD was able to help push through a series of reforms beneficial to workers, including increased investment in public housing, expanded disability, health, and social insurance programmes, the restoration of an eight-hour workday in large firms, and the implementation of binding arbitration by the Labour Ministry. In 1926, the Social Democrats were responsible for a law which increased maternity benefit "to cover the cost of midwifery, medical help and all necessary medication and equipment for home births." Margarethe Starrmann, a civil servant who joined the SPD in 1920, helped to set up welfare in Saxony after 1918 and held numerous political posts during the Weimar era, such as at the ministries of welfare and labour. In this capacity, she drew up various laws such as those related to illegitimacy, juvenile courts, and the safeguarding of young people.

==== In government (1918–1925; 1928–1930) ====
In the Free State of Prussia, (which became an SPD stronghold following the introduction of universal suffrage) an important housing law was passed in 1918 which empowered local authorities to erect small dwellings and buildings of public utility, provide open spaces, and enact planning measures. The law further directed that all districts with more than 10,000 inhabitants had to issue police ordinances regarding housing hygiene. In addition, a reform in education was carried out. Similar measures were introduced in other areas subjected to the influence of the SPD, with the Reich (also under the influence of the SPD) controlling rents and subsidising the construction of housing.

During the Weimar era, the SPD held the chancellorship on two occasions, first from 1918 to 1920, and then again from 1928 to 1930. Through aggressive opposition politics, the SPD (backed by the union revival linked to economic upsurge) was able to effect greater progress in social policy from 1924 to 1928 than during the previous and subsequent periods of the party's participation in government. In Prussia, the SPD was part of the government from 1918 to 1932, and for all but nine months of that time (April–November 1921 and February–April 1925), a member of the SPD was minister president.

The SPD's last period in office was arguably a failure, due to both its lack of a parliamentary majority (which forced it to make compromises to right-wing parties) and its inability to confront the Great Depression. In 1927, the defence ministry had prevailed on the government of Wilhelm Marx to provide funds in its draft budget of 1928 for the construction of the first of six small battleships allowed for under the Treaty of Versailles, although the Federal Council (largely for financial reasons) stopped this action. This issue played a major role during the 1928 German federal election, with supporters of the proposal arguing that all the possibilities left for German armaments should be fully used, while the SPD and the KPD saw this as a wasteful expenditure, arguing that such money should instead be spent on providing free meals for schoolchildren. The SPD's lack of a parliamentary majority (which prevented it from undertaking any major domestic reform) meant that, in order to hold the coalition together, Hermann Müller and the other SPD ministers were forced to make concessions on issues such as taxation, unemployment insurance, and the construction of pocket battleships.

Party chairman Otto Wels demanded that the funds be spent on free school meals as had been promised during the election campaign. However, against the wishes and votes of Wels and the other SPD deputies, the SPD ministers in Müller's cabinet (including Müller himself) voted in favour of the first battleship being built, a decision that arguably destroyed the party's credibility.

Müller's SPD government eventually fell as a result of the catastrophic effects of the Great Depression. Müller's government, an ideologically diverse "Grand Coalition" representing five parties ranging from the left to the right, was unable to develop effective counter-measures to tackle the catastrophic effects of the economic crisis, as characterised by the massive rise in the numbers of registered unemployed. In 1928–29, 2.5 million were estimated to be unemployed, a figure that reached over 3 million by the following winter. A major problem facing Müller's government was a deficit in the Reich budget, which the government spending more than it was receiving. This situation was made worse by the inadequacy of the unemployment scheme which was unable to pay out enough benefits to the rising numbers of unemployed, forcing the government to make contributions to the scheme (which in turn worsened the budget deficit). The coalition was badly divided on this issue, with the SPD wishing to raise the level of contributions to the scheme while safeguarding both those in work and those out of work as much as possible. The right-wing parties, by contrast, wished to reduce unemployment benefits while lightening the tax burden. Unable to garner enough support in the Reichstag to pass laws, Müller turned to President Paul von Hindenburg for support, wishing him to grant him the use of the emergency powers under Article 48 of the Weimar Constitution so that he did not have to rely on support from the Reichstag.

Müller refused to agree to reductions in unemployment benefit which the Centre Party under Heinrich Brüning saw as necessary. The government finally collapsed in March 1930 when Müller (lacking support from Hindenburg) resigned, a fall from office that according to the historian William Smaldone marked "the effective end of parliamentary government under Weimar." The new government under Heinrich Brüning was propped up by President Hindenburg without the support of the Reichstag and operated by emergency decree. When the decrees were repealed, the Reichstag was dissolved and the 1930 election delivered an enormous and shocking surge for the Nazi Party. The SPD decided to tolerate Brüning's government and not repeal his decrees in an effort to avoid further instability and Nazi gains. As the Brüning government implemented austerity to counter the depression, the SPD debated its own economic program. The proto-Keynesian WTB plan was supported by the unions but rejected by the party. They went into 1932 with no specific economic programme, and faced harsh defeat in the July 1932 elections.

==== Collapse (1932–1933) ====
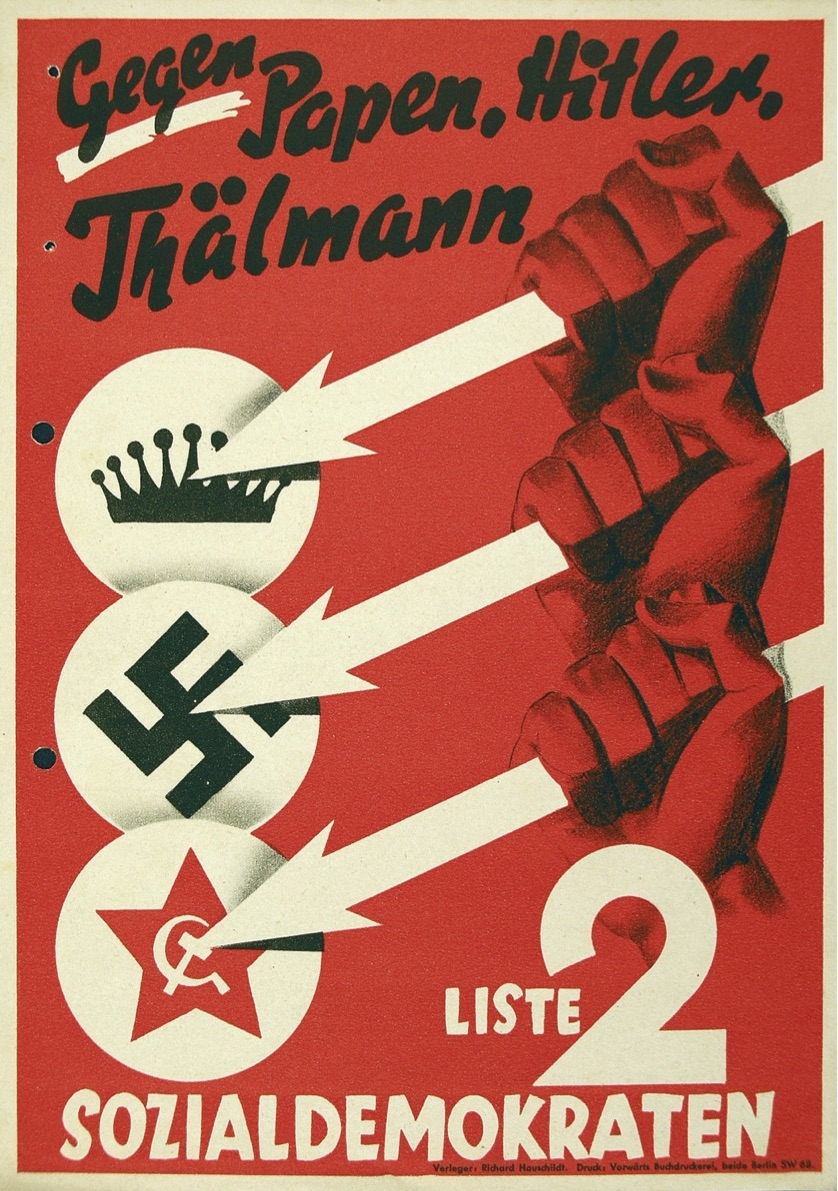
A widely publicized SPD election poster from 1932, with Three Arrows symbol representing resistance against reactionary conservatism, Nazism and Communism, and with the slogan "Against Papen, Hitler, Thälmann."

On 20 July 1932, the SPD-led Prussian government in Berlin, headed by Otto Braun, was ousted by Franz von Papen, the new Chancellor, by means of a Presidential decree. Following the appointment of Adolf Hitler as chancellor on 30 January 1933 by President Hindenburg, the SPD received 18.25% of the votes during the last multi-party elections on 5 March, gaining 120 seats. However, the SPD was unable to prevent the ratification of the Enabling Act, which granted extraconstitutional powers to the government. The SPD was the only party to vote against the act (the KPD being already outlawed and its deputies were under arrest, dead, or in exile). Several of its deputies had been detained by the police under the provisions of the Reichstag Fire Decree, which suspended civil liberties. Others suspected that the SPD would be next, and fled into exile. However, even if they had all been present, the Act would have still passed, as the 441 votes in favour would have still been more than the required two-thirds majority.

After the passing of the Enabling Act, dozens of SPD deputies were arrested, and several more fled into exile. Most of the leadership settled in Prague. Those that remained tried their best to appease the Nazi Party. On 19 May, the few SPD deputies who had not been jailed or fled into exile voted in favour of Hitler's foreign policy statement, in which he declared his willingness to renounce all offensive weapons if other countries followed suit. They also publicly distanced themselves from their brethren abroad who condemned Hitler's tactics.

It was to no avail. Over the course of the spring, the police confiscated the SPD's buildings, newspapers and property. On 21 June 1933, Interior Minister Wilhelm Frick ordered the SPD closed down on the basis of the Reichstag Fire Decree, declaring the party "subversive and inimical to the State." All SPD deputies at the state and federal level were stripped of their seats, and all SPD meetings and publications were banned. Party members were also blacklisted from public office and the civil service. Frick took the line that the SPD members in exile were committing treason from abroad, while those still in Germany were helping them. The party was a member of the Labour and Socialist International between 1923 and 1940.

=== Nazi era and SoPaDe (1933–1945) ===
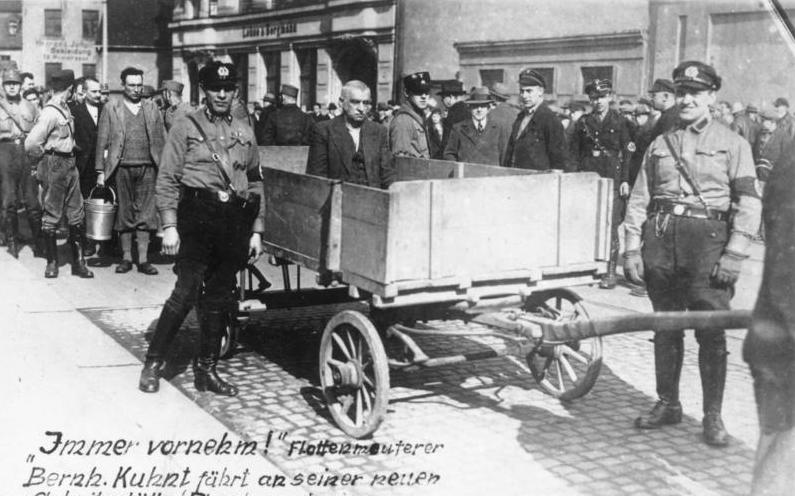
Former SPD minister president of Oldenburg, Bernhard Kuhnt, humiliated by Nazis in 1933

Being the only party in the Reichstag to have voted against the Enabling Act, the SPD was banned in the summer of 1933 by the new Nazi government. Many of its members were jailed or sent to Nazi concentration camps. An exile organization, known as Sopade, was established, initially in Prague. Others left the areas where they had been politically active and moved to other towns where they were not known.

Between 1936 and 1939 some SPD members fought in the Spanish Civil War for the Republicans against Francisco Franco's Nationalists and the German Condor Legion.

After the annexation of Czechoslovakia in 1938 the exile party resettled in Paris and, after the defeat of France in 1940, in London. Only a few days after the outbreak of World War II in September 1939 the exiled SPD in Paris declared its support for the Allies and for the military removal from power of the Nazi government.

== Contemporary Germany ==
=== From occupation to the Federal Republic (1946–1966) ===
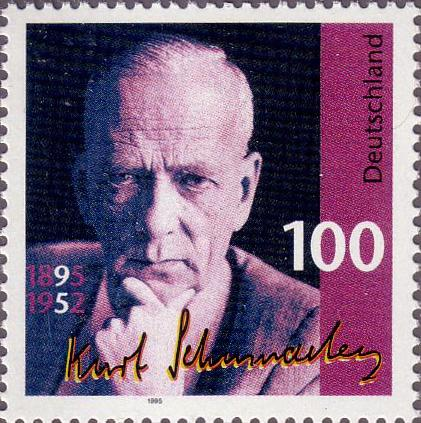
World War I volunteer and concentration camp inmate Kurt Schumacher, SPD chairman after the war

The SPD was recreated after World War II in 1946 and admitted in all four occupation zones. In West Germany, it was initially in opposition from the first election of the newly founded Federal Republic in 1949 until 1966. The party had a leftist period and opposed the republic's integration into Western structures, believing that this might diminish the chances for German reunification.

The SPD was somewhat hampered for much of the early history of the Federal Republic, in part because the bulk of its former heartland was now in the Soviet occupation sector, which later became East Germany. In the latter area, the SPD was forced to merge with the Communist Party of Germany to form the Socialist Unity Party of Germany (SED) in 1946. The few recalcitrant SPD members were quickly pushed out, leaving the SED as essentially a renamed and enlarged KPD. In the British Occupation Zone, the SPD held a referendum on the issue of merging with the KPD, with 80% of party members rejecting such a fusion. This referendum was ignored by the newly formed SED.

Nonetheless, a few former SPD members held high posts in the East German government. Otto Grotewohl served as East Germany's first prime minister from 1949 to 1964. For much of that time he retained some vestiges of his SPD roots. For instance, he publicly advocated a less repressive approach to governing, especially during the crackdown on the East German uprising of 1953. Friedrich Ebert, Jr., son of former president Ebert, served as mayor of East Berlin from 1949 to 1967; he'd reportedly been blackmailed into supporting the merger by using his father's role in the schism of 1918 against him.

During the fall of Communist rule in 1989, the SPD (first called SDP) was re-established as a separate party in East Germany (Social Democratic Party in the GDR), independent of the rump SED, and then merged with its West German counterpart upon reunification.

Despite remaining out of office for much of the postwar period, the SPD were able to gain control of a number of local governments and implement progressive social reforms. As noted by Manfred Schmidt, SPD-controlled Lander governments were more active in the social sphere and transferred more funds to public employment and education than CDU/CSU-controlled Lander. During the mid-sixties, mainly SPD-governed Lander such as Hesse and the three city-states launched the first experiments with comprehensive schools as a means of as expanding educational opportunities. In the Bundestag, the SPD opposition were partly responsible for the establishment of the postwar welfare state under the Adenauer Administration, having put parliamentary pressure on the CDU to carry out more progressive social policies during its time in office.

In the Bundestag, The SPD aspired to be a "constructive opposition," which expressed itself not only in the role it played in framing the significant amount of new legislation introduced in the first parliamentary terms of the Bundestag, but also in the fact that by far the biggest proportion of all laws were passed with the votes of SPD members. The SPD played a notable part in legislation on reforms to the national pensions scheme, the integration of refugees, and the building of public-sector housing. The SPD also had a high-profile "in judicial policy with the Public Prosecutor Adolf Arndt, in the parliamentary decision on the Federal Constitutional Court, and reparations for the victims of National Socialism." In 1951, the law on the right of "co-determination" for employees in the steel, iron, and mining industries was passed with the combined votes of the SPD and CDU, and against those of the FDP.

=== Governing party (1966–1982) ===
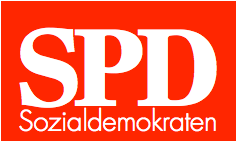
Logo of the Social Democratic Party during the 1960s and 1970s

In 1966 the coalition of the Christian Democratic Union (CDU) and the liberal Free Democratic Party (FDP) fell and a grand coalition between CDU/CSU and SPD was formed under the leadership of CDU Chancellor Kurt Georg Kiesinger, with SPD leader Willy Brandt as Vice-Chancellor. The welfare state was considerably expanded, while social spending was almost doubled between 1969 and 1975. Changes were made to income maintenance schemes which met some of the SPD's long-standing demands, and many other social reforms were introduced, including the equalising of wages and salaries between white-collar and blue-collar employees, the continuation of wage and salary payments, a law to promote employment, and a vocational training law. Although these measures were largely due to the efforts of the CDU minister Hans Katzer, it is arguable that he would never have been able to push his programme through the cabinet (let alone envisage it) without the SPD.

The 1969 Employment Promotion Act, which was based largely on a proposal prepared by the SPD in 1966, established active labour market intervention measures such as employment research, and offered "substantial state assistance to employees with educational aspirations." Under the direction of the SPD Minister of Economics Karl Schiller, the federal government adopted Keynesian demand management for the first time ever. Schiller called for legislation that would provide both his ministry and the federal government with greater authority to guide economic policy. In 1967, Schiller introduced the Law for Promoting Stability and Growth, which was subsequently passed by the Bundestag. Regarded as the Magna Carta of medium-term economic management, the legislation provided for coordination of federal, Lander, and local budget plans in order to give fiscal policy a stronger impact. It also set a number of optimistic targets for four basic standards by which West German economic success would henceforth be measured, which included trade balance, employment levels, economic growth, and currency stability.

One of the rare German Keynesians of that era, Schiller believed that government had both "the obligation and the capacity to shape economic trends and to smooth out and even eliminate the business cycle," and his adopted policy of Keynesian demand management helped West Germany to overcome the economic recession of 1966/67. Unemployment was quickly reduced (standing at just under 1% by Autumn 1968), while industrial output rose by almost 12% in 1968. The successful economic and financial policies pursued by the Grand Coalition under the direction of Schiller was also helped by the persuasion of entrepreneurs and trade unions to accept a programme of "concerted action." According to Lisanne Radice and Giles Radice, "concerted action" was not a formal incomes policy, but it did nevertheless ensure that collective bargaining took place "within a broadly agreed view of the direction of the economy and the relationships between full employment, output and inflation." In addition, Schiller's economic policies were not only successful in restoring West Germany's economic growth, but they also demonstrated the SPD's economic competence, and this undoubtedly played a major role in the victory of the SPD in the federal election of 1969.

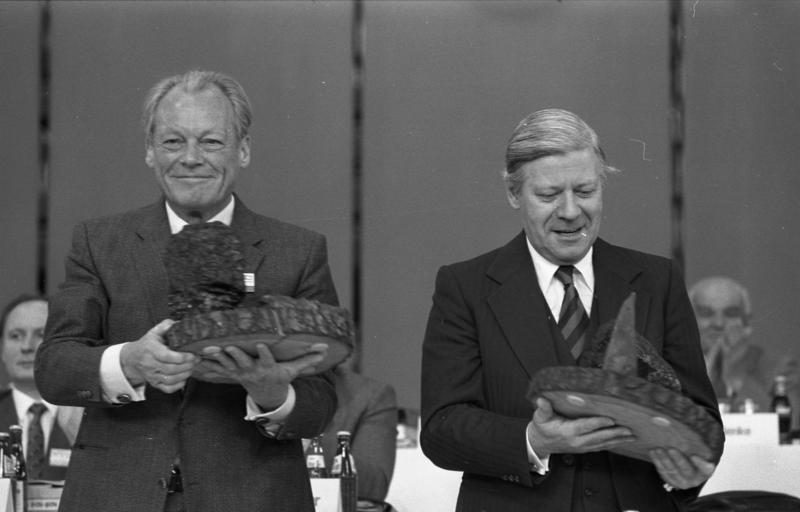
Party convention of 1982: SPD chairman Willy Brandt and chancellor Helmut Schmidt

In 1969 the SPD won a majority for the first time since 1928 by forming a social-liberal coalition with the FDP and led the federal government under Chancellors Willy Brandt and Helmut Schmidt from 1969 until 1982. In its 1959 Godesberg Program, the SPD officially abandoned the concept of a workers' party and Marxist principles, while continuing to stress social welfare provision. Although the SPD originally opposed West Germany's 1955 rearmament and entry into NATO while it favoured neutrality and reunification with East Germany, it now strongly supports German ties with the alliance.

A wide range of reforms were carried out under the Social-Liberal coalition, including, as summarised by one historical study

'improved health and accident insurance, better unemployment compensation, rent control, payments to families with children, subsidies to encourage savings and investments, and measures to "humanize the world of work" such as better medical care for on-the-job illnesses or injuries and mandated improvements in the work environment.'

Under the SDP-FDP coalition, social policies in West Germany took on a more egalitarian character and a number of important reforms were carried out to improve the prospects of previously neglected and underprivileged groups. Greater emphasis was placed on policies favouring single parents, larger families, and the lower paid, and further improvements were made in social benefits for pensioners and disabled persons. Rates of social assistance (excluding rent) as a percentage of average gross earnings of men in manufacturing industries rose during the Social-Liberal coalition's time in office, while social welfare provision was greatly extended, with pensions and health care opened up to large sections of the population. This in turn substantially increased the size and cost of the social budget, as social program costs grew by over 10% a year during much of the 1970s. Government spending as a percentage of GDP rose significantly under the SPD-FDP coalition, from 39% in 1969 to around 50% by 1982.

From 1970 to 1975, expenditures on social welfare programs rose from DM 174.7 billion to DM 334.1 billion. Between 1970 and 1981, social spending as a proportion of GNP rose by 21.4%, and in terms of percentage of GNP went up from 25,7% in 1970 to 31.2% in 1981. Between 1970 and 1982, federal spending rose by 178.% However, the employment crisis in West Germany during the Seventies, together with the government's reform laws, led to a gradual increase in federal debt. In 1970, net federal borrowing stood at DM 1.11 billion, but reached 1.44 bn in 1971, 3.98 bn in 1972, 2.68bn in 1973, and 9.48 bn in 1974.

Much was accomplished in the way of social reform during the SDP-FDP coalition's first five years on office, with one study noting that ""the years 1969 to 1974 represent a phase of social policy in which the state introduced new minimum benefits and extended existing ones."

In April 1970, the government drew up an Action Programme for the Promotion of the Rehabilitation of Handicapped Persons. During that same year, bills were tabled to extend and increase housing allowances (passed in 1970), to extend and standardise the promotion of vocational training (passed in 1971), to automatically index pensions for war victims (passed in 1970), to increase family allowances (passed in 1970), and to reform "shop rules" (which came into force in 1972). In 1974, a bankruptcy allowance was introduced for employed persons when their employers became insolvent. Developments in accident insurance led to the inclusion of schoolchildren, students and children at kindergarten and thus to more widespread measures for accident prevention. In addition, farm and household assistance was introduced as a new service in agricultural accident insurance. A major pension reform law extended the accessibility of pension insurance by providing generous possibilities for backpayments of contributions, while adjustment of currently paid out pensions was brought forward by 6 months. The Rehabilitation and Assimilation Law of 1974 improved and standardised benefits for the disabled, while a law was passed that same year on the establishment of an additional relief fund for persons employed in agriculture and forestry. The Law on the Improvement of Works' Old Age Schemes of 1974 brought conditional non-forfeiture of qualifying periods for works pensions as well as the prohibition of cuts in works pensions due to increases in social insurance pensions. In addition, a number of reforms in areas such as civil and consumer rights the environment, education, and urban renewal were carried out. in 1972, a pension reform act was passed which, according to one historical study, ensured that workers "would not suffer financial hardship and could maintain an adequate standard of living after retirement." In 1973, sickness benefits became available in cases where a parent had to care for a sick child. In March 1974, Social Assistance (SA) was expanded, "concerning family supplements, means test, and certain additional payments."

War victims’ pensions became index-linked to the general movement of incomes, and in June 1970 an amending law to a Capital Formation Law doubled the concessionary savings amount. A tax reform was also introduced in July 1974 that did away with the progressive tax scales in the lower and middle-range income groups while doubling the earned income allowance from DM 240 to DM 480.

Under a law of April 1974, the protection hitherto granted to the victims of war or industrial accidents for the purpose of their occupational and social reintegration was extended to all handicapped persons, whatever the cause of their handicap, provided that their capacity to work has been reduced by at least 50%. Another law, passed in August that same year, supplemented this protection by providing that henceforth the benefits for the purposes of medical and occupational rehabilitation would be the same for all the categories of persons concerned: war victims, the sick, the victims of industrial accidents, congenitally handicapped persons, representing a total of about 4 million persons in all. In addition, a new benefit was introduced to help such people in all branches of social security, taking the form of an adaptation benefit equivalent to 80% of the previous gross salary and to be granted over the period between the time when the person in question is forced to stop work and the time when he resumes work. A law on home-based workers, passed by the Bundestag in June 1974, sought to modernise the working conditions of approximately 300 000 people who work at home by means of the following measures:

- Employers were obliged to inform their home-based workers concerning the method of calculation and the composition of their pay.
- In order to increase safety at work the employer was obliged to explain accident risks and dangers to health.
- Home-based workers were now given the opportunity of making contributions towards asset formation.
- Protection from dismissal was extended. The periods of notice, which are graduated according to the length of time the worker has been employed, were considerably increased. In addition, the guarantee of payment during the period of notice was consolidated.
- The agreed wage for the same or equivalent work in industry would be used more than previously as the standard for wage increases for home-based workers.
- The Law also applied to office work at home, which was becoming increasingly important and substantial.

Children's allowances for students up to the age of twenty-seven were introduced, together with a flexible retirement age, new married couples' and families' legislation, an extension of co-determination, rehabilitation and special employment rights for the severely handicapped, adjustments and increases in the pensions of war victims, a revision of child benefit, a new youth employment protection law, health insurance for farmers, pension schemes for the self-employed, and guaranteed works' pensions. Although the principle of the social welfare state was enshrined in the constitution of West Germany, and laws and measures taken (often jointly by the CDU/CSU coalition partners and the SPD) to meet this commitment, it was only when the SPD came to power in Bonn that the provisions of the social welfare system "reached a level which few other countries could equal." In 1975, three tax levels were introduced that removed many lower-income persons from the tax rolls and raised child benefit payments.

Various improvements were also made to health care provision and coverage during the social-liberal coalition's time in office. In 1974, domestic aid during in-patient or in-patient cures was established, sick pay to compensate for wages lost while caring for a child was introduced, and the time-limit to in-patient care was removed. That same year, the cover of rehabilitation services was increased, together with the cover of dental and orthodontic services. Health insurance coverage was extended to self-employed agricultural workers in 1972, and to students and the disabled in 1975. in 1971, an International Transactions Tax Law was passed.

In 1974, a number of amendments were made to the Federal Social Assistance Act. "Help for the vulnerable" was renamed "help for overcoming particular social difficulties," and the number of people eligible for assistance was greatly extended to include all those "whose own capabilities cannot meet the increasing demands of modern industrial society." The intention of these amendments was to include especially such groups as discharged prisoners, drug and narcotic addicts, alcoholics, and the homeless. Under the SPD, people who formerly had to be supported by their relatives became entitled to social assistance. In addition, the recreational and residential value of towns (building schools, training institutions, baths, sports facilities, Kindegarten etc.) was increased from 1970 with the help of a new programme.

A number of liberal social reforms in areas like censorship, homosexuality, divorce, education, and worker participation in company management were introduced, whilst social security benefits were significantly increased. Increases were made in unemployment benefits, while substantial improvements in benefits were made for farmers, students, war invalids, the sick, families with many children, women, and pensioners between 1970 and 1975, which led to a doubling of benefit and social security payments during that period. By 1979, old age and survivors' benefits were 53% higher in real terms than in 1970, while family benefits were 95% higher.

The Second Sickness Insurance Modification Law linked the indexation of the income-limit for compulsory employee coverage to the development of the pension insurance contribution ceiling (75% of the ceiling), obliged employers to pay half of the contributions in the case of voluntary membership, extended the criteria for voluntary membership of employees, and introduced preventive medical check-ups for certain groups. The Law on Sickness Insurance for Farmers (1972) included the self-employed, their dependants and people who receive old age assistance in sickness insurance. The Law on the Social Insurance of Disabled Persons (1975) included in sickness and pension insurance disabled persons employed in workshops and institutions under certain conditions, while a law was passed in June that year to include all students in statutory sickness insurance. Social protection against the risks of an occupational accident, death, disability, and old age was newly regulated in 1974 through a Civil Servant Provisioning Law that was standard throughout the country.

Educational reforms were introduced which led to the setting up of new colleges and universities, much greater access for young people to the universities, increased provision for pre-school education, and a limited number of comprehensive schools. An educational law of 1971 providing postgraduate support provided highly qualified graduates with the opportunity "to earn their doctorates or undertake research studies."

A more active regional and industrial policy was pursued, tighter rules against dismissal were introduced, day care was introduced for children between the ages of three and six, spending on dental services, drugs, and appliances was increased, environmental protection legislation was passed, expenditure on education at all levels was increased, a tax reform bill was passed, lowering the tax burden for low-income and middle-income groups, the average age of entry into the workforce was increased, working time was reduced, social assistance and unemployment compensation were made more generous, early-retirement options were introduced, and municipalities received more generous federal grants to expand social infrastructure such as conference halls, sports facilities and public swimming pools.

Various measures were introduced to improve environmental conditions and to safeguard the environment, the Federal Emission Control Law established the basis for taking of legal action against those responsible for excessive noise and air pollution, the Works' Constitution Act and Personnel Representation Act strengthened the position of individual employees in offices and factories, and the Works' Safety Law required firms to employ safety specialists and doctors. An amendment to the Labour Management Act (1971) granted workers co-determination on the shop floor while the new Factory Management Law (1972) extended co-determination at the factory level. This Act acknowledged for the first time the presence of trade unions in the workplace, expanded the means of action of the works councils, and improved their work basics as well as those of the youth councils. A law was passed in 1974 allowing for worker representation on the boards of large firms, although this change was not enacted until 1976, after alterations were made. In 1974, redundancy allowances in cases of bankruptcies were introduced. The Federal Law on Personnel Representation, which came into force in April 1974, gave increased co-management rights to those employed in factories and offices in the public sector. The staff councils were given an increased say in social and personal matters, together with a wider operational basis for their activities in connection with day release and training opportunities. The arrangements governing cooperation between the staff councils and the trade union were also improved. Young workers were given increased rights of representation, while foreign workers received voting rights and thus achieved equality in this respect with German employees.

A new federal scale of charges for hospital treatment and a law on hospital financing were introduced to improve hospital treatment, the Hire Purchase Act entitled purchasers to withdraw from their contracts within a certain time limit, compensation for victims of violent acts became guaranteed by law, the Federal Criminal Investigation Office became a modern crime-fighting organisation, and the Federal Education Promotion Act was extended to include large groups of pupils attending vocational schools. In 1973, the minimum statutory retirement age was reduced from 65 to 63, while "flexible" retirement was provided for those between the ages of 63 and 67. In 1974, a federal law was passed that obliged television stations to spend certain amounts of money each year to sponsor productions by independent film companies.

A law to improve the system of sickness benefits provided that those insured would receive compensation when obliged to stay at home to care for a sick child and thereby incurring a loss of income. An insured person could request unpaid leave of absence on such occasions. The same law established the right to a home help, to be paid for by the health service, where the parents are in hospital or undergoing treatment, provided that the household included a child under 8 or a handicapped child required special care. The SPD-FDP coalition's time in office also saw a considerable expansion in the number of childcare places for three- to six-year-old children, with the number of facilities rising from 17,493 in 1970 to 23,938 in 1980, and the number of places from 1,160,700 to 1,392,500 during that same period. Subsidies for day care rose between 1970 and 1980, but fell between 1980 and 1983.

In the field of housing, Brandt stated that the aims of the SPD-FDP government were improving housing benefit, developing a long-term programme of social housing construction, and to increase owner-occupation. As noted by Mark Kleinman, this led to a boom in housing construction, with output peaking at 714,000 in 1973 before falling to under 400,000 in 1976.

A Federal Education Grants Act was also introduced, which opened up better chances of higher education for low-income children. In addition, labor-protection and anti-trust laws were significantly strengthened, while from 1969 to 1975 alone some 140 laws were passed that entitled various socially disadvantaged groups to tax subsidies. During the mid-Seventies recession, eligibility for short-term unemployment benefits was extended from 6 to 12 months, and to 24 months in some cases. Active Labour Market Policies were substantially expanded, with the number of people benefiting from such schemes increasing from 1,600 in 1970 to 648,000 by 1975. In addition, the SPD-FDP government gave more priority to raising minimum housing standards. The Law on Nursing Homes and Homes for the Elderly (1974) sought to guarantee minimum standards in an important area of social services, while the Beratungshilfegesetz (Legal Advice Act) of 1980 strengthened the position of the indigent in need of out of court legal advice and representation. The Maternity Leave Act of 1979 permitted mothers in work to take leave of 6 months after the birth of a child, granted a maternity allowance, and safeguarded jobs for 8 months.

Wage rates also rose significantly under the coalition, as characterised by a 60% real increase in the hourly wages of manufacturing sector employees between 1970 and 1980. In addition, educational opportunities were significantly widened as a result of policies such as the introduction of free higher education, the raising of the school-leaving age to 16, increased expenditure on education at all levels, and the introduction of a generous student stipend system. Although the coalition failed to restructure the education system along comprehensive lines, the cumulative impact of its educational reforms was such that according to Helmut Becker (an authoritative commentator on German education), there was greater achievement at all levels and the chances of a twenty-year-old working-class child born in 1958 going to college or university was approximately six times greater than a similar child born ten years earlier.

In summarising the domestic reforms introduced by the SPD-FDP coalition, historian Reiner Pommerin noted that

"There were few difficulties with the wave of domestic reforms, which the SPD-led coalitions initiated. In fact, the SPD's domestic reform program was often compared with contemporary American developments, like such as civil rights movement and the Great Society".

As noted further by Henrich Potthoff and Susanne Miller, in their evaluation of the record of the SPD-FDP coalition,

"Ostpolitik and detente, the extension of the welfare safety net, and a greater degree of social liberality were the fruits of Social Democratic government during this period which served as a pointer to the future and increased the respect in which the federal republic was held, both in Europe and throughout the world."

=== Opposition (1982–1998) ===
In 1982, the SPD, after governing the Federal Republic of Germany almost 16 years, lost power to the new CDU/CSU-FDP coalition under CDU Chancellor Helmut Kohl who subsequently won four terms as chancellor. The Social Democrats were unanimous about the armament and environmental questions of that time, and the new party The Greens was not ready for a coalition government then.

=== Gerhard Schröder and the consequences (1998–2005) ===
Kohl lost his last re-election bid in 1998 to his SPD challenger Gerhard Schröder, as the SPD formed a red-green coalition with The Greens to take control of the German federal government for the first time in 16 years.

Running on a platform emphasizing the need to reduce unemployment, the SPD emerged as the strongest party in the September 1998 elections with 40.9% of the votes cast. Crucial for this success was the SPD's strong base in big cities and Bundesländer with traditional industries. Forming a coalition government with the Green Party, the SPD thus returned to power for the first time since 1982. In so doing, it formed the first left-wing government in the Federal Republic.

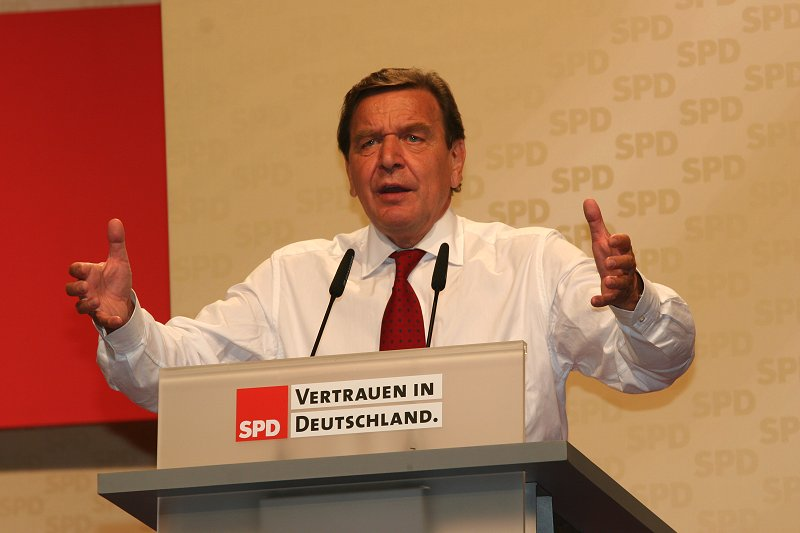
Chancellor Gerhard Schröder at an election campaign event in Esslingen on 24 August 2005

Oskar Lafontaine, elected SPD chairman in November 1996 had in the run-up to the election forgone a bid for the SPD nomination for the chancellor candidacy, after Gerhard Schröder won a sweeping re-election victory as prime minister of his state of Lower Saxony and was widely believed to be the best chance for Social Democrats to regain the Chancellorship after 16 years in opposition. From the beginning of this teaming up between Party chair Lafontaine and chancellor candidate Schröder during the election campaign 1998, rumors in the media about their internal rivalry persisted, albeit always being disputed by the two. After the election victory Lafontaine joined the government as finance minister. The rivalry between the two party leaders escalated in March 1999 leading to the overnight resignation of Lafontaine from all his party and government positions. After staying initially mum about the reasons for his resignation, Lafontaine later cited strong disagreement with the alleged neoliberal and anti-social course Schröder had taken the government on. Schröder himself has never commented on the row with Lafontaine. It is known however, that they haven't spoken to each other ever since. Schröder succeeded Lafontaine as party chairman.

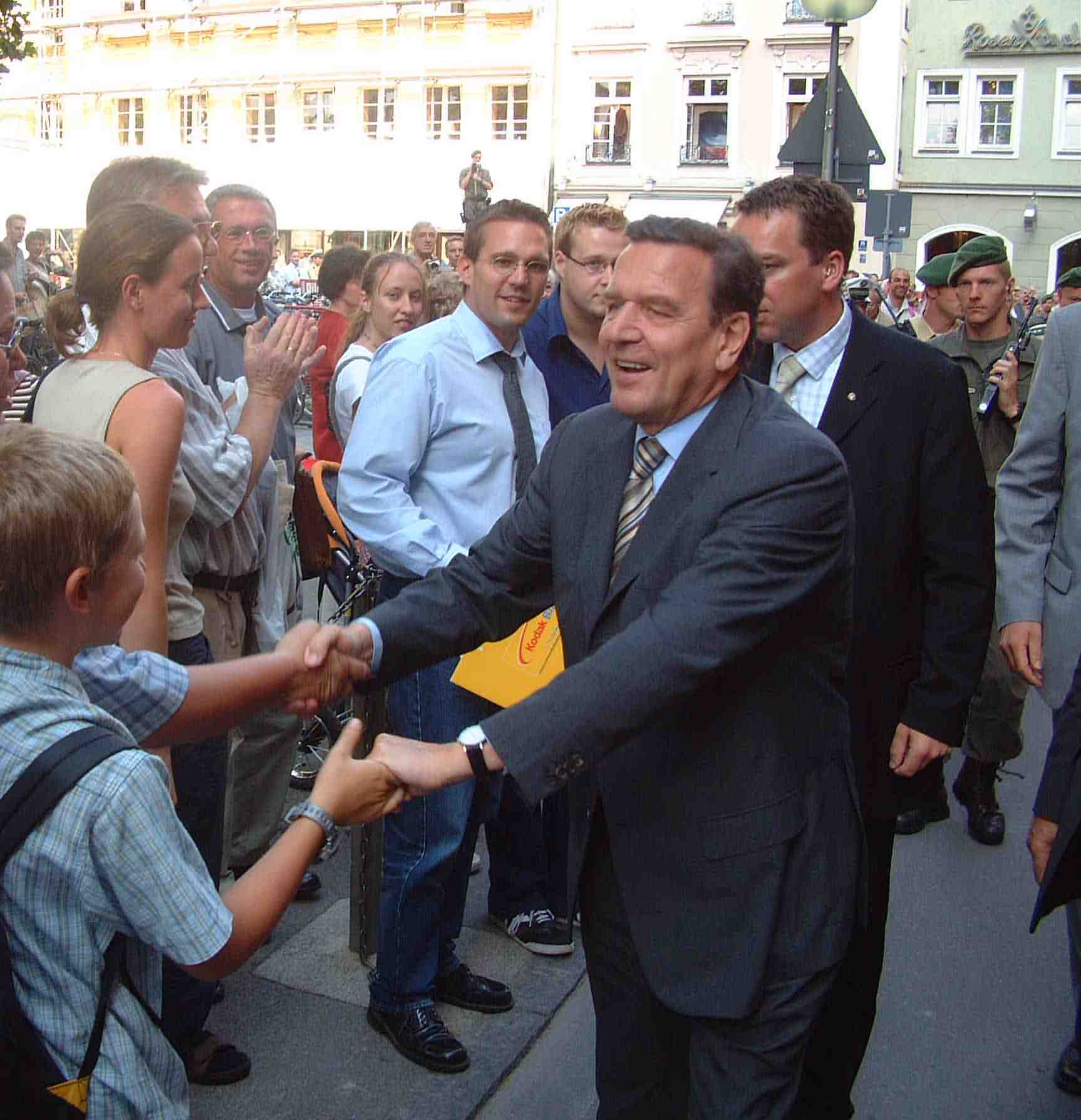
Gerhard Schröder before the federal elections in 2002

A number of progressive measures were introduced by the Schröder Administration during its first term in office. The parental leave scheme was improved, with full-time working parents legally entitled to reduce their working hours from 2001 onwards, while the child allowance was considerably increased, from €112 per month in 1998 to €154 in 2002. Housing allowances were also increased, while a number of decisions by the Kohl Government concerning social policy and the labour market were overturned, as characterised by the reversal of retrenchments in health policy and pension policy.

Changes introduced by the Kohl government on pensions, the continued payment of wages in the case of sickness, and wrongful dismissal were all rescinded. In 1999, for instance, the wage replacement rate for sick pay (which was reduced from 100% to 80% of earnings under the previous Kohl Government) was restored to 100%. A programme on combating youth unemployment was introduced, together new measures designed to out a stop to those designating themselves as "self-employed" for tax purposes, and new regulations on 630-DM jobs, which were subject for the first time to national insurance contributions. Tax reforms brought relief to people on low-incomes and benefited families, while a second pillar was added to the pension system which relied on self-provision for retirement.

In the September 2002 elections, the SPD reached 38.5% of the national vote, barely ahead of the CDU/CSU, and was again able to form a government with the help of The Greens. The European elections of 2004 were a disaster for the SPD, marking its worst result in a nationwide election after World War II with only 21.5% of the vote. Earlier the same year, leadership of the SPD had changed from chancellor Gerhard Schröder to Franz Müntefering, in what was widely regarded as an attempt to deal with internal party opposition to the economic reform programs set in motion by the federal government.

While the SPD was founded in the 19th century to defend the interests of the working class, its commitment to these goals has been disputed by some since 1918, when its leaders supported the suppression of more radical socialist and communist factions during the Spartacist Uprising. But never before has the party moved so far away from its traditional socialist stance as it did under the Schröder government. Its ever-increasing tendency towards liberal economic policies and cutbacks in government spending on social welfare programs led to a dramatic decline in voter support. The Schroeder Administration presided over a significant rise in poverty and inequality, with the percentage of Germans living in poverty, according to one measure, rising from 12% in 2000 to 16.5% in 2006.

Welfare cuts, which affected mainly the SPD's clientele, led to disillusionment amongst supporters and precipitated a fall in party membership. For many years, membership in the SPD had been declining. Down from a high of over 1 million in 1976, there were about 775,000 members at the time of the 1998 election victory, and by February 2008, the figure had dropped to 537,995. By early 2009, membership figures had fallen behind the ones of the CDU for the first time ever.

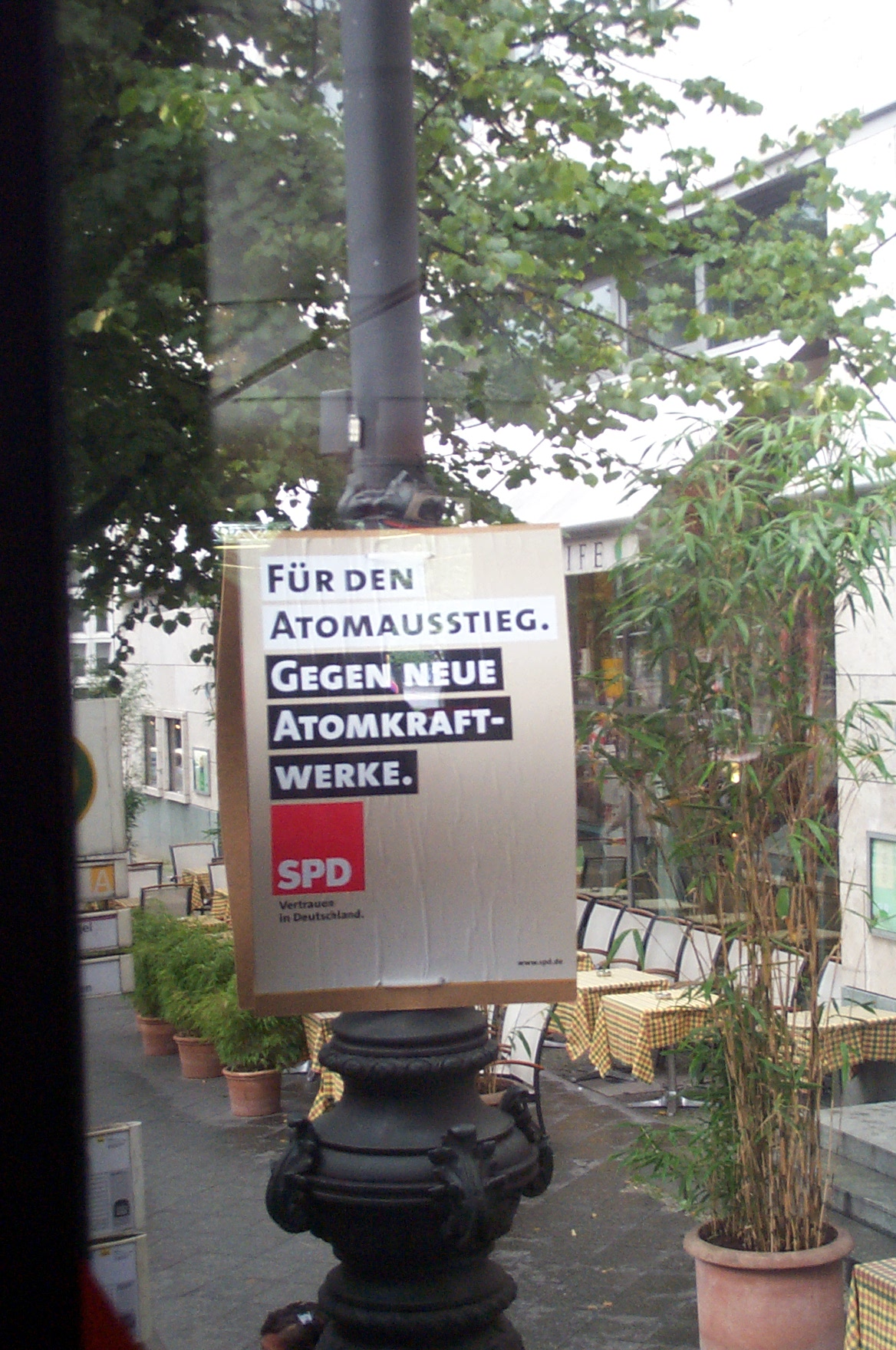
"For nuclear phase-out, against new nuclear plants." Election placard of the Social Democratic Party of Germany for the German federal election, 2005.

In January 2005, some SPD members left the party to found the Labour and Social Justice – The Electoral Alternative (WASG) in opposition to what they consider to be neoliberal leanings displayed by the SPD. Former SPD chairman Oskar Lafontaine also joined this new party. Later, to contest the early federal election called by Schröder after the SPD lost heavily in a state election in their traditional stronghold of North Rhine-Westphalia, the western-based WASG and the eastern-based post-communist Party of Democratic Socialism would merge to form The Left (Die Linke) party. These developments put pressure on the SPD to do something about its social image.

In April 2005, party chairman Franz Müntefering publicly criticized excessive profiteering in Germany's market economy and proposed stronger involvement of the federal state in order to promote economic justice. This triggered a debate that dominated the national news for several weeks. Müntefering's suggestions have been met with both popular support harsh criticism. Political opponents claimed that Müntefering's choice of words, especially his reference to private equity funds as locusts, were bordering on Nazi language.

In the 2005 German federal election, the SPD ended up trailing its rivals by less than 1%, a much closer margin than had been expected. Although the party had presented a program that included some more traditional left themes, such as an additional 3% tax on the highest tax bracket, this did not prevent the Left Party from making a strong showing, largely at the SPD's expense. Nevertheless, the overall result was sufficient to deny the opposition camp a majority.

=== Merkel-led grand coalitions and the decline of the SPD (2005–2021) ===
From 2005 to 2009 and again since 2013 until 2021, the SPD was the junior partner in a grand coalition with the CDU/CSU under the leadership of Chancellor Angela Merkel, with Olaf Scholz as Vice-Chancellor from 2018 to 2021.

After the 2005 federal election, Müntefering resigned as party chairman and was succeeded as chairman by Matthias Platzeck, minister-president of Brandenburg. Müntefering's decision came after the party's steering committee chose Andrea Nahles, a woman from the left wing of the party, as secretary general over Müntefering's choice, his long-time aide Kajo Wasserhövel. After Müntefering said her election indicated that he had lost the confidence of the party and he would therefore resign, Nahles turned down the post of secretary general to prevent the party splitting, and Hubertus Heil was elected in her place.

On 10 April 2006, Matthias Platzeck announced his resignation of the chair because he suffered a major hearing loss in March 2006. The interim chairman from 10 April to 14 May was Kurt Beck. He won the full leadership on a small party convention on 14 May. He resigned on 7 September 2008; on 8 September 2008 the party's executive committee nominated Müntefering to be elected as chairman at an extraordinary party conference on 18 October 2008. In the meantime, Frank-Walter Steinmeier serves as provisional chairman. During the Schröder administration, Schröder and Lafontaine disliked each other, because Lafontaine quit as Finance Minister in 1999. After his resignation there was a huge distrust of Lafontaine in the SPD which lasts to today. Due to the rise of Merkel and Guido Westerwelle on the national stage of politics in 2005 and a belief in the German public of the failed social policies of the SPD on labour issues (Hartz IV), the SPD lost heavily in opinion polls and lost a couple of statewide elections. There was the urgency to form new coalitions with the Left, a party with a similar political agenda, than the weakened Green Party or the other conservative parties in Germany; however, the leader of the Left was the lost child of the SPD, Oskar Lafontaine, who had fallen out with the SPD. There is a common oath in the SPD not to form coalitions with the Left, because of Lafontaine.

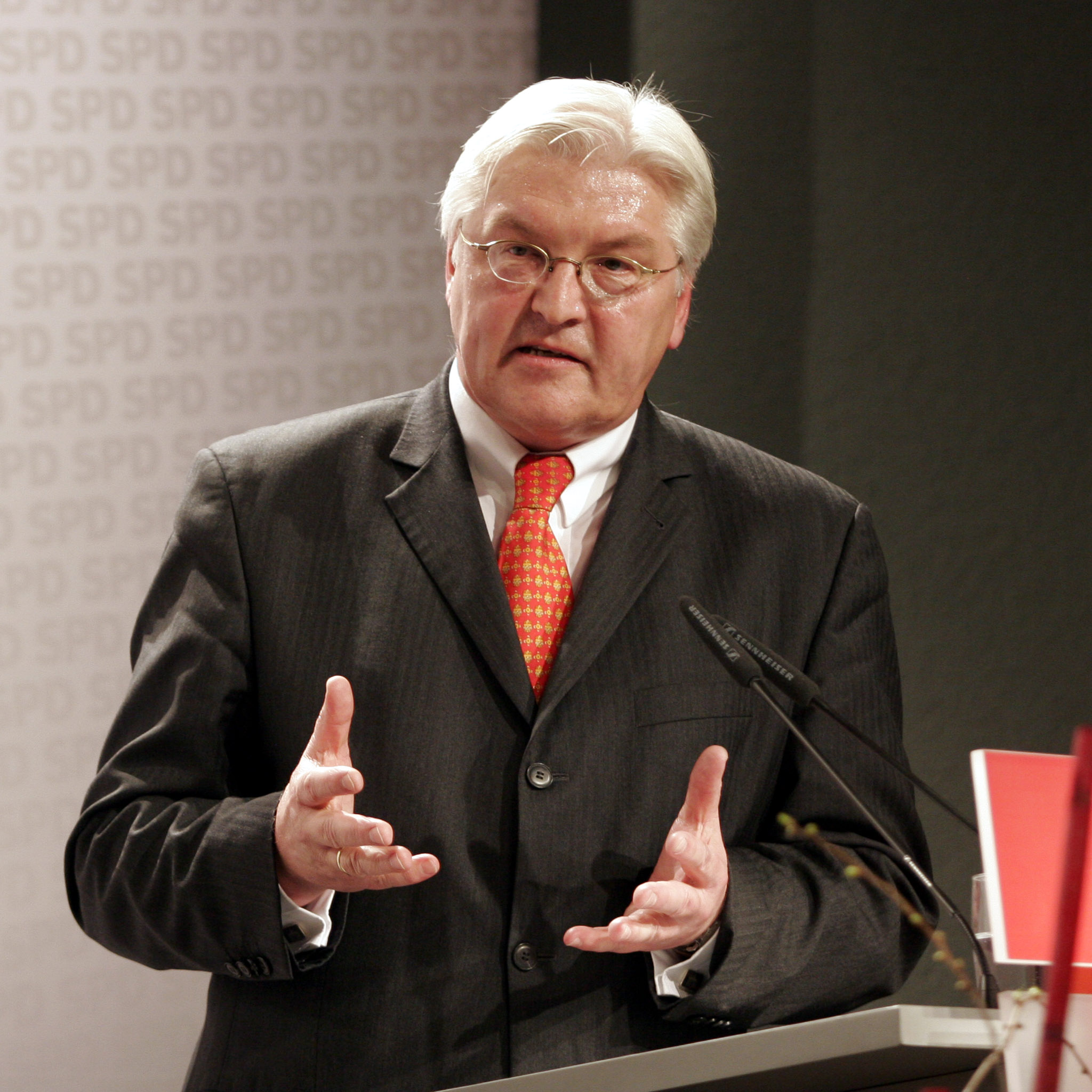
Candidate for chancellorship in 2009: Frank-Walter Steinmeier, minister of the exterior from 2005 to 2009 and again from 2013 to 2017

SPD state leader Andrea Ypsilanti choose to form a minority coalition with the Left in Hesse after a lost state election in January 2008; this decision was heavily criticized by national leaders of the SPD, as Buck, the leader at that time was for the coalition in Hesse and supported Ypsilanti. Beck, who was a popular minister-president, has lost a lot reputation on a national level because of the support. At an emergency session of leaders of the SPD, Beck resigned the chairmanship of the SPD, because after 8 months there was no coalition and Beck was criticized for supporting Ypsilanti. In November 2008, the Landtag in Hesse was dissolved and new elections were held in January 2009. Several other state leaders of SPD have started flirting with The Left and there is a huge struggle in the SPD on how to treat the Left in order to gain Bundesrat seats to be once again a true national party. In November 2008, the SPD was at 25% in national opinion polls, one of the lowest values in recent memory, and there remained rift between two internal factions of the party. One side of the party, the right-wing Seeheimer Kreis, refuses to do coalitions with the Left Party. Members of the right-wing include Frank-Walter Steinmeier and Gerhard Schröder. The other side of the party, the political left of the SPD, whose members include Andrea Ypsilanti and Andrea Nahles, embraces coalitions with the Left. A reason for such struggle with the Left is that the SPD is in a national coalition with the conservative coalition and is in a dual struggle, at first the struggle for not endangering the national coalition with Merkel and endangering a national political crisis that maybe result in further losses for the SPD, and secondly the struggle for not forgetting the roots where the SPD came from because the SPD is left-leaning party, whose political positions have been eaten by the Left party.

Social Democrats lost Germany's federal elections in 2009, meaning the SPD ended up into the opposition for the first time in 11 years. After the 2013 German federal elections, Chancellor Angela Merkel's CDU party formed a new coalition government with the SPD.

After the 2017 federal elections, coalition talks completed in February 2018 and the party held a vote to let its members decide about the new coalition treaty with the CDU and CSU parties. Of all 378.437 members that took part in the vote, 66,02 % (239.604) of members voted for the new coalition treaty while 33,98 % (123.329) of members voted against it, resulting in another grand coalition with the CDU/CSU. Following the decision to confirm the Grand Coalition, the SPD further declined in polls, suffering heavy defeats in all local elections. In mid-2019, the party was scoring 12% in polls, being surpassed by The Union, Alliance 90/The Greens and even far-right Alternative for Germany. During the COVID-19 pandemic, the SPD returned to polling between 14% and 18%, closing the gaps with the Greens for the second place (in some cases, beating them for the second place) and overcoming the far-right. Earlier in December 2019, progressive candidates Norbert Walter-Borjans and Saskia Esken defeated more moderate candidates and were elected co-leaders by the party's membership. Their election raised prospects of the coalition government collapsing and early elections being called, although Reuters reported that the duo would seek to achieve agreement from the CDU/CSU on increasing public spending rather than collapse the government.

=== Comeback with Olaf Scholz (2021-2025) ===
By August 2021, just one month ahead of the 2021 German federal election, the SPD surged to first place in polls. They won a plurality of seats at the 2021 German federal election. Social Democrat Olaf Scholz became the new chancellor in December 2021. Chancellor Scholz formed a coalition government with the Green Party and the Free Democrats (FDP). In the 2024 European Parliament election, the SPD yet again came in third in the elections, this time behind the CDU/CSU and the AfD. By early-2025, the SPD remained third in the polls, clearly behind the CDU/CSU and the AfD.

=== Grand coalition with CDU/CSU (2025-present) ===
In February 2025, the SPD lost 86 seats and secured 120 seats in the German federal election, becoming the third biggest party in the parliament after the CDU/CSU and the far-right AfD. In May 2025, Friedrich Merz, leader of the CDU, formed a coalition government between the CDU/CSU and the SPD (grand coalition). Co-leader of the SPD, Lars Klingbeil, became vice chancellor and finance minister of the new government.

== Leading members ==
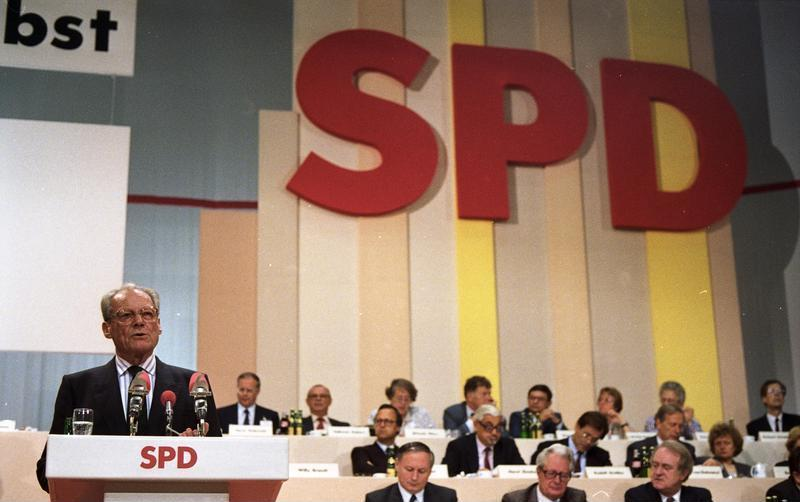
SPD party convention in 1988, with Nobel prize winner Willy Brandt, chairman from 1964 to 1987

=== Chairmen ===
Name	Term	Notes
Socialist Workers' Party of Germany (SAP)
Wilhelm Hasenclever; Georg Wilhelm Hartmann	1875–1876	
Wilhelm Hasenclever; Georg Wilhelm Hartmann; Wilhelm Liebknecht; August Bebel	1876–1878	Central Committee
The party was banned by Anti-Socialist Laws from 22 October 1878 to 30 September 1890.
Social Democratic Party of Germany (SPD), 1890–1933
Paul Singer; Alwin Gerisch	1890–1892	
August Bebel; Paul Singer	1892–1911	
August Bebel; Hugo Haase	1911–1913	
Friedrich Ebert; Hugo Haase	1913–1917	Haase broke away in 1916 to form the USPD
Friedrich Ebert; Philipp Scheidemann	1917–1919	
Hermann Müller; Otto Wels	1919–1922	
Hermann Müller; Otto Wels; Arthur Crispien	1922–1928	Crispien co-opted in September as a representative of the returning USPD
Otto Wels; Arthur Crispien	1928–1931	
Otto Wels; Arthur Crispien; Hans Vogel	1931–1933	
Sopade (party in exile during World War II), 1933–1945
Otto Wels; Hans Vogel	1933–1939	Wels died on 16 September 1939 in his Exile in Paris.
Hans Vogel	1939–1945	
Allied-Occupied Germany (1945–1949)
Otto Grotewohl	1945–1946	Chairman of a Central Committee claiming national authority, chairman of the SPD in the Soviet zone, merged with the Eastern KPD to form the SED in 1946
Kurt Schumacher	6 May 1945 – 23 May 1949	Chairman of the SPD in the British zone, resisting Grotewohl's claims and implementing the formation of the SPD in the new founded Federal Republic of Germany (West Germany) in 1949.
Social Democratic Party of Germany (SPD), 1949–1990
Kurt Schumacher	23 May 1949 – 20 August 1952	Died in office
Erich Ollenhauer	27 September 1952 – 14 December 1963	Died in office
Willy Brandt	16 February 1964 – 14 June 1987	
Hans-Jochen Vogel	14 June 1987 – 29 May 1991	
Chairmen of the refounded SPD in East Germany 1989–1990
Ibrahim Böhme	7 October 1989 – 1 April 1990	Resigned after allegations about Stasi collaboration
Markus Meckel	26 March 1990 – 9 June 1990	Acting leader
Wolfgang Thierse	9 June 1990 – 26 September 1990	
On 26 September 1990 the Social Democratic Party in the GDR dissolve itself and joined the Western Social Democratic Party of Germany and becoming one single party again.
Social Democratic Party of Germany (SPD), since 1990
Hans-Jochen Vogel	26 September 1990 – 29 May 1991	
Björn Engholm	29 May 1991 – 3 May 1993	Resigned after political scandal
Johannes Rau	3 May – 25 June 1993	Acting chairman
Rudolf Scharping	25 June 1993 – 16 November 1995	Elected by a members' vote; the experiment was never repeated
Oskar Lafontaine	16 November 1995 – 12 March 1999	
Gerhard Schröder	12 March 1999 – 21 March 2004	Took over after sudden resignation of Lafontaine
Franz Müntefering	21 March 2004 – 15 November 2005	Resigned after his candidate for party secretary was not chosen
Matthias Platzeck	15 November 2005 – 10 April 2006	Resigned because of health reasons
Kurt Beck	10 April 2006 – 7 September 2008	
Frank-Walter Steinmeier	7 September 2008 – 18 October 2008	Acting leader
Franz Müntefering	18 October 2008 – 13 November 2009	
Sigmar Gabriel	13 November 2009 – 19 March 2017	
Martin Schulz	19 March 2017 – 13 February 2018	
Olaf Scholz	13 February 2018 – 22 April 2018	Acting leader
Andrea Nahles	22 April 2018 – 3 June 2019	First female leader of the party
Manuela Schwesig; Thorsten Schäfer-Gümbel; Malu Dreyer	3 June 2019 – 10 September 2019	Acting leaders
Thorsten Schäfer-Gümbel; Malu Dreyer	10 September 2019 – 1 October 2019	Acting leaders
Malu Dreyer	1 October 2019 – 6 December 2019	Acting leader
Saskia Esken; Norbert Walter-Borjans	6 December 2019 – 11 December 2021	
Saskia Esken; Lars Klingbeil	11 December 2021 – 27 June 2025	
Bärbel Bas; Lars Klingbeil	27 June 2025 – present	

== Well-known politicians in important offices ==
=== German Presidents from the SPD ===
- Friedrich Ebert, 1919–1925
- Gustav Heinemann, 1969–1974
- Johannes Rau, 1999–2004
- Frank-Walter Steinmeier, 2017–present

=== German Chancellors from the SPD ===
- Friedrich Ebert, 1918–1919
- Philipp Scheidemann, 1919 as Reich Minister President
- Gustav Bauer, 1919–1920
- Hermann Müller, 1920 and 1928–1930
- Willy Brandt, 1969–1974
- Helmut Schmidt, 1974–1982
- Gerhard Schröder, 1998–2005
- Olaf Scholz, 2021–2025

=== German Vice-Chancellors from the SPD ===
- Gustav Bauer, 1921–1922
- Robert Schmidt, 1923
- Willy Brandt, 1966–1969
- Egon Franke, 1982
- Franz Müntefering, 2005–2007
- Frank-Walter Steinmeier, 2007–2009
- Sigmar Gabriel, 2013–2018
- Olaf Scholz, 2018–2021
- Lars Klingbeil, 2025–present
