= Internationalist–defencist schism =

Camps in the socialist movement

Internationalist and defencist were the broad opposing camps in the international socialist movement during and shortly after the First World War. Prior to 1914, anti-militarism had been a key principle among most European socialist parties. Leaders of the Second International had even suggested that socialist workers might foil a declaration of war by means of a general strike.

However, when war broke out in August 1914, the leaders of most European socialist parties rallied to the support of their respective countries, while a minority continued to oppose the war. Those in favour of their country's war efforts were variously called 'social patriots' or 'defencists'. Those opposed to the war called themselves 'Internationalists' and were often called 'defeatists' by their opponents.

== Division ==
The 'defencist' camp included many venerable figures of European socialism: Jules Guesde and Édouard Vaillant in France, Gustav Noske and Friedrich Ebert in Germany, Georgi Plekhanov and Ekaterina Breshkovskaia among the Russians. Leaders of the anti-war 'Internationalist' camp included Jean Jaurès (who was murdered for his anti-war stance in 1914), Karl Liebknecht and Rosa Luxemburg, and later also Karl Kautsky and Eduard Bernstein, in Germany, Iulii Martov, Vladimir Lenin, Viktor Chernov and Mark Natanson among the Russians. The anti-war socialists held two international conferences at Zimmerwald and Kienthal in Switzerland in 1915 and 1916.

The defencist–internationalist schism did not necessarily coincide with earlier, pre-existing splits, such as that between reformists and revolutionaries, Revisionists and orthodox Marxists, Bolsheviks and Mensheviks, etc. For example, Guesde and Vaillant in France had belonged to the intransigent, revolutionary left of the Socialist Party, and in 1914, anti-war sentiment was strongest on the far left. Yet both of these veterans were ardent supporters of the French war effort, while the old reformist leader Jaurès opposed the war. Likewise, Kautsky and Bernstein had been on opposite sides during the Revisionism controversy of the 1890s, Kautsky defending orthodox Marxism and Bernstein being the principal exponent of Revisionism; they both joined the anti-war faction. Meanwhile, the left wing Marxists Paul Lensch, Heinrich Cunow and Konrad Haenisch went on to form the Lensch-Cunow-Haenisch group, which argued that the First World War was a revolutionary war against the liberal capitalism of the Triple Entente.

'Defencism' and 'Internationalism' were broad categories; within each camp, there were further differences and divisions. Out-and-out 'Social Patriots' who supported their countries' war efforts unconditionally, including territorial ambitions, were fairly rare, though they included some of the most prominent representatives of the pre-war socialist movement: people like Henry Hyndman, Plekhanov and Guesde. More common was an attitude of conditional support for the war, approving a 'defensive' war but rejecting annexations and indemnities.

Many of the pre-war revolutionary leftists who now rallied to national defence did so not out of simple nationalism, but out of a specifically socialist form of patriotism. They believed that their own state, imperfect though it may have been, was still a better prospect for socialism than the enemy nation. For example the chief theoretician of French socialism, Jean Jaurès, in his articles in L'Humanité in July 1914, argued that the "Radical Republic" that France had become since the Combes ministry had begun substantial democratic institutional reform, allowing for a clear path to socialism, rendering it a lesser evil than Prussian Kaiserism, and that German workers would even benefit from a French victory. In turn the chief theoretician of German socialism, Karl Kautsky, argued that the German Reich's advanced social welfare measures made it worthy of support, and was a lesser evil than Russian Tsarism.

A special case arose in Russia in 1917: After the February Revolution, several Mensheviks and Socialist-Revolutionaries (SRs) who had previously been Internationalists and Zimmerwaldists now favoured 'revolutionary defencism' – continued war effort in defence of the revolution. This was the case with Mensheviks like Fyodor Dan and Irakli Tsereteli, SRs like Avram Gots and Nikolai Avksentiev and Trudoviks like Alexander Kerensky. In 1917 some Bolsheviks took also this position, before Lenin returned to Russia and successfully opposed this view. On the Internationalist side, too, there were divisions. Most Internationalists favoured passive resistance to the war and called for an international peace agreement, 'without annexations or indemnities'. Jaurès, Kautsky, Bernstein, Martov and Chernov belonged to this camp; so, at first, did the Bolshevik Lev Kamenev. A minority led by Lenin advocated 'revolutionary defeatism': instead of seeking a peace agreement that would restore the status quo ante, socialists should seek to convert the 'imperialist war' into a revolutionary 'civil war', with each socialist party working for the defeat of its own country.

== Effects by country ==
The schism caused splits in many European socialist parties. In France, the split between socialists and communists did not occur until 1920. In Germany, the Independent Social-Democrats (USPD) formally separated from the majority Social Democratic Party of Germany (SPD) in 1917, and the more radical Spartacist League formed the nucleus of the post-war German Communist Party (KPD). Italy was a special case: whereas, in most European socialist parties, Defencists predominated (at least at the beginning of the war), in Italy, the majority of the members and most of the leaders of the Socialist Party, from reformists to radicals, were against Italy's entry into the war, while a minority, led by the former Maximalist and future fascist dictator Benito Mussolini, campaigned for Italian intervention and was expelled from the party for it. Only the Serbian socialists remained fairly uniformly anti-war. The debate over conscription in Australia caused the Australian Labor Party split of 1916.

=== Russia ===
Divisions in Russia were especially complicated and affected party alignments during the Russian Revolution. The Mensheviks and Socialist-Revolutionaries were badly divided. A small minority on the right took an out-and-out Social Patriotic stance, even supporting territorial expansion as a war aim. Plekhanov and the 'Grandmother of the Revolution, Breshkovskaia, belonged to this group. Slightly more moderate were Mensheviks like Aleksandr Potresov and SRs like Vadim Rudnev. The Menshevik and SR majority, including Dan, Tsereteli, Abramovich, Liber, Gots, Avksentiev, Zenzinov and so on, were 'Revolutionary Defencists'; they had been Zimmerwaldists and opponents of the war until February 1917 but now favoured limited defensive war.

Some later returned to the Internationalist camp (such as Dan and Abramovich). The Revolutionary Defencists dominated the soviets and the Provisional Government until the October Revolution of 1917. The Menshevik/SR Revolutionary Defencists in the soviet supported the Provisional Government, but with increasing misgivings. Kerensky had been one of them, a Zimmerwaldist until 1917, then a Revolutionary Defencist; however, as, initially, the only socialist in the Provisional Government, he had adopted a more and more unqualified stance in support of the war, in line with his liberal colleagues.

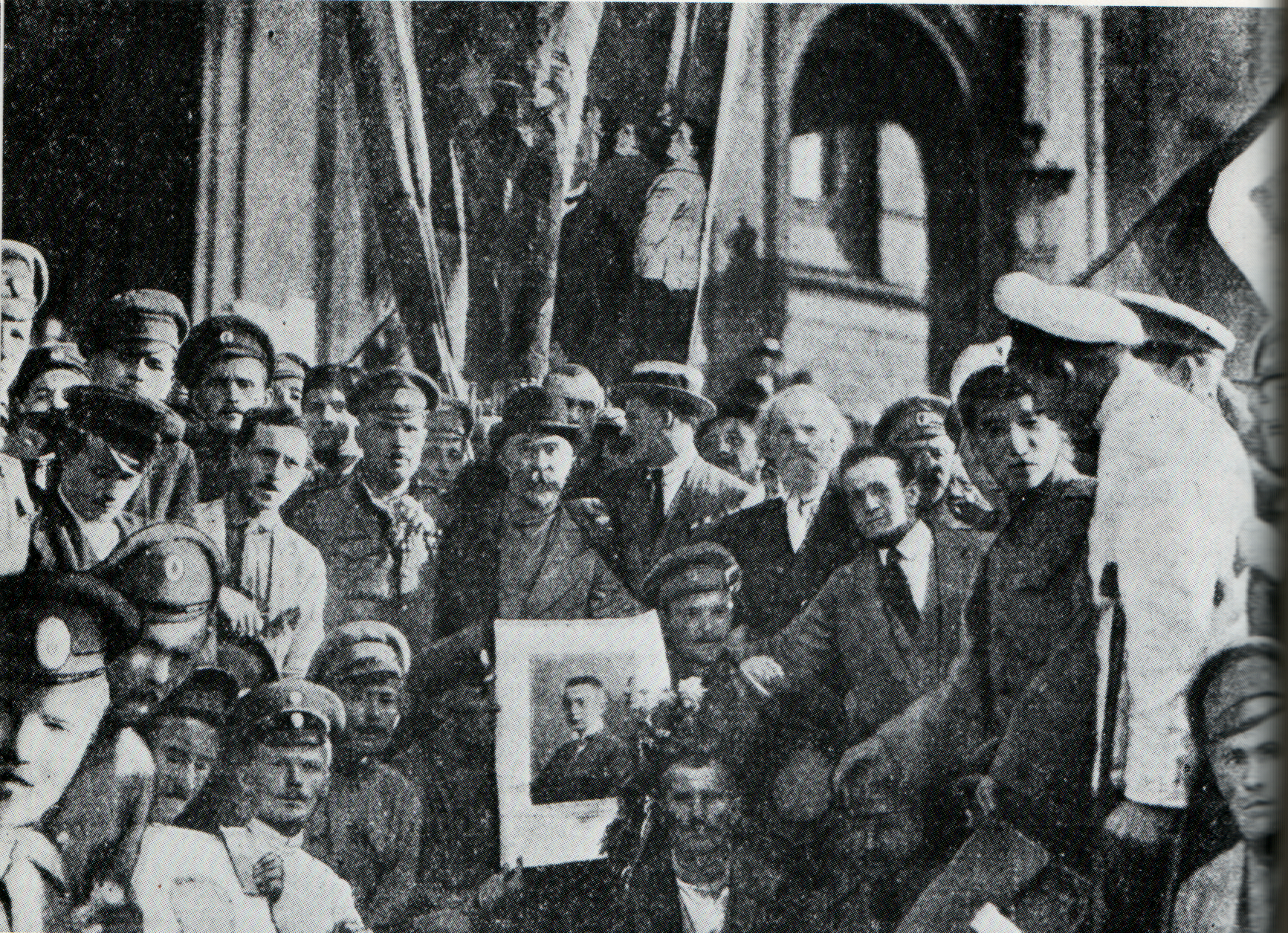
Georgy Plekhanov and Leo Deutsch leading the demonstration in favor of the June military offensive in front of the Defense Ministry in Petrograd, June 1917

To the left of the revolutionary defencists stood Internationalists like Chernov, who collaborated with the soviet leaders and even joined the Provisional Government, although he opposed both a continuation of the war and a coalition with the liberals. More principled in his opposition to the war was the Menshevik Internationalist leader Martov, who, however, was in a minority in his party until the Bolsheviks had taken power. The Mezhraiontsy group, headed by Leon Trotsky, was firmly internationalist but not necessarily revolutionary defeatist; in 1918, Trotsky resigned his ministry rather than sign the harsh peace agreement of Brest-Litovsk proposed by the Germans.

The Left Socialist-Revolutionaries, who counted the veteran Mark Natanson and many young militants among their number, were also firmly Internationalist but broke their short-lived coalition with the Bolsheviks when the latter signed the Treaty of Brest-Litovsk. The Bolsheviks were fairly united in opposing the war, but not all Bolsheviks were comfortable with Lenin's Revolutionary Defeatism. Before Lenin's return to Russia, Joseph Stalin had even briefly adopted a Revolutionary Defencist position. Divisions over the war vitiated the attempts occasionally made, both before and after the October Revolution, to set up an all-socialist government, from the Bolsheviks to the Popular Socialists.

== Post-war impact ==
After World War I was over, divisions over the war could not be healed. Many internationalists wanted nothing to do with the Defencist leaders of the old Second International. Some affiliated with Lenin's communist Third International. A minority, who opposed both communism and the Second International leadership, formed the International Working Union of Socialist Parties, based in Vienna and known as the 'Second-and-a-Half International'. This included many former Internationalists, German Independent Social-Democrats like Rudolf Hilferding, Austro-Marxists like Max and Friedrich Adler, Mensheviks like Dan, centre-left SRs like Chernov and the Left SRs. Eventually this third camp dissolved; some rejoined the majority socialist parties of their countries, others the communists. The split between Defencists and Internationalists continued to fester, however, until the Second World War was on the horizon.

A belated echo of the split was the division among French socialists in the late 1930s over what attitude to take if Hitler invaded Poland. Most French socialists were firmly anti-fascist; though none contemplated the prospect of another war with Germany with joy, they were prepared to take that step if Germany attacked Poland. A minority, however, wanted to maintain peace at any cost. Some were motivated by unconditional pacifism, others by fascist sympathies which subsequently manifested themselves, as in the case of the ex-socialist and future premier of the Vichy régime, Pierre Laval.

== See also ==
- Social chauvinism
- Manifesto of the Sixteen, a defencist declaration that split the international anarchist movement
