= A Contribution to the History of Primitive Christianity =

Work by Friedrich Engels

A Contribution to the History of Primitive Christianity（German:Zur Geschichte des Urchristentums）is a work written by Friedrich Engels in 1894 and later published in Die Neue Zeit between 1894 and 1895. This work mainly compares the similarity between early Christianity and contemporary labour movement.
