= Die Neue Zeit =

German socialist journal (1883–1923)

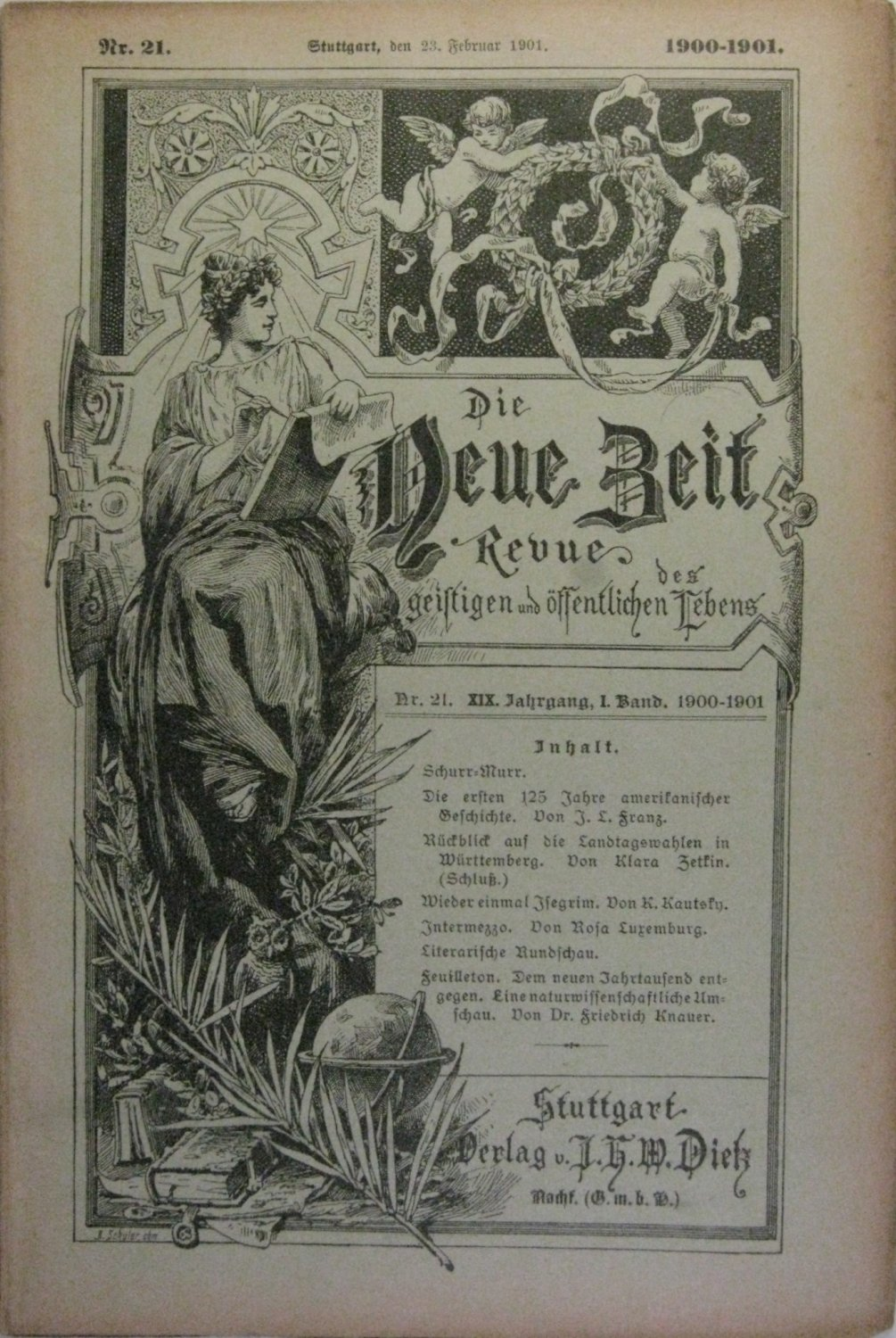
Cover of a 1901 issue

Die Neue Zeit ("The New Times") was a German socialist theoretical journal of the Social Democratic Party of Germany (SPD) that was published from 1883 to 1923. Its headquarters was in Stuttgart, Germany.

== History and profile ==
Founded by leading socialist politicians and theorists, the magazine's first edition was released on 1 January 1883. After the abolition of the Anti-Socialist Laws, the magazine was transformed from a monthly into a weekly on 1 October 1890. In 1901, it became the official magazine of the SPD and its property. The magazine's decline and end came with the hyperinflation of the 1920s. It became the most important organ of the SPD, competing with Sozialistische Monatshefte. It was edited by Karl Kautsky and Emanuel Wurm until their withdrawal from the SPD in 1917. Following that, the more right-wing Heinrich Cunow, who supported the First World War, took over as its chief editor.

Eduard Bernstein's "Problems of socialism" articles where published in the periodical from 1896 to 1898, in which he first elaborated his revisionist Marxist position, sharply criticised by the more orthodox Kautsky. He

Die Neue Zeit was succeeded by Die Gesellschaft, of which the first issue was published on 1 April 1924.

Austrian socialist theoretical journal, Der Kampf, was inspired from Die Neue Zeit.

== Notable contributors ==
- Eduard Bernstein
- Wilhelm Blos
- Heinrich Cunow
- Friedrich Engels
- Paul Ernst
- Konrad Haenisch
- Rudolf Hilferding
- Karl Kautsky
- Karl Korn
- Gustav Landauer
- Paul Lensch
- Wilhelm Liebknecht
- Rosa Luxemburg
- Karl Marx
- Franz Mehring
- Anton Pannekoek
- Alexander Parvus
- Georgi Plekhanov
- Christian Rakovsky
- Friedrich Schrader
- Leon Trotsky, through Kautsky
- Julie Zadek
