= Lensch-Cunow-Haenisch group =

Marxist political faction in Germany

The Lensch-Cunow-Haenisch group was a political faction within the Social Democratic Party of Germany founded in 1915 by anti-revisionist Marxists who despite previously opposing participation in the First World War now supported it. Its name comes from the three principal protagonists: Paul Lensch, Heinrich Cunow and Konrad Haenisch. They followed the initiative of Parvus in advocating a German victory as a positive step for international social democracy. They mobilised Marxist arguments behind the war effort.

In 1907 Parvus had been a critic of German imperialism, publishing Colonial Policy and the Breakdown during the 1907 German federal election, often referred to as the Hottentot Election.
