= Konrad Haenisch =

German politician (1876–1925)

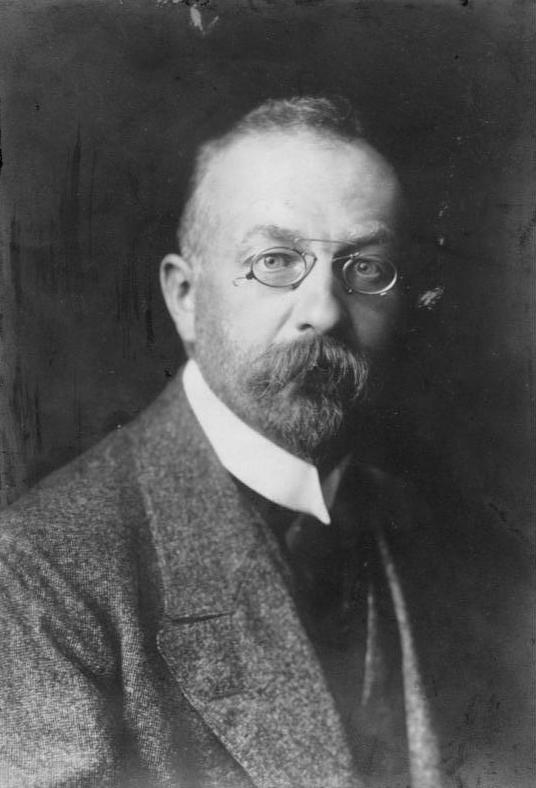
- Haenisch in 1918
- Born: Benno Fritz Paul Alexander Konrad Haenisch; 13 March 1876; Greifswald, Province of Pomerania, German Empire
- Died: 28 April 1925 (aged 49); Wiesbaden, Weimar Germany
- Occupation(s): Politician, journalist

Benno Fritz Paul Alexander Konrad Haenisch (13 March 1876 – 28 April 1925) was a German Social Democratic Party politician and part of "the radical Marxist Left" of German politics. He was a friend and follower (Parvulus in his own words) of Alexander Parvus.

== Life ==
Haenisch was born in Greifswald, Province of Pomerania. He was a first-degree cousin of the famous German sinologist Erich Haenisch.

Haenisch became a socialist while at High School. His conservative family (his mother was a member of the House of Mecklenburg) took him out of school because of this and put him in a psychiatric institution. He escaped and fled to Leipzig where he started a career as a journalist and later editor for social democratic and socialist papers. During that time he became friends with Marxist celebrities like Rosa Luxemburg, Franz Mehring, Karl Kautsky, and especially Parvus, whom he regarded as mentor and friend during his whole life and also during later changes of his political direction.

== During World War One ==
Haenisch initially opposed World War I in 1914, but subsequently supported it. In a speech given to the 1916 SDP conference, he remembered the 'August enthusiasm':

The conflict of two souls in one breast was probably easy for none of us. [It lasted] until suddenly—I shall never forget the day and hour—the terrible tension was resolved; until one dared to be what one was; until—despite all principles and wooden theories—one could, for the first time in almost a quarter century, join with a full heart, a clean conscience and without a sense of treason in the sweeping, stormy song: "Deutschland, Deutschland über alles".

He became famous, during World War I, as a member of the Lensch-Cunow-Haenisch group, a nationalist tendency within SPD which based the support of the SPD for the "war credits" (funding for the German military effort) in the Reichstag on a Marxist theory suggesting that a German victory in World War I could be used by SPD, which was still a dominant force in European socialism, to transform Germany into a socialist state and to trigger socialist revolutions in the defeated countries. His associates in this movement were Heinrich Cunow and Paul Lensch, both former left-wing social democrats and Marxists close to Rosa Luxemburg. He became editor of Die Glocke from 1915.

== Career in the Weimar Republic, death in 1925 ==
When it became evident Germany would lose the war, Haenisch became part of the reformist stream led by later President Friedrich Ebert. In 1919 he became Prussian Minister of education (until 1921) and in 1922 Regional President of the Prussian region of Wiesbaden. Since Wiesbaden was under French occupation he was not allowed to reside there and continued to live in Berlin where he also served as a member of Landtag. Haenisch realized the increasing threat to German Parliamentary Democracy emerging from totalitarian communism and fascism, and became one of the founders of "Reichsbanner", a paramilitary organisation founded to protect the Weimar Republic and rallies of democratic parties like SPD, German Democratic Party and Zentrum.

Haenisch died, aged 49, in Wiesbaden.

== Family and children ==
Haenisch was married to a worker's daughter from Dortmund, and had four sons and a daughter, Elsa, who emigrated with her Jewish spouse to the United States in 1938 and died in Florida in 1988. One of his sons was communist theoretician Walter Haenisch, a victim of Stalin's great purge.

== Works ==
- Ferdinand Freiligrath: Wir sind die Kraft! Auswahl politischer und proletarischer Gedichte. Mit biographischen Skizze und erläuiterndem Nachwort von Konrad Haenisch. 3. Auflage. Gerisch, Dortmund 1910.
- Die Hetze auf die Arbeiterjugend. Aus den Reden des Landtagsabgeordneten Konrad Haenisch in den Sitzungen des Preußischen Abgeordnetenhauses am 11. und 12. Mai 1914. Ebert, Berlin 1914.
- Wo steht der Hauptfeind? Verlag der Internationalen Korrespondenz Baumeister, Berlin 1915.
- Der deutsche Arbeiter und sein Vaterland. Verlag der Internationalen Korrespondenz. Berlin-Karlshorst 1915.
- Sozialdemokratie und nationale Verteidigung. Buchhandlung Vorwärts, Berlin 1916.
- Die deutsche Sozialdemokratie in und nach dem Weltkriege. Mit einem Anhang: Zur Bibliographie der sozialistischen Kriegsliteratur (= Kriegspolitische Einzelschriften. Bd. 6/7). Schwetschke, Berlin 1916.
- Franz Klupsch: Die Judenhetze. Eine schwere Gafahr für den staatlichen und wirtschaftlichen Wiederaufbau Deutschlands. Mit einem Geleitbrief von Konrad Haenisch (Wirtschaft und Volk. Schriften zur Wiederaufrichtung Deutschlands und Genesung unseres Volkes. Hrsg. von der Deutschen Wirtschafts-Politischen Gesellschaft, Berlin). Berlin 1920.
- Neue Bahnen der Kulturpolitik. Aus der Reformpraxis der deutschen Republik. Dietz, Berlin 1921.
- Lassalle. Mensch und Politiker. Mit einem Bildnis Lassalles von Jakob Steinhardt und 10 Faksimile-Beilagen. Schneider, Berlin 1923.
- August Bebel. Schneider, Berlin 1923.
- Johann Plenge: In den Umsturztagen 1918/19. Aus meinem Briefwechsel mit Konrad Haenisch. Mit einem Brief an Philipp Scheidemann vom 8. November 1918. Bredt, Münster (um 1934).
