= Heinrich Cunow =

German politician and theorist (1862–1936)

Heinrich Cunow (11 April 1862, in Schwerin, Mecklenburg-Schwerin – 20 August 1936) was a German Social Democratic Party politician and prominent Marxist theorist.

Cunow was originally against the First World War in 1914 but he changed his viewpoint. In 1915 he joined Paul Lensch and Konrad Haenisch in the Lensch-Cunow-Haenisch group. Cunow argued that German imperialism was progressive as antiquated methods of production by primitive people was swept aside by modernisation and industrial growth. In this period he denounced the statement by the Social Democratic parliamentary group in defence of a universal right of self-determination for all people. Rather than being a natural right, Cunow defended self-determination for nations with a higher and democratic culture, but opposed it when it provided a subterfuge behind which mere national aggrandisement lay hidden. In this he was opposed by Karl Kautsky.

He took over as editor the Social Democratic theoretical journal Die Neue Zeit when Kautsky split to join the Independent Social Democratic Party of Germany (USPD) in 1917 and held the position until 1923 following the merger of the USPD with the Majority Social Democratic Party of Germany. Cunow was appointed in 1919 as an associate professor of social sciences and economic history at the Frederick William University of Berlin.

In 1933, after the Nazi Party came to power, Cunow lost his pension and his writings were publicly burned. On August 20, 1936, he died impoverished and forgotten in Berlin.

== Selected works ==
- Zur Urgeschichte der Ehe und Familie, 1912 – On the prehistory of marriage and family.
- Ursprung der Religion und des Gottesglaubens, 1913 – Origin of religion and the faith of God.
- Die Marxsche Geschichts-, Gesellschafts- und Staatstheorie; Grundzüge der Marxschen Soziologie, 1920/21 – Marxist theory of history, society and the state; principles of Marxist sociology.
- Geschichte und Kultur des Inkareiches; ein Beitrag zur Kulturgeschichte Altamerikas, 1935 – History and culture of the Incan Empire; a contribution to the cultural history of America.
