= Johann Plenge =

German sociologist (1874–1963)

Johann Max Emanuel Plenge
- Born: 7 June 1874; Bremen
- Died: 11 September 1963 (aged 89); Münster, North Rhine-Westphalia, West Germany

Philosophical work
- Era: 20th-century philosophy
- Region: Western philosophy
- School: Hegelianism, nationalism
- Main interests: Sociology

Johann Max Emanuel Plenge (7 June 1874 – 11 September 1963) was a German sociologist. He was professor of political economy at the University of Münster.

In his book 1789 and 1914, Plenge contrasted the 'Ideas of 1789' (liberty) and the 'Ideas of 1914' (organisation). He argued: "Under the necessity of war, socialist ideas have been driven into German economic life, its organisation has grown together into a new spirit, and so the assertion of our nation for mankind has given birth to the idea of 1914, the idea of German organisation, the national unity of state socialism". To Plenge, as for many other German nationalists and socialists, organization meant socialism and a planned economy (central direction). He regarded the war between Germany and England as a war between opposite principles, and believed that the "struggle for victory were new forces born out of the advanced economic life of the nineteenth century: socialism and organization".

== Early life ==
Plenge was born into a prominent patrician family in Bremen. In the early 1890s he studied at Leipzig University under Karl Lamprecht and Karl Bucherer. He then studied under Heinrich Dietzel at the University of Bonn, receiving his doctorate in 1897. Around 1900 he visited Brussels and Paris, completing Gründung und Geschichte des Credit Mobilier (Foundation And History of Crédit Mobilier), which he submitted as his habilitation thesis. At this time he also developed an interest in the work of Henri de Saint-Simon, the French utopian socialist. He was also influenced by Johann Karl Rodbertus, Lorenz von Stein and Houston Stewart Chamberlain. He took an 18-month study tour of the United States from 1903–1905.

== Research Institute for Organisational Studies and Sociology ==
Plenge set up the Research Institute for Organisational Studies and Sociology. In 1921, coffee manufacturer Ludwig Roselius financed the institute with 250,000 Reichsmark capital stock, 30,000 Marks for basic purchases, and another 100,000 Reichsmark for the first five years of operation. Plenge developed a cult of personality around himself, placing a bronze bust of himself in the institute. Philosopher Josef Pieper became his student and then his assistant, although he was threatened with dismissal when he did not show the required degree of hero worship for Plenge.

Plenge was Ph. D. advisor of Kurt Schumacher and an ancestor of today's right-wing tendency in SPD, the Seeheimer Kreis. Plenge had a strong influence; the Marxist theorist and SPD politician Paul Lensch, along nationalistic lines.

== Criticism ==
=== Hayek ===
Friedrich Hayek discusses Plenge in his most popular book The Road to Serfdom (1944).

"Professor Johann Plenge was as great an authority on Marx as Sombart. His book on Marx and Hegel marks the beginning of the modern Hegel-renaissance among Marxian scholars; and there can be no doubt about the genuinely socialist nature of the convictions with which he started."

Later his socialist views became very nationalistic, and he is regarded one of the most important intellectual forebears of National Socialism (Nazism).

== Works ==
- Westerwälder Hausierer und Hausgänger, Duncker & Humblot (= Schriften des Vereins für Socialpolitik 78), Leipzig 1898
- Gründung und Geschichte des Crédit Mobilier. Zwei Kapitel aus Anlagebanken, eine Einleitung in die Theorie des Anlagebankgeschäftes, Laupp, Tübingen 1903
- "Marx oder Kant", Zeitschrift für die gesamte Staatswissenschaft, 1910
- Marx und Hegel, Laupp, Tübingen 1911
- Von der Diskontpolitik zur Herrschaft über den Geldmarkt, Springer, Berlin 1913
- Der Krieg und die Volkswirtschaft, Borgmeyer, Münster 1915
- 1789 und 1914: Die symbolischen Jahre in der Geschichte des politischen Geistes, Springer, Berlin 1916
- Die Revolutionierung der Revolutionäre, Der Neue Geist, Leipzig 1918
- Durch Umsturz zum Aufbau, Munster i, Westf, 1918
- Zur Vertiefung des Sozialismus, Der Neue Geist, Leipzig 1919
- Die Altersreife des Abendlandes, Robert Kämmerer, Düsseldorf 1948
- Cogito ergo sumus. Ed. Hanns Linhardt, Duncker & Humblot, Berlin 1964
