= Paul Lensch =

German politician (1873–1926)

Paul Lensch (31 March 1873 – 18 November 1926) was a war journalist, editor, author of several books and politician in the SPD. From 1912, Lensch was a member of the German Reichstag for the SPD, and in 1919 he became professor of economics at Berlin University.

== Life ==
Lensch was born in Potsdam, Province of Brandenburg. Already in high school he studied Hegel and Marx. After military service he studied economics in Berlin and Strasbourg. In 1900 in Strasbourg he received his doctorate in political science. He then worked as an editor for the newspaper Freie Presse für Elsaß-Lothringen (Free Press for Alsace-Lorraine).

From 1902 he was associate editor of the Leipziger Volkszeitung and next to Rosa Luxemburg, Alexander Parvus, Franz Mehring and Karl Liebknecht he was spokesman for the Anti-revisionist Left in the SPD. From 1908 to 1913 he was editor of the Leipziger Volkszeitung.

In 1912 he was the SPD candidate for the Saxon 22nd constituency (Reichenbach) and was elected to the Reichstag. In 1914 Lensch first opposed the SPD’s approval of war loans, but in 1915, together with Heinrich Cunow and Konrad Haenisch, he formed the Lensch-Cunow-Haenisch group within the SPD, which sought to reach agreement with the majority of the SPD through a defense of the war based on Marxist theory. They developed the theory of war socialism that was published in the Hamburger Echo and other SPD newspapers. From mid-1915 Die Glocke, a magazine founded by Alexander Parvus became the organ of the group.

In October 1917 the SPD split. Lensch became a spokesman for the mainstream SPD, called MSPD (Mehrheits-SPD, "majority-SPD"), which was under the leadership of Friedrich Ebert who had supported the war from the start.

In November 1918 Lensch became an important contact between the Council of the People's Deputies and the military leadership.

Later he withdrew from party politics and became a professor at the University of Berlin. Lensch was also a member of the foreign policy staff of the conservative Deutsche Allgemeine Zeitung, a newspaper belonging to Hugo Stinnes, a famous industrialist and politician.

In 1922, after the merger of MSPD and what was left of USPD (moving SPD to the left), Lensch was expelled from the party. From June 1922 to November 1925 he was editor of the DAZ Lensch, and increasingly became more and more closely associated with conservative opponents of Social Democracy.

In November 1926 Lensch died after a long illness in Berlin.

== Political ideas ==
=== War socialism ===
Lensch believed that World War I proved the failure of capitalism. Since capitalism, the system of a free market economy based on competition, relies on socialist economic regulatory measures (Lensch believed), the superiority and victory of the socialist principle is thus proved for Lensch. The state used a grain monopoly to ensure the nutrition of the population, and Bread cards would then be introduced. This is for Lensch the indication of a principle change in the economy towards a "democratic war socialism" (?). This lack of basic needs during the war is for Lensch basically godsend, because it allows the actions of government planning.

Here he saw the revolutionary character of the war. To Lensch the state is an institution that stands above classes. The state does not regulate any specific class, but is driven by “objective interests”. The war effort showed this and thus reflects the interest of the whole people. According to Lensch socialism is thus not achieved through class struggle, but through national reconciliation. The cultural identity and the economy should be linked together – this is important for the thesis of a "world war as a world revolution". The thesis removes Lensch from the classical Marxist view, although Marxist methodology is still basically applied. Large national industries, a bureaucratically regulating state and a strong work force are for Lensch, the new socialist "Volksgemeinschaft" (unity of a people).

=== World War is a World Revolution ===
The First World War was interpreted by Lensch as a world socialist revolution. It is the continuation of the theory of war socialism. While most in the SPD saw the war as a defensive war against Tsarist Russia, Lensch saw the liberal England as the cause of the war. This because England was the earliest industrialized country in Europe, and that gained England its supremacy. The war against Germany was just an attempt to prevent the opposing Germany's growth and to ensure its own monopoly.

Lensch thus converts the Marxist theory of the class struggle to a national level. England was the state of the bourgeois-capitalist class while Germany now had taken the place of the proletariat.

England with its Parliamentary Monarchy was for Lensch the cause of capitalism. The Calvinist religion and the quest for individual wealth in England led to the creation of the bourgeoisie. The British society has an expansive quest for non-English markets, and therefore establishes a monopoly. The now emerging Germany threatened this supremacy, because it stands as a contrast to the individualistic England, and is instead a strong solidarity-oriented country, with no conventional bourgeoisie. He explains this also with the Thirty Years' War and a lack of unification of Germany in the 19th century.

Germany was no longer as reactionary as in the times of Wilhelmine Empire, but had developed democratic elements, which Lensch believed would be increased. For example, general election had been introduced in Germany - and not in liberal England. Further compulsory school attendance had been introduced, creating a national "cultural community" that was superior to the English one. Also Lensch mentions the German conscription as basically socialist in nature, in contrast to the British one.

Lensch do not deny the deficiencies in Germany, but stressed "the strength of the German proletariat" over that of foreign countries. He pointed out that German trade unions were the strongest and most tightly sealed, and contrasted this with the British labor movement and privileges conceded to the bourgeoisie. In Germany the labor leaders and the workers wanted to keep these privileges from others and therefore supported the Government in the war, inferring from this that the victory of Germany would be a victory for international socialism. A British victory would on the other hand set Germany back for years, and mean the end of socialism.

The ideas of socialism as imagined by Lensch differ from the traditionally Marxist. It is about the creation of a national solidarity, which is characterized by government and moral obligations. With this "positive" interpretation of the historical "exceptionalism" of Germany, in contrast to the liberal model country England, Lensch is not alone. Many authors emphasized at the time the superiority of the German "culture" against the "superficial individualistic-capitalist Western civilization" and Ideas of 1914 against the Ideas of 1789.

The fact that Lensch mixed this with Marxist ideas, creating an authoritarian, nationalist model of socialism, is far from unique. There are similarities of this thinking with Ernst Niekisch idea of National Bolsheviks. Also famous is the work 1789 und 1914: Die symbolischen Jahre in der Geschichte des politischen Geistes by Johann Plenge.

== Other ==
Through the foundation of the Lensch-Cunow-Haenisch Group, Lensch also was close to Alexander Parvus and he was strongly influenced by Professor Johann Plenge, himself the Ph.D. advisor of Kurt Schumacher and the ancestor of the right-wing tendency in today's SPD known as Seeheimer Kreis. Lensch considered himself a Marxist and saw Germany as the 'revolutionary' side of the conflict, with England as the 'counter-revolutionary'.

It is unclear whether Lensch left the SPD in 1920, after being accused of having supported the Kapp Putsch, or was expelled in 1922.

== Books ==
- Paul Lensch, Three Years of World Revolution (1918)
