= Gerhard Hildebrand =

Gerhard Hildebrand (born 1877), was a controversial German socialist.

== Life ==
He was active as a journalist and from 1903 as a member of the Social Democratic Party. He was on the revisionist wing of the party, and many of his articles were published in the Sozialistische Monatshefte revisionist magazine. He came to be viewed as one of the prominent exponents of social imperialism.

His main work was the book Die Erschütterung der Industrieherrschaft und des Industriesozialismus (The shattering of industrial domination and of industrial socialism), published in 1910, in which he doubted that an economy should be socialised completely. He called for the acquisition of colonies, and for a "West European customs union"

His "heretical views" on nationalism and imperialism led to his expulsion from the party, at the convention in Chemnitz on 16 September 1912. The reason given for his exclusion was heavy violation of the basic principles of the party platform. He was defended by major revisionist Social Democrats like Eduard Bernstein and Wolfgang Heine, but the conventions majority voted against Hildebrand. Hildebrand said, he would stay being a Social Democrat, and went on promoting his ideas.

Hildebrand was denounced by Lenin as an "opportunist".

== Works ==
- Die Erschütterung der Industrieherrschaft und des Industriesozialismus. Jena, Fischer 1910
- Sozialistische Auslandspolitik: Betrachtungen über die weltpolitische Lage anlässlich des Marokko-Streites. Jena, Diederichs 1911
- Die Befreiung des Arbeiters und der Arbeit. Berlin 1920

Articles

- "Was ist Kolonisation?" In: Sozialistische Monatshefte, 13 = 15(1909), Heft 1, S. 31 - 36
- "Vorfragen der Kolonisation". In: Sozialistische Monatshefte, 13 = 15(1909), Heft 6, S. 352 - 356
- "Weltpolitische Bilanz". In: Sozialistische Monatshefte, 13 = 15(1909), Heft 11, S. [683] - 688
- "Koloniale Vergleiche". In: Sozialistische Monatshefte, 13 = 15(1909), Heft 15, S. 949 - 954
- "Das tropische Afrika in der Weltwirtschaft". In: Sozialistische Monatshefte, 13 = 15(1909), Heft 21, S. 1358 - 1364
- "Weisse Siedelung in Tropenländern. in: Sozialistische Monatshefte, 14 = 16(1910), Heft 3, S. 162 - 168
- "Kolonisation und Kultur". In: Sozialistische Monatshefte, 14 = 16(1910), Heft 5, S. 293 - 302
- "Australasiatische Rätsel". In: Sozialistische Monatshefte, 14 = 16(1910), Heft 9, S. 555 - 564
- "Die Baumwollfrage". In: Sozialistische Monatshefte, 14 = 16(1910), Heft 10, S. 627 - 635
- "Afrikanische Baumwolle". In: Sozialistische Monatshefte, 14 = 16(1910), Heft 12, S. 742 - 750
- "Die Abänderung von Parteitagsbeschlüssen". In: Sozialistische Monatshefte, 14 = 16(1910), Heft 19/20, S. 1238 - 1244
- "Die Entwickelung Persiens und das Interesse der deutschen Arbeiterklasse". In: Sozialistische Monatshefte, 14 = 16(1910), Heft 23, S. [1473] - 1478
- "Die Weiterentwickelung der deutschen Einfuhr und ihre Bedeutung". In: Sozialistische Monatshefte, 15 = 17(1911), Heft 1, S. 28 - 33
- "Der Aufschwung der russischen Industrie". In: Sozialistische Monatshefte, 15 = 17(1911), Heft 2, S. 106 - 114
- "Was bedeutet das kanadisch-nordamerikanische Handelsabkommen?" In: Sozialistische Monatshefte, 15 = 17(1911), Heft 4, S. 232 - 240
- "Zwischen Amerika und England". In: Sozialistische Monatshefte, 15 = 17(1911), Heft 6, S. 372 - 381
- "Sozialismus, sittliches Bewusstsein und Religion". In: Sozialistische Monatshefte, 15 = 17(1911), Heft 10, S. 627 - 636
- "Die britische Reichskonferenz". In: Sozialistische Monatshefte, 15 = 17(1911), Heft 13, S. 832 - 841
- "Die deutschen Interessen im Ausland". In: Sozialistische Monatshefte, 15 = 17(1911), Heft 18/20, S. 1218 - 1225
- "Wegen groben Verstosses gegen die Grundsätze des Parteiprogramms". In: Sozialistische Monatshefte, 16 = 18(1912), Heft 9, S. [523] - 531
- "Die Entfaltung der Produktivkräfte als Angelpunkt sozialdemokratischer Politik". In: Sozialistische Monatshefte, 16 = 18(1912), Heft 11, S. 661 - 675
- "Warum ich Sozialdemokrat bin und bleibe". In: Sozialistische Monatshefte, 16 = 18(1912), Heft 21, S. 1282 - 1289

== See also ==
- List of Social Democratic Party of Germany politicians
