= Simon Katzenstein =

German politician and journalist

Simon Katzenstein (1 January 1868 – 28 March 1945) was a German writer, politician (SPD) and political lecturer. During 1919/20 he was a member of the Weimar National Assembly, mandated to draw up a post-imperial national constitutions, and precursor to the parliament of a newly republican Germany.

== Life and works ==
Simon Katzenstein was born into a middle-class family and grew up in Gießen, where he attended school. Siegmund Katzenstein (1835–1889), his father, was a timber merchant. His mother, born Sophie Loeb (1835–1918), had also grown up in Gießen. He was born into a Jewish family, but is described in sources as a [religious] dissident, having left the Jewish community (unlike his elder sister, Henriette Fürth) during the 1890s. Between 1885 and 1890 he studied History, Philosophy, Jurisprudence and Public law ("Staatswissenschaft") at the universities of Giessen and Leipzig. As a student he became a member of the Burschenschaft Arminia Gießen (student fraternity) during (or before) 1890. He then embarked on a legal traineeship, training with a law firm in Gießen. That, under most circumstances, would have led to a career as a lawyer. In 1892, however, after two and a half years, and before he had had the opportunity to sit for the national law exams, he was "released from his training contract on political grounds".

After that he made his way as a writer, contributing articles on Social Politics and Politics to appropriate left-of-centre weekly and monthly magazines and journals, notably in Leipzig, Mainz and Berlin. He was also, for a period, involved in worker's support activity as a labour secretary in Mannheim. In 1896 he was sentenced to an eight-year jail sentence for beach of the press law. By 1903 he was evidently at liberty, however, and relaunching himself in Berlin. As well as pursuing his journalistic work he was involved in teaching in the context of the workers' education movement and at trades union and party colleges. He had joined the SPD in 1889, just a year before the retirement of Chancellor Bismarck and the ending, in 1890, of the government ban on the party.

Katzenstein's editorship of the "Der Abstinente Arbeiter" dated back to 1902 or 1903. This was the journal of the Deutscher Arbeiter-Abstinenten-Bund (DAAB) which opposed alcohol abuse principally, Katzenstein and his political allies contended, because alcoholic intoxication among the working classes undermined and deferred victory in the wider class struggle which preoccupied socialist activists at this time. Katzenstein held a succession of leading positions within the DAAB. In 1917 Katzenstein took a paid position as an economist with the Zentralverband deutscher Konsumvereine (loosely, "National Association of the German Consumer Cooperatives"). Throughout the 1920s and 1930s he continued to find time for his political writing, however.

On January 30, 1933, the Hitler government took power and lost no time in transforming Germany into a one- party dictatorship. It quickly emerged that Antisocialism and Antisemitism, hitherto food for toxic populist street politics, were becoming core underpinnings of government strategy. Katzenstein relocated to the Saarland which remained under French military and political control (backed up by a League of Nations mandate) till 1935. In 1935, following a regional referendum result endorsed by the League of Nations, the Saarland reverted to German control, and Katzenstein was again obliged to flee for his life, this time to Sweden. He was still living in Sweden and still actively involved in German socialist politics when the German authorities formally removed his German citizenship in 1940.

== Party politics ==
A member of the resurgent (but still, in the eyes of the political establishment, far from mainstream) Social Democratic Party since 1889, Simon Katzenstein teamed up with Eduard David in 1893 to found the Halle-based "Mitteldeutsche Sonntagszeitung" (Central German Sunday newspaper). The two men had been friends since their student days. Their objective was to win the political support of rural voters in general and "peasant farmers" in particular for socialism.

In 1906 Katzenstein was a founding member of the Party Academy founded in Berlin. It was the first time any political party had set up a training institute for party officials, and the eight lecturers found their work closely monitored by the Prussian police. Although the academy was closed in 1914, the idea was later taken up by other parties of the political left, notably in Germany and the Soviet Union.

Between 1915 and 1919 Katzenstein served as a city councillor for Berlin-Charlottenburg. He was re-elected to the council in 1919 but declined to take up his seat on the council which, in the context of the unfolding "November revolution", would have been operating in uncertain partnership with the Workers' and Soldiers' Soviet of Greater Berlin between November 1918 and the progressive implosion of the Workers' Soviet during the summer of 1919.

Katzenstein did, however, successfully stand for election to the unicameral Weimar National Assembly in January 1919. During the course of the heated dispute over the potentially "dictatorial powers" to be accorded to the German President under the new post-imperial German constitution which the assembly was tasked with preparing, Katzenstein intervened to propose improvements to what became Article 48, setting out the circumstances under which a president might invoke "emergency powers". He proposed that emergency powers might be invoked only "for the restoration of public security" and not simply in the event of "disturbances and disruption" of public order. Katzenstein's proposal was supported by Oskar Cohn of the anti-war Independent Social Democratic Party, who insisted that military officers acting on a president's orders under the circumstances envisaged should not (as hitherto) be left to carry out their orders completely without regard for the law. However, the majority of the assembly did not accept Katzenstein's proposal. During the 1920s and 1930s excessive use and/or misuse of Article 48 would do much to discredit the constitutional arrangements of the so-called Weimar Republic in the eyes of the legally sentient. Katzenstein was also a member of the assembly sub-committee which produced the so-called "Weimar schools compromise" which subsequently attracted criticism from the many vocal advocates of education reform for the way in which, by default, it tended to preserve the status quo of the old imperial education system. However, the January 1919 election had been completely boycotted by the newly launched Communist Party and partially boycotted by the breakaway Independent Social Democratic Party, meaning that on many matters of domestic policy, including education, progressive voices were in the minority both in the National assembly and in its sub-committees. The SPD was the largest single party in the assembly, but its share of the seats fell far short of an overall majority. The "Weimar schools compromise" accordingly followed, for the most part, the instincts and preferences of then Catholic Centre Party and other smaller parties and groupings of the political centre and centre-right.

After going into exile in 1933 Katzenstein involved himself with Sopade, the exiled leadership of the outlawed (in Germany) Social Democratic Party which was concentrated initially in Prague and Paris nut had outposts in a number of other European capitals which became more important for the party leadership after 1938 and 1940.

== Personal ==
Simon Katzenstein's eldest sister was the SPD and women's rights activist Henriette Fürth.

== Output (selection) ==
- "Kritische Bemerkungen zu Bebels Buch: 'Die Frau und der Sozialismus'“, in: Die Neue Zeit. XV. 1886–1897. Ist vol., 1896, Nr. 10, pp. 293–302. accessible inline
- "Freiheit und Ordnung. Ein Versuch zur Abgrenzung der Rechte des Individuums und der Gesellschaft", in: Sozialistische Monatshefte. 1 = 3 (1897), vol. 3, pp. 157–165. accessible online
- "Die organisatorischen Aufgaben der deutschen Arbeiterklasse und die Arbeitersekretariate", in: Sozialistische Monatshefte, 1899, pp 558–566.
- Heimarbeit und Genossenschaftswesen. Vortrag, anläßlich der Heimarbeit-Ausstellung zu Berlin 1906 gehalten von Simon Katzenstein. Genossenschafts-Pionier, Berlin 1906. (=Genossenschaftliche Agitations-Bibliothek 1)
- Moderne Jugendbewegung und Alkoholfrage. Deutscher Arbeiter-Abstinenten-Bund, Berlin 1907. (=Deutscher Arbeiter-Abstinenten-Bund. No 14)
- Der Anarchismus und die Arbeiterbewegung. Verlag der Buchhandlung Vorwärts, Berlin 1908.
- Wofür kämpfen wir? Deutscher Arbeiter-Abstinenten-Bund, Berlin c. 1911.
- Sieg der Abstinenz – Untergang der Getränkearbeiter? Deutscher Arbeiter-Abstinenten-Bund, Berlin 1928. (jointly with Kurt Baurichter)
- Die Aufgaben der Gemeinde im Kampf gegen den Alkoholismus, J. H. W. Dietz, Berlin 1930.
- Henriette Fürth. Versuch einer Würdigung. Zu ihrem 70. Geburtstag gewidmet von ihrem Bruder, Berlin 1931.
