= Karl Höchberg =

German writer and economist (1853–1885)

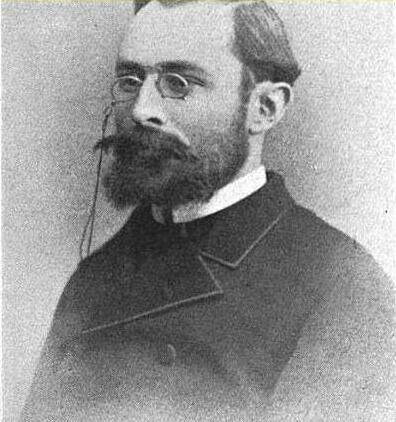
- Karl Höchberg
- Born: 8 September 1853; Frankfurt, Germany
- Died: 21 June 1885 (aged 31)
- Other names: Dr. Ludwig Richter, R.F. Seifert
- Occupations: Writer, publisher, economist
- Known for: Social-reformist writing; Member of the Social Democratic Workers' Party of Germany (SDAP)

Karl Höchberg (8 September 1853 – 21 June 1885) was a German social-reformist writer, publisher and economist, who acted under the pseudonyms Dr. Ludwig Richter and R.F. Seifert.

In 1876, he became a member of the Social Democratic Workers' Party of Germany (SDAP). From 1877 to 1878, he was responsible for editing the Zukunft ("Future") magazine. He was in exile in Switzerland from 1878 onwards, first to avoid conscription to the Prussian military, and then due to the anti-socialist laws. Eduard Bernstein and Karl Kautsky were his secretaries and pupils in Zurich. Afterwards, between 1879 and 1881, he was editor of the Jahrbuch für Sozialwissenschaft und Sozialpolitik ("Yearbook for Social Science and Social Politics").

== Sources ==
- CARTA DE KARL MARX a Friedrich Engels, 1° de Agosto de 1877 (LETTER FROM KARL MARX to Friedrich Engels, August 1st 1877) (Portuguese)
