= A Contribution to the Critique of Political Economy =

Essay by Karl Marx

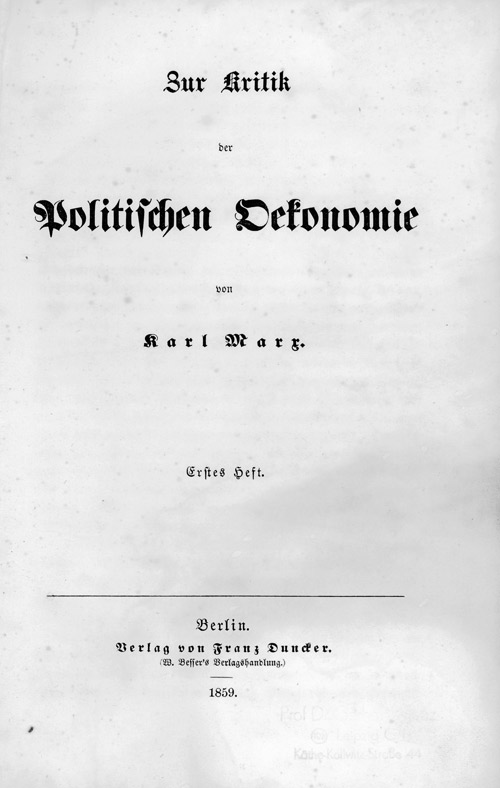
- Author: Karl Marx
- Language: German
- Subject: Political economy
- Published: 1859

A Contribution to the Critique of Political Economy (German: Zur Kritik der Politischen Ökonomie) is a book by Karl Marx, first published in 1859. The book is mainly a critique of political economy achieved by critiquing the writings of the leading theoretical exponents of capitalism at that time: these were the political economists, nowadays often referred to as the classical economists; Adam Smith (1723–90) and David Ricardo (1772–1823) are the foremost representatives of the genre.

== Significance ==
Much of the Critique was later incorporated by Marx into his magnum opus, Capital (Volume I), published in 1867, and the Critique is generally considered to be of secondary importance among Marx's writings. This does not apply, however, to the Preface of the Critique. It contains the first connected account of one of Marx's main theories: the materialist conception of history, and its associated "base and superstructure" model of society, which divides human social development into an economic-technological "base" which "conditions"— not determines — the forms of its political-ideological "superstructure". Briefly, this is the idea that economic factors – the way people produce the necessities of life – conditions the kind of politics and ideology a society can have:

The totality of these relations of production constitutes the economic structure of society, the real foundation, on which arises a legal and political superstructure and to which correspond (entsprechen) definite forms of social consciousness. The mode of production of material life conditions (bedingt) the general process of social, political and intellectual life.

Marx expressed this himself in the preface of the book: "It is not the consciousness of men that determines their being, but, on the contrary, their social being that determines (German: bestimmt, lit. 'determines/specifies/forms/foretells') their consciousness."

== Editions ==
In English, A Contribution to the Critique of Political Economy is available in an edition edited by Maurice Dobb, published by Progress Publishers, Moscow (translation by S. W. Ryazanskaya). Lawrence and Wishart (London), and International Publishers (New York) cooperated in the publication of the Progress Publishers edition.

== See also ==
- Critique of political economy
- Neue Marx-Lektüre
