= Henriette Fürth =

German sociologist (1861–1938)

- Born: Henriette Katzenstein; 15 August 1861; Gießen, Hessen,
- Died: 1 June 1938 (aged 76); Bad Ems, Westmark, Germany
- Occupations: sociologist women's rights activist author-journalist poet
- Political party: SPD
- Spouse: Wilhelm Fürth (1861-1932)
- Children: Elizabeth Fürth (1881-1943); Paula Fürth (1882-1950); Marie Anna Fürth (1884-1944); Walter Fürth (1899-1974); Siegmund Fürth (1899-1975); Charlotte Fürth; Gertrud Fürth
- Parent(s): Siegmund Katzenstein (1835-1889); Sophie Loeb (1835-1918)

Henriette Fürth (born Henriette Katzenstein, 15 August 1861 – 1 June 1938) was a German sociologist, women's rights activist, author-journalist and poet.

After the ban on female participation in political organisation was revoked in 1908, she involved herself in politics in the Frankfurt region (SPD). Though described in one source as "not a believing Jew", it is apparent from sources that Henriette Fürth's Jewish provenance was hugely important to her throughout her life. She died in 1938, before the full horrors of the Shoah unfolded. Two of her daughters died in concentration camps, however.

== Biography ==
Henriette Katzenstein was born in Gießen. After her brother Jacob died in 1867 she was the eldest of her parents' five remaining children. Siegmund Katzenstein (1835-1889), her father, was a Jewish timber merchant. Her mother, born Sophie Loeb (1835-1918), had also grown up in Gießen. Sophie Katzenstein was deeply committed to her Jewish faith, and the children grew up celebrating the Jewish festivals. Siegmund Katzenstein came from a family with strong priestly roots, but wore his religion more lightly, tending towards religious liberalism. He was an actively engaged member of the Progressive Party ("Deutsche Fortschrittspartei") and of the local business community. According to more than one source, Henriette was her father's favourite among his four daughters: she was clearly influenced by his liberal beliefs. Ludwig Börne and the famously liberal Frankfurter Zeitung (newspaper) framed the family's politics. Henriette was not the only one of the five siblings to inherit her father's taste for politics. The Katzenstein girls' only surviving brother, the lawyer Simon Katzenstein, to whom Henriette was particularly close, was a pioneering socialist politician who would die in political exile in Sweden shortly before the end of the Second World War.

After successful completion of her schooling locally, with her father's consent, she accepted the offer of a place at the teachers' training college attached to the Elisabethenschule (secondary school) in nearby Frankfurt. However, before the start of her first term her father withdrew his consent: he said that, being Jewish, she would never be offered a teaching job in a school. Another issue which would have arisen if she had been able to find a job as a teacher in a state school was the convention of those times whereby women teachers were expected to remain celibate or, if they married, to abandon their teaching careers. A few years later Henriette Katzenstein, still aged just nineteen, married a distant cousin, Wilhelm Fürth. He was a businessman, seven years her senior, and related through her mother's family. The couple lived initially in Wilhelm's home town, Darmstadt, and then moved to Frankfurt in 1885. By 1899 Henriette had given birth to eight children, six girls and two boys. The two youngest were twins. However, family matters did not fully consume her energies even at this stage, and she was able to resume the truncated progress of her education.

She attended the Freies Deutsches Hochstift, studying at the applied economics section ("volkswirtschaftliche Sektion"). Encouraged by her brother, in 1890 she began to publish articles of "social criticism", and over time was able to contribute usefully to the household budget from her talks and written pieces. Using the pseudonym G.Stein, she also began to contribute articles on "Jewish themes". Other topics that she favoured included (but were by no means restricted to) mother and child protection, household economics, population reduction, combating sexually transmitted diseases and compulsory celibacy for certain classes of career women, along with votes for women. Overall she is believed to have published around 200 articles and 30 more substantial works.

Henrietta Fürth represented that part of the proletarian women's movement that was oriented towards the SPD. As early as 1896, she distanced herself from the formidable Clara Zetkin when she rejected the ideal of a separation between the "bourgeois" and "proletarian" women's movements. Her own economic situation was conventionally middle class: for a time the Fürths employed two household servants. However, as her husband's leather wholesaling business declined and then, in 1901, went bankrupt she had to go out to work, first as a housing inspector and later as a paid secretary with the "Israelitische Hilfsverein". She was subsequently employed as a journalist and in public relations work for the National Private Welfare Centre ("Zentrale für private Fürsorge", as it was then known). Around this time she also teamed up with Bertha Pappenheim, founding the "Weibliche Fürsorge" to work on women's welfare issues, but, on account of "considerable differences" between the two women, little "fruitful collaboration" came of the partnership.

Between 1897 and 1915 the Sozialistische Monatshefte published 13 substantial articles by Fürth. From 1901 till 1907 she was also a regular contributor to the publication's special "Women's Movement" ("Frauenbewegung") section, reporting on developments both domestically and abroad. Her last major publication, appearing in 1929, was entitled "Die Regelung der Nachkommenschaft als eugenisches Problem" (loosely, "Regulating descendency issues as a problem in eugenics"). Influenced by contemporary discussion of Neo-Malthisianism she had long stressed the importance of social policy measures for the improvement of public health. Now, in addition to the rational application of modern methods of contraception and advocacy of pre-marital health-certificates "in very precisely defined and limited circumstances", she was suggesting sterilisation in the case of inherited serious illness.

In 1905 Fürth became a founding member of the Berlin group for the Deutscher Bund für Mutterschutz (loosely, "Association for Mothers' Protection"). She was a member of the "Deutsches Gesellschaft zur Bekämpfung der Geschlechtskrankheiten" ("... for combatting sexually transmitted diseases"). She later became the first woman to be accepted for membership of the German Sociological Association. During the First World War, with her daughters, Henriette Fürth set up meal kitchens for the urban poor. in political terms, she backed the party leadership. Both her sons fought in the army and returned badly wounded. After the war Fürth continued her hands-on welfare work with renewed energy.

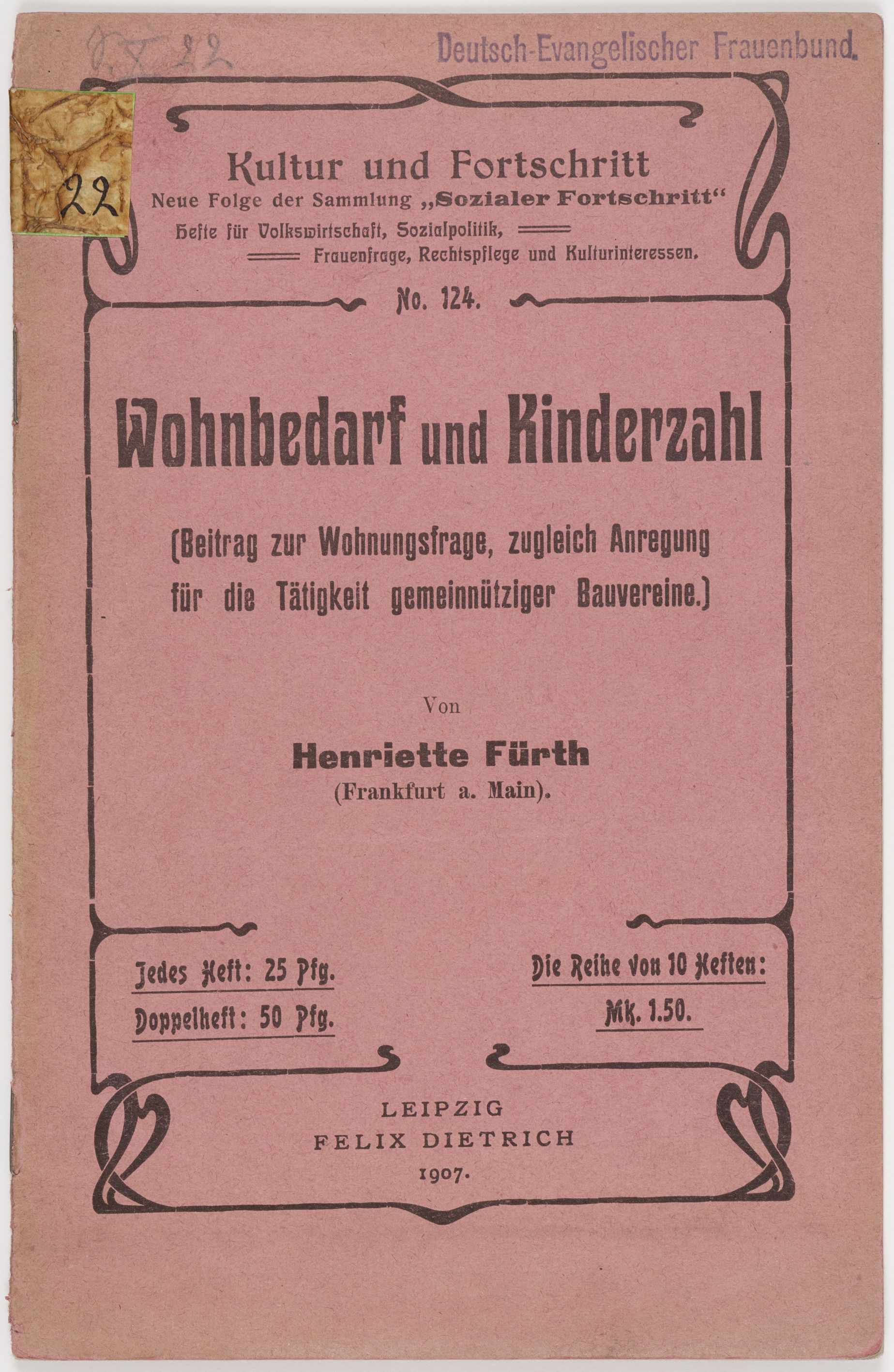
Henriette Fürth, "Wohnbedarf und Kinderzahl", Leipzig 1907.

Military defeat was followed by a wave of revolutions in the German ports and cities, widespread economic destitution and a new republican constitution whereby all citizens were eligible for public office, without discrimination, based on their abilities. Gender discrimination toward female civil servants was also abolished (§ 128). Between 1919 and 1924 Henriette Fürth served as an SPD Frankfurt city councillor. According to one source she stood, unsuccessfully, as a candidate for membership of the "National Assembly". On the city council she was a member of the Finance Committee and also held positions of responsibility in respect of the schools service, health and nutrition. She also set up a free legal advice office. It seems to have been a cause for permanent regret by Fürth that she herself had never received a university education. She was now nevertheless able to accept an invitation to join the oversight board ("Kuratorium") of Frankfurt University.

Fürth also engaged with the Frankfurt based Institute for the Common Good ("Institut für Gemeinwohl") and the socialist "Workers' Welfare" organisation ("Arbeiterwohlfahrt" / AWO).

The National Socialists took power in January 1933 and lost no time in transforming Germany into a one-party dictatorship. Antisemitism, till now little more politically than the basis for shrill offensive sloganising, quickly became a core underpinning of government strategy. Henriette Fürth was quickly stripped of all her offices and then served with a "Berufsverbot" (loosely, "professional ban"). She had been widowed the previous year, and now moved to Bad Ems where she lived quietly in the house of her son-in-law, the district rabbi Friedrich Laupheimer (1890-1965). When she died there on 1 June 1938 her death, in Hitler's Germany, went largely unnoticed at the time.

== Family ==
Two of Henriette Fürth's daughters married Eduard Adelaar (1879–1943) and Henri Adelaar (1881–1944) two Dutch brothers from Deventer. In 1940 it became clear that this time the Netherlands would not be able to stay out of the war. During the occupation the German authorities applied race laws that had already been implemented in Germany. Citizens were required to demonstrate that none of their four grandparents had been Jewish. The Adelaars were deported. Elizabeth Adelaar-Fürth was killed at Sobibór on 16 July 1943. Marie Anna Adelaar-Fürth was killed at Sobibór or at Auschwitz in 1943 or 1944. Henriette Fürth's other six children managed to escape with their families to Palestine or England.

== Celebration (selection) ==
- A street in Frankfurt-Schwanheim is named after Henriette Fürth.
- There is a Henriette Fürth street in Gießen.
- In 1931, on her seventieth birthday, Henriette Fürth was honoured with the award of the Ehrenplakette der Stadt Frankfurt am Main. In celebration of the same anniversary she received an "Ehrenurkunde" award from the University of Frankfurt.
- The new regional party head office in Gießen at Grünberger Straße 140 has carried her name since 27 January 2007 (the anniversary of the liberation of Auschwitz).

== Output (selection) ==
- Die Fabrikarbeit verheirateter Frauen, Frankfurt a. M. 1902.
- Die geschlechtliche Aufklärung in Haus und Schule, Leipzig 1903.
- Kulturideale und Frauentum, Leipzig 1906.
- Wohnbedarf und Kinderzahl. Beitrag zur Wohnungsfrage, zugleich Anregung für die Tätigkeit gemeinnütziger Bauvereine. Leipzig 1907.
- Die Berufstätigkeit des weiblichen Geschlechts und die Berufswahl der Mädchen, Leipzig 1908.
- Die Mutterschaftsversicherung, Jena 1911.
- Staat und Sittlichkeit, Leipzig 1912.
- Kleines Kriegskochbuch. Ein Ratgeber für sparsames Kochen, Frankfurt a. M., 1915.
- Die Bekämpfung der Geschlechtskrankheiten als bevölkerungspolitisches, soziales, ethisches und gesetzgeberisches Problem, Frankfurt a. M. 1920.
- Das Bevölkerungsproblem in Deutschland, Jena 1925.
- Die Regelung der Nachkommenschaft als eugenisches Problem. (Schriften zur Psychologie und Soziologie von Sexualität und Verbrechen, Bd. 2). Stuttgart 1929.
- Streifzüge durch das Land eines Lebens – Autobiographie einer deutsch-jüdischen Soziologin, Sozialpolitikerin und Frauenrechtlerin (1861‒1938), Schriften der Kommission für die Geschichte der Juden in Hessen XXV, Wiesbaden 2010, ISBN 978-3-921434-30-7.
