= Joseph Bloch (socialist) =

German political theorist

Joseph Bloch was a German philosopher, political theorist, journalist and revisionist socialist. In 1890 he shared a correspondence with Friedrich Engels in which Engels elaborated on the materialist conception of history. From 1897 to 1933 Bloch was the editor of the revisionist socialist publication Sozialistische Monatshefe. Bloch was one of the most influential members of the right wing of Germany's Social Democratic Party.

== Life ==
Joseph Bloch was born in Königsberg, East Prussia to an Orthodox Jewish Family. Bloch received his doctorate in philosophy while working under the philosopher Paul Hensel in 1907 at the Friedrich-Alexander University of Erlangen-Nuremberg.

Bloch was part of the revisionist wing of the Social Democratic Party. He was critical of Orthodox Marxism, particularly the idea that the end of capitalism was oncoming and inevitable. Bloch was an advocate for colonialism, and was opposed to the British Empire.

During World War I, Bloch joined the pro-war faction of the split Social Democratic Party. He was a proponent of Burgfriedenspolitik, which advocated for a political truce between the elected parties of the Reichstag and unified front of all parties in favor of the German war effort.

After the rise of the Nazi Party, Bloch fled Germany and moved to Prague, where he died in 1936.

== Web Links ==
Articles by Josehh Bloch in Sozialistischen Monatshefte Joseph Bloch
