= Sozialistische Monatshefte =

German socialist journal (1897–1933)

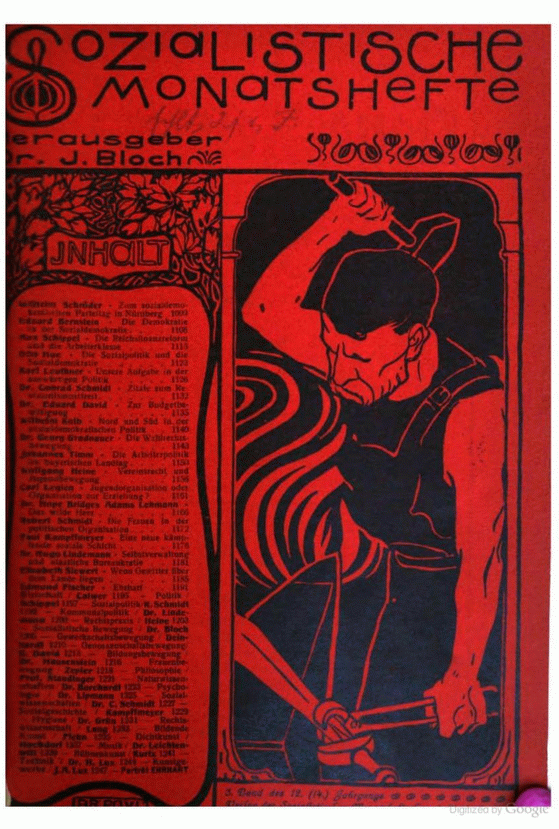
Title page of the Sep 1908 issue

Sozialistische Monatshefte (German: [zotsi̯aˈlɪstɪʃə ˈmoːnatsˌhɛftə], "Socialist Monthly Bulletins") was a German journal edited by Joseph Bloch from 1897 to 1933 and published by the Verlag der Sozialistischen Monatshefte in Berlin.

== History and contents ==
It was close to the revisionist wing of the Social Democratic Party of Germany. It was not controlled by the party and provided a space for debates within the labor movement. Its opponents were representatives of the revolutionary viewpoint as well as the center of the party; they regarded the Monatshefte as the journalistic "center of international revisionism".

The journal was originally founded in 1895 by Johannes Sassenbach as Der sozialistische Akademiker - Organ der sozialistischen Studirenden und Studirten deutscher Zunge (The Socialist Academic - Organ of the Socialist Students and German Speaking Academics). Two years later there were disagreements and Sassenbach left the editorial office. From then on Joseph Bloch continued the journal under the title Sozialistische Monatshefte as chief editor in July 1897, restarting the volume count. Since 1903, the Sozialistische Monatshefte had been a GmbH company with 20,000 German gold marks of capital. Shareholders were Jakob Bamberger (5,999 marks), Eduard Bernstein (2,000 marks), Joseph Bloch (6,000 marks, of which, however, 5,000 marks came from Leo Arons). Charles Hallgarten also supported the magazine, for example with 5,000 marks in 1905.

The magazine was independent of the SPD. It first appeared monthly, fortnightly from the beginning of 1908 to 1922, and then monthly again. The magazine was close to the political viewpoint of the publisher, the revisionist wing of the SPD, but also offered room for representatives of other views, including some anarchists and sympathizers of Labor Zionism. The latter was rejected within the SPD because of his ideas of settlement colonialism in Palestine, but the Monatshefte did not share the SPD's strict colonial criticism. In 1902, August Bebel strongly opposed the magazine and believed that the newspaper was "outside the party". However, a petition to punish publication in the Monatshefte by party exclusion was unsuccessful at the Leipzig Party Congress of 1909. In 1913, the SPD's party committee again considered the question of whether party members could publish in the Monatshefte Issues. Philipp Scheidemann describes it as a meeting point: "where everything is gathered that can give satisfaction to the opponents of our party".

The Monatshefte had great significance for the struggle for recognition of the consumer cooperative movement as one of three pillars (party, trade unions, consumer cooperatives) in the labor movement. This included not only the essays in the main section, by Adolph von Elm and others, but also regular reports in the section Genossenschaftswesen (Consumer cooperative movement). Another fixed component was the column Frauenbewegung (Women's Movement) supervised by Wally Zepler. In addition, the Monatshefte published belletristic texts, for example, 17 novellas by the West Prussian writer Elisabeth Siewert appeared between 1908 and 1923.

The journal contained the supplements The Socialist Student (nine issues in total) and Documents of Socialism.

Notable contributors included Julius Bab, Eduard Bernstein, Gertrud David, Eduard David, Adolph von Elm, Henriette Fürth, Wolfgang Heine, Gerhard Hildebrand, Max Hochdorf, Erwin Marquardt, Max Nettlau, Paul Kampffmeyer, Julius Kaliski, Gustav Landauer, Hope Bridges Adams Lehmann, Élisée Reclus, Karl Renner, Rosa Schapire, Max Schippel, Conrad Schmidt, Anna Siemsen, Heinrich Spaemann, Felix Stössinger, Franz Staudinger, Georg von Vollmar, Max Klesse.
