= Eduard Bernstein =

German politician and theorist (1850–1932)

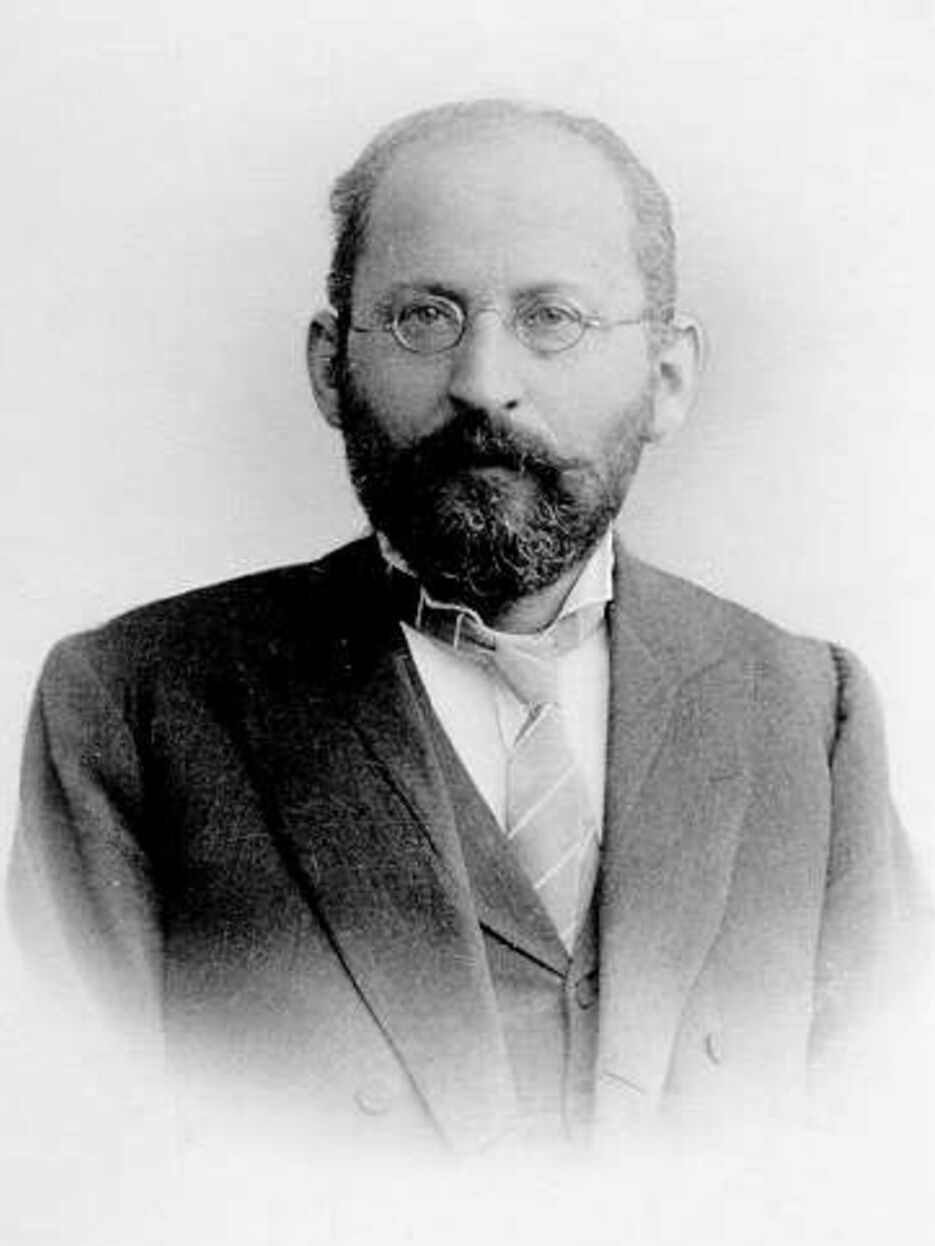
- Bernstein, c. 1890s

Member of the Reichstag from Brandenburg
- In office 7 June 1920 – 20 May 1928
- Constituency: Potsdam (Teltow-Beeskow-Charlottenburg)

Member of the Imperial Reichstag from Silesia
- In office 13 January 1912 – 10 November 1918
- Preceded by: Otto Pfundtner
- Succeeded by: Reichstag dissolution
- Constituency: Breslau-West
- In office 31 October 1901 – 25 January 1907
- Preceded by: Bruno Schönlank
- Succeeded by: Otto Pfundtner
- Constituency: Breslau-West

Personal details
- Born: 6 January 1850 Schöneberg, Kingdom of Prussia
- Died: 18 December 1932 (aged 82) Berlin, Free State of Prussia, German Reich
- Party: SDAP (1872–1875); SPD (1875–1917); USPD (1917–1919); SPD (1918–1932)
- Other political affiliations: SAG (1915–1917)

Eduard Bernstein (German: [ˈeːduaʁt ˈbɛʁnʃtaɪn]; 6 January 1850 – 18 December 1932) was a German politician and socialist theorist. A member of the Social Democratic Party (SPD), Bernstein is best known for his reformist challenge to Marxism known as evolutionary socialism or revisionism, in which he questioned the revolutionary predictions of Karl Marx and advocated for a gradual, parliamentary path to socialism. His political and theoretical work played a significant role in the development of social democracy and democratic socialism.

Born into a lower-middle-class Jewish family in Berlin, Bernstein became active in socialist politics in his early twenties. He spent years in exile in Switzerland and London during the period of the Anti-Socialist Laws in Germany, where he became a close associate of Friedrich Engels. During his time in London, his interactions with the reformist Fabian Society and his observation of the stability of late Victorian capitalism led him to question key tenets of orthodox Marxism.

After Engels's death in 1895, Bernstein began to publicly articulate his revisionist views. In his most influential work, Evolutionary Socialism (1899), he rejected the Hegelian dialectical method and disputed the Marxist predictions of the inevitable collapse of capitalism, the disappearance of the middle class, and the increasing immiseration of the proletariat. Instead, he argued that socialists should work for gradual social and political reforms through democratic institutions. His famous aphorism, "the goal is nothing, the movement everything," encapsulated his focus on the practical, democratic progress of the socialist movement over a dogmatic adherence to a revolutionary goal.

Although his views were officially condemned by the SPD, which maintained its orthodox Marxist Erfurt Program, the party's practical policies were largely reformist, reflecting the reality Bernstein described. His work sparked major debates within the international socialist movement, pitting him and his supporters against orthodox Marxists like Karl Kautsky and radicals like Rosa Luxemburg. During World War I, Bernstein's pacifist principles led him to break with the SPD's pro-war majority and co-found the anti-war Independent Social Democratic Party (USPD), though he rejoined the SPD after the war. He served in the Reichstag during the Weimar Republic, where he continued to advocate for democracy and peace. He died in Berlin in late 1932, weeks before the Nazi seizure of power.

== Early life and political beginnings ==
Eduard Bernstein was born in Schöneberg (now part of Berlin) on 6 January 1850, a time of political reaction in Germany following the failure of the Revolutions of 1848. He was the seventh of fifteen children born to Jakob Bernstein, a railway engine driver, and his wife, Johanne. His family was of Polish-Jewish origin, though they had been secular for two generations; they celebrated Christmas as a German rather than a religious holiday. This environment fostered in Bernstein a skeptical worldview from a young age. The family's income was modest, placing them in the "genteel poverty" of the lower middle class, or petty bourgeoisie. His uncle, Aaron Bernstein, was a prominent liberal journalist and the author of popular science books.

At sixteen, Bernstein left school without finishing Gymnasium due to his family's financial situation and began an apprenticeship at a Berlin bank. He worked as a bank clerk from 1869 until 1878, a profession that provided a livelihood but did not capture his primary interests. His real education was self-directed, and he developed intellectual pursuits in theatre, poetry, and philosophy.

Bernstein's political awakening occurred during the Franco-Prussian War of 1870–1871. Initially a patriot, he became sympathetic to the anti-war stance of socialist leaders August Bebel and Wilhelm Liebknecht after they were accused of treason. In 1872, after reading works by Ferdinand Lassalle and being particularly impressed by a speech from the socialist agitator Friedrich Fritzsche, Bernstein and his friends joined the Social Democratic Workers' Party (SDAP), known as the "Eisenachers" for the town where they were founded. He quickly became a skilled public speaker and an active party member, undertaking grueling speaking tours and engaging in debates with the rival Lassallean socialist party.

The two most influential books on the young Bernstein were Karl Marx's The Civil War in France, an exaltation of the Paris Commune, and Eugen Dühring's Critical History of National Economy and Socialism. His enthusiasm for Dühring's work proved contagious, and he was instrumental in popularizing Dühring's ideas within the socialist movement, even introducing them to Bebel. This early attachment to Dühring's thought, a blend of positivism and idealism, would later be exorcised by Friedrich Engels's sharp critique, Anti-Dühring.

Amidst government harassment and internal divisions, the Eisenachers and the Lassalleans recognized the need for unity. In 1875, the two factions merged at a congress in Gotha. The twenty-five-year-old Bernstein was a delegate to the preliminary conference and participated in the creation of the unified party, which would become the Social Democratic Party (SPD). The resulting Gotha Program was a compromise between Marxist and Lassallean ideas, which drew a sharp critique from Marx himself. Bernstein later acknowledged that the Eisenachers, himself included, had an inadequate grasp of Marxist theory at the time.

== Exile (1878–1901) ==
In 1878, following two assassination attempts on Emperor Wilhelm I, Chancellor Otto von Bismarck enacted the Anti-Socialist Laws, which banned socialist organizations, meetings, and publications. Just before the law took effect, Bernstein accepted an offer to become the private secretary to Karl Höchberg, a wealthy socialist sympathizer, and moved to Zurich, Switzerland, in October 1878. What he expected to be a temporary stay became an exile of over twenty years.

=== Zurich ===
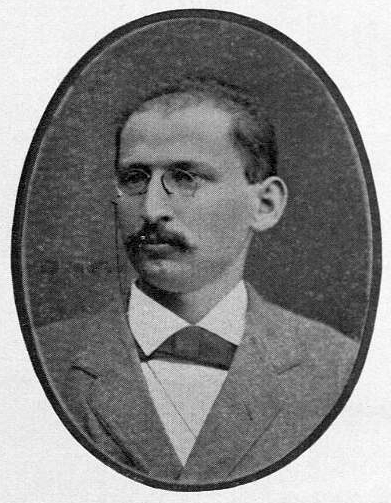
Bernstein in 1878

In Zurich, Bernstein worked with Höchberg on various publishing projects. Their first enterprise, a reprint of Karl Christian Friedrich Krause's Quintessence of Socialism, aimed to convert the intelligentsia to socialism, a tactic of "permeation" that Marx disdained. Höchberg was an avid Darwinian, and Bernstein's first task was to assist him with a work attempting to prove that Darwinian theory could explain the origins of music and aesthetic senses. During this period, Bernstein encountered Engels's Anti-Dühring, a book which he recalled "converted me to Marxism" and made him a "zealous exponent of orthodoxy as he then understood." Engels's work, with its own engagement with Darwinian theory, likely strengthened Bernstein's conviction in the validity of evolutionary thought.

In 1879, Bernstein became embroiled in a controversy that caused serious friction with Marx and Engels, whom he had never met. He had a minor role in the publication of an anonymous article in a new Yearbook for Social Science, financed by Höchberg. The article, written by Karl Flesch and revised by Höchberg, criticized the SPD for its proletarian focus and its "hatred of the bourgeoisie". Marx and Engels were furious, believing the article represented a bourgeois takeover of the party's organ. Engels accused Bernstein of being a key figure in this "trio of Zurichers" and demanded that Höchberg be expelled from the party.

Despite this incident, the SPD established its official, albeit illegal, newspaper, Der Sozialdemokrat, in Zurich in September 1879. Bernstein was active with the paper from the start. Anxious to clear his name with Marx and Engels, he and Bebel traveled to London in December 1880. The visit was a success; Bernstein won the full confidence of the "Londoners", and his relationship with Engels grew into a close friendship and a lifelong correspondence. In January 1881, Bebel appointed Bernstein editor of Der Sozialdemokrat. Under his leadership, and with Engels as a frequent adviser, the paper became, in Engels's words, "unquestionably the best newspaper this party has ever had." During his Zurich years, Bernstein became one of the key members of the SPD, and his circle of friends included future socialist luminaries like Karl Kautsky. Bernstein and Kautsky became close friends, carefully studying the major tracts of Marxism together, and Bernstein was undoubtedly exposed to Kautsky's intense interest in Darwinism.

=== London ===
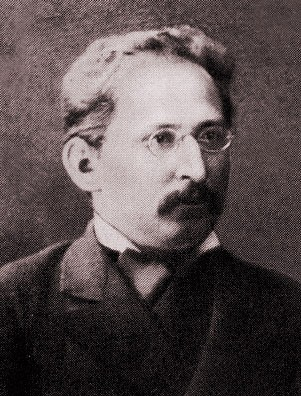
Bernstein, c. 1880

In 1888, under pressure from Bismarck, the Swiss government expelled the staff of Der Sozialdemokrat. Bernstein and his colleagues relocated to London, which became his home for the next thirteen years. He continued to edit the paper until the Anti-Socialist Laws lapsed in 1890. With the SPD now able to operate legally in Germany, the exiled paper was no longer needed, and Bernstein, still under indictment in Germany, found himself without his editorial post. He began making a living as a freelance writer and London correspondent for the SPD's new official newspaper, Vorwärts, and Kautsky's theoretical journal, Die Neue Zeit.

The 1890s were a crucial decade for Bernstein's intellectual development. He spent much of his time in the reading room of the British Museum, the same place Marx had worked for so long. He was responsible for the tactical sections of the SPD's new Erfurt Program of 1891, which was largely Marxist in its theoretical sections drafted by Kautsky. He also undertook a major historical work, Sozialismus und Demokratie in der grossen englischen Revolution (Socialism and Democracy in the Great English Revolution), published in 1895 as the final volume of The History of Socialism. A pioneering study of the English Civil War from a social and economic perspective, the book was an original contribution to scholarship, particularly for his "discovery" of the communist thinker Gerrard Winstanley. His other major work of this period was a highly critical political biography of Ferdinand Lassalle, which aimed to dismantle the "Lassalle Legend" within the German labour movement.

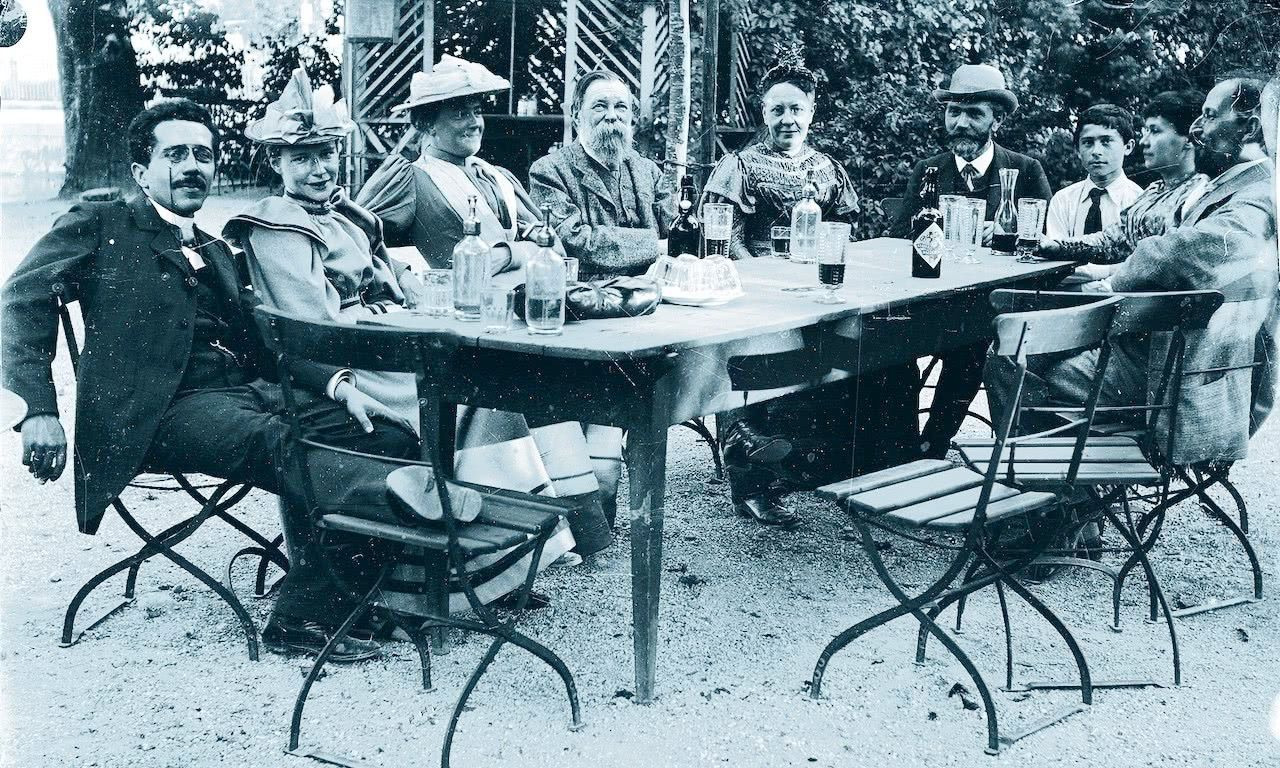
Bernstein (on far right) at the Third Congress of the Second International in Zurich in 1893, with Friedrich Engels, Clara Zetkin, August Bebel, and others.

Throughout his early years in London, Bernstein remained in the shadow of Engels, who was the preeminent authority on Marxism. When Engels died in August 1895, he named Bernstein as one of his literary executors, a sign of complete confidence. It was only after Engels's death that Bernstein felt free to publicly question the orthodox Marxism he had inherited. His intellectual interests were broad; during the 1890s, simultaneous with his turn to revisionism, he intensified his study of Darwinism and natural science. He translated a lecture by the Canadian-British biologist and socialist Grant Allen, "A Disciple of Darwin as Advocate for Socialism," reviewed books on evolutionary theory, and engaged in polemics against social Darwinists who sought to use Darwinism to justify laissez-faire capitalism.

Bernstein's time in England had a profound impact on his thinking. He observed a stable, prosperous capitalist society with strong democratic traditions and a reformist, rather than revolutionary, labour movement. His experience convinced him that "the idea of a once-and-for-all break-up of capitalism was a doctrinaire illusion, and that socialists should place their hopes in gradual social reforms and socialization as the result of democratic pressure". He also established close relations with English socialists, most notably the Fabian Society, whose leaders included George Bernard Shaw and Sidney and Beatrice Webb. While Bernstein later denied that Fabianism was the direct source of his new views, and even criticised their "visionless pragmatism", the Fabians' gradualist, empirical, and ethical approach to socialism undoubtedly reinforced the direction of his own thought. Many Fabians were zealous adherents of Darwinism, and this intellectual environment, imbued with evolutionary thought from figures like H. G. Wells and Ramsay MacDonald, likely made Bernstein more receptive to gradualist ideas.

== Evolutionary socialism ==
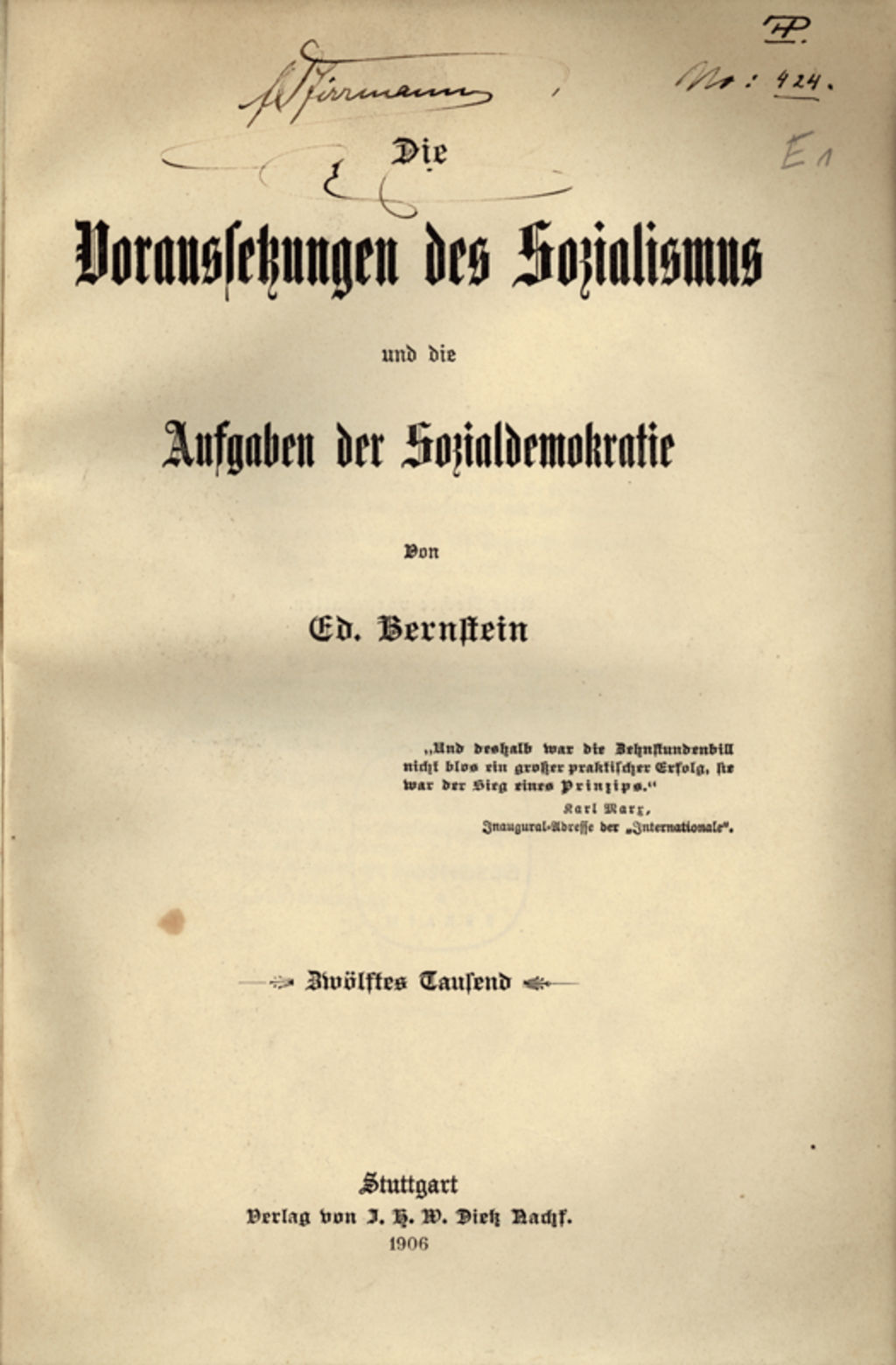
Title page of the 1906 edition of Die Voraussetzungen des Sozialismus und die Aufgaben der Sozialdemokratie (1899), also known as Evolutionary Socialism

Bernstein's evolutionary socialism, a form of revisionist Marxism, developed from a series of articles he wrote for the SPD's theoretical journal, Die Neue Zeit, between 1896 and 1898, under the title Probleme des Sozialismus ("Problems of Socialism"). These culminated in his landmark book, Die Voraussetzungen des Sozialismus und die Aufgaben der Sozialdemokratie (The Preconditions of Socialism and the Tasks of Social Democracy, 1899), which was translated into English as Evolutionary Socialism but incompletely or partly, by Edith C. Harvey in 1909, and complete translation has come as The Preconditions of Socialism, in 1993 by Henry Tudor. The book created an immediate storm of controversy within the international socialist movement. It provided a new conceptual scheme for socialists to comprehend contemporary developments and offered an alternative to the orthodox Marxist framework.

Bernstein's critique of Marxism was comprehensive, targeting its philosophy, economic predictions, and political strategy. His central argument was that the reality of late 19th-century capitalism had diverged significantly from Marx's forecasts. This "moulting", as he called it, required socialists to reconcile their theories with the facts.

=== Philosophy ===
Bernstein rejected the Hegelian dialectic that formed the philosophical core of Marxism, viewing it as a "snare" and a "treacherous element" that led to dogmatic and inaccurate predictions. He argued that the dialectical method, with its emphasis on contradiction and violent transformation, was a remnant of the "Blanquist element in Marxism", a radical Utopianism that had no place in a scientific socialist movement. He saw his critique as an attack on "all speculative systems which purport to explain history by a single abstract principle". Instead of dialectical materialism, he advocated for a return to the critical philosophy of Immanuel Kant and a greater emphasis on ethics.

Bernstein's embrace of evolution as the core principle of development was central to his rejection of the dialectic. He saw his own "evolutionary socialism" as the sociological equivalent of Darwinism, replacing the theory of catastrophic change with a model of gradual, organic development. He argued that the dialectic misled Marx and Engels into advocating revolutionary violence, and that their contributions were more in harmony with Herbert Spencer's evolutionary doctrines. While he continued to draw parallels between Marx and Darwin, he argued that Marx's "revolutionary evolutionism" was an unresolved contradiction; Bernstein's revisionism sought to resolve it by siding firmly with evolution against revolution.

For Bernstein, socialism was not a historical inevitability but an ethical ideal. It was something that ought to be, a goal to be striven for based on a commitment to justice and equality, rather than something that must be as a result of impersonal historical laws. As capitalism progressed, he argued, ideological and ethical factors would acquire "greater scope for independent activity" as individuals and nations freed themselves from the "elemental sway of economic forces". He famously declared in a response to his critics:

I confess openly, I have extraordinarily little interest or taste for what is generally called the 'final goal of Socialism.' This aim, whatever it be, is nothing to me, the movement everything.

This statement, often taken out of context, was not a rejection of socialist goals but an assertion of the primacy of the democratic and ethical process—the "movement"—over dogmatic adherence to a single, predetermined outcome.

=== Economics ===
Bernstein's economic revisionism was based on his observation that capitalism was not collapsing but adapting and stabilizing. He presented statistical evidence to refute several key Marxist predictions:

- Concentration of capital: While Marx predicted that capital would become concentrated in fewer and fewer hands, Bernstein argued that the number of property owners was in fact increasing in both relative and absolute terms, thanks to the rise of joint-stock companies and a more differentiated class structure. He showed that small and medium-sized enterprises were proving resilient, not disappearing as Marx had forecast. A key piece of evidence he used was data from the 1895 German occupational census, which appeared to show an increase in the number of middle-sized agrarian holdings.
- Collapse theory (Zusammenbruchstheorie): Bernstein rejected the idea that capitalism was doomed to collapse through increasingly severe economic crises. He argued that the development of the credit system, cartels, and an improved world market had given capitalism greater adaptability and flexibility, making general crises "less and less probable".
- Immiseration theory: The Marxist theory of the "growing misery" of the proletariat was, according to Bernstein, incorrect. He pointed to evidence that the working class in advanced industrial countries was experiencing an improvement in its standard of living. He also argued that the middle class was not vanishing but changing its character, with the rise of a "new middle class" of white-collar workers, technicians, and public officials.

=== Politics ===
From this revised analysis of capitalism, Bernstein drew radical conclusions for socialist political strategy. If capitalism was not on the verge of collapse, and if democracy was expanding, then the path to socialism was not revolution but gradual, peaceful, parliamentary reform. The important thing, he argued, was to recognize that the party was already "working towards the socialist transformation of society through democratic and economic reforms". He urged the SPD to "dare to appear what it is today: a democratic-Socialist reform party." Bernstein saw democracy as both the means and the end of socialism. He advocated for the expansion of political and economic rights through the existing state, championing trade unions and cooperatives as key "democratic elements in industry". He rejected the concept of the "dictatorship of the proletariat" as a "barbarian" and "atavistic" idea, arguing that socialism could only be achieved democratically.

He also rejected the applicability of the Darwinian struggle for existence to human society. He argued that the Malthusian logic of scarcity did not apply to humanity, which could increase its productivity without natural limits. He viewed the class struggle not as a necessary and desirable engine of history, as Marx did, but as an "unregulated driving force" akin to a natural law that socialists should aim to overcome through rational, conscious action. While he saw the necessity for the mass strike as a defensive weapon to protect democratic rights like the suffrage, he fundamentally believed in the power of gradual, "organic" evolution over violent upheaval. His environmentalist view of evolution led him to counter social Darwinists and racial theorists, arguing that improving the social environment through unions and democracy would create a "humane form of social selection" and lead to human progress, rendering the "brutal means of natural selection" obsolete.

=== International relations and war ===
Bernstein's later work increasingly focused on questions of international relations, militarism, and war. He advocated for a social democratic foreign policy based on international law, peace, and the self-determination of peoples. He argued that socialists must move beyond the "politics of states", which was driven by capitalist and imperialist interests, and embrace a "politics of peoples". This meant supporting democratic oversight of foreign policy, open diplomacy, free trade, and the creation of international institutions like a "league of peoples" to prevent war. He developed a distinct socialist theory of patriotism, contrasting the aggressive nationalism of imperialist states with a "civic" patriotism committed to democracy and republicanism. While a committed anti-imperialist, his views on colonialism were nuanced; he condemned its exploitative and oppressive aspects but also endorsed what he saw as its "civilizing mission" under certain democratic conditions, a position that drew criticism from the left wing of the party. At the 1907 Stuttgart Congress of the Second International, Bernstein led the majority of the German delegation in an effort to soften the party's traditional anti-colonial stance, arguing that "the congress does not reject colonial policy in principle and for all time, since it could operate as a civilizing factor under a socialist regime."

== Return to Germany and political career ==
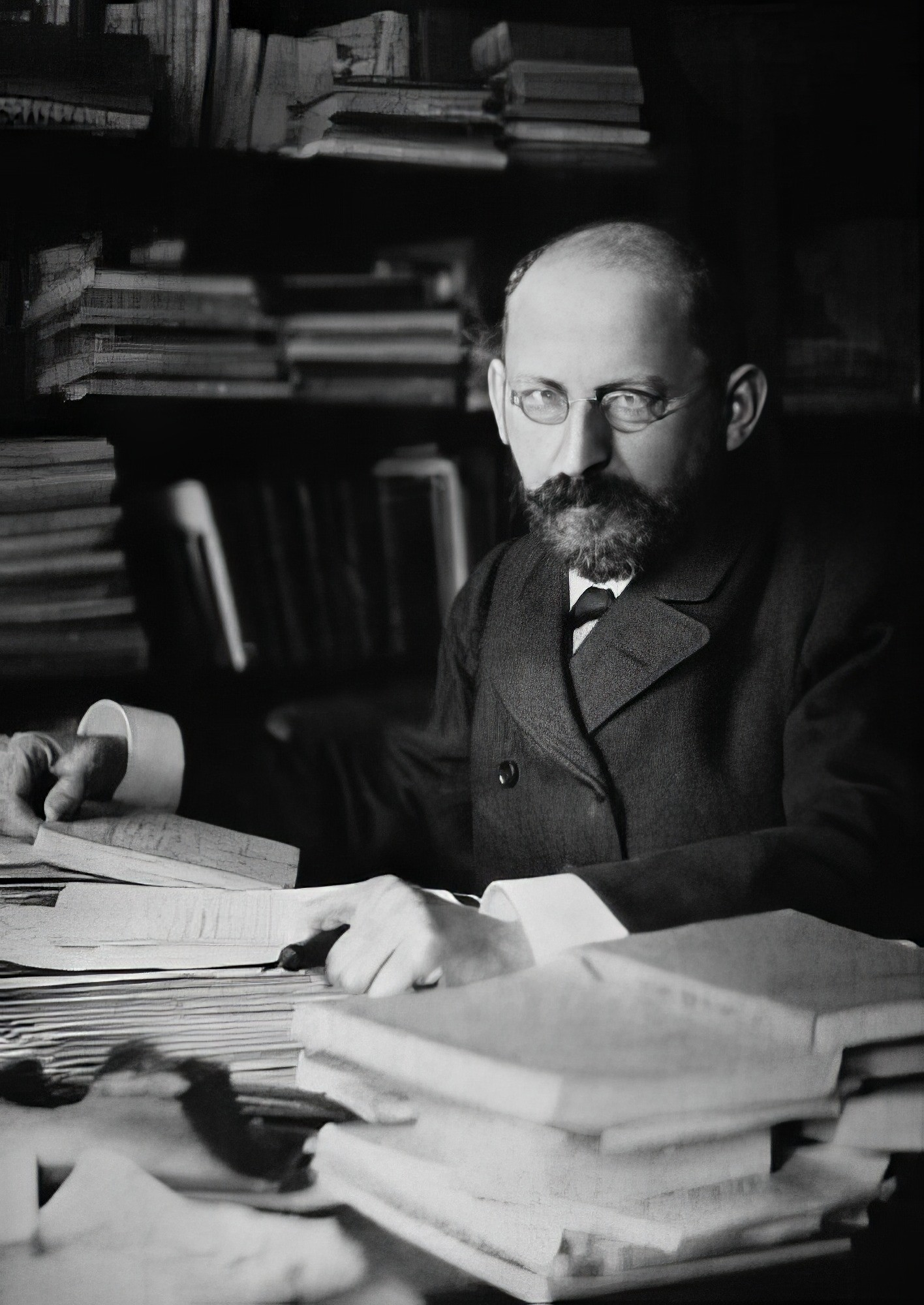
Bernstein in 1895

The intellectual stirrings that led to revisionism had begun in the SPD as early as the Frankfurt Congress of 1894, which saw a major debate on the "agrarian question". After the warrant for his arrest was allowed to lapse, Bernstein returned to Germany in February 1901. He was now the intellectual leader of a significant, if controversial, movement within the SPD. He was in heavy demand as a public speaker, and in 1902 he was elected to the Reichstag representing the constituency of Breslau-West, a seat he won with broad support from across the party. He served in the Reichstag for most of the next three decades (1902–1906, 1912–1918, and 1920–1928). In parliament, he specialized in issues of taxation, international trade, and constitutional law.

His return intensified the "Bernstein Debates" within the SPD. At successive party congresses, particularly at Hanover in 1899 and Dresden in 1903, his theories were the subject of heated discussion. The party leadership, dominated by Bebel and Kautsky, officially condemned revisionism and reaffirmed the revolutionary goals of the Erfurt Program. However, the SPD's day-to-day practice continued to be largely reformist, and Bernstein's views found wide, if often unacknowledged, support, especially among trade union leaders and the party's southern German branches. Bernstein himself remained a loyal, though critical, member of the party, continuing to argue for a policy of democratic reform and alliances with progressive elements of the bourgeoisie. After the SPD's defeat in the 1907 elections, which was partly attributed to the government's successful nationalist and colonialist appeal, Bernstein identified this appeal as a factor in the defeat, though he assigned it secondary importance. At the 1907 party congress in Essen, he advocated for an elaborate alliance system with the Progressives, the Centre Party, and the National Liberals to achieve franchise reform.

== World War I ==
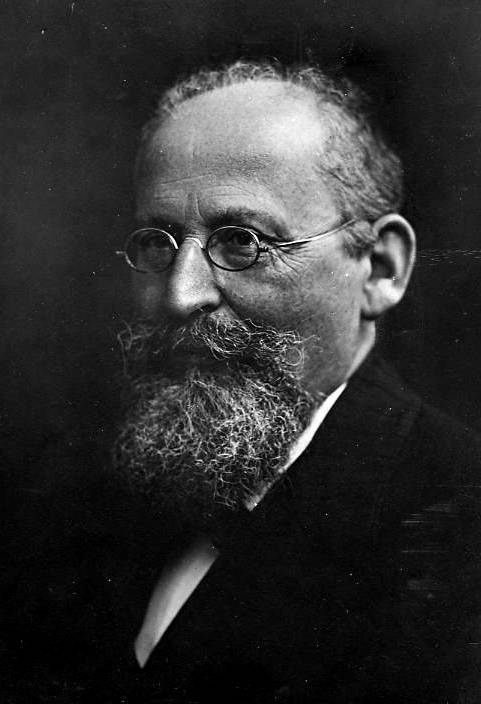
Bernstein, c. 1910s

The outbreak of World War I in 1914 confronted Bernstein and the SPD with their most severe test. Bernstein initially accepted the argument that Germany was fighting a defensive war against Tsarist Russia and, with a heavy heart and bound by party discipline, voted with the SPD majority to approve war credits on 4 August 1914. He had been deeply affected by the assassination of his friend, the French socialist leader Jean Jaurès, which he wrongly believed had been engineered by Russian agents.

However, as documentation of Germany's aggressive war aims came to light, particularly its violation of Belgian neutrality, Bernstein's position shifted dramatically. He later came to view his vote for war credits as the "darkest day" of his political life. His Anglophile sentiments and his deep commitment to internationalism and truth led him to become a vocal opponent of the war. He broke dramatically with his former revisionist allies on the SPD's right wing, who had become full-throated supporters of the German war effort. He began publishing articles denouncing German chauvinism and annexationist ambitions, which led to the termination of his long collaboration with the Sozialistische Monatshefte. He made great personal efforts to maintain international socialist ties, participating in anti-war conferences such as the 1915 Zimmerwald Conference.

On 20 March 1915, he was among a minority of SPD deputies who left the chamber rather than vote for further war credits. In June 1915, he, Kautsky, and Hugo Haase published a manifesto, "The Demand of the Hour", which condemned the war as an imperialist venture. The growing split within the SPD became permanent in March 1916, when Haase and his followers were expelled from the parliamentary party. Bernstein followed them, and in April 1917, he became a founding member of the anti-war Independent Social Democratic Party of Germany (USPD). At the USPD's founding congress in Gotha, Bernstein was part of a small right-wing faction, alongside Kautsky, that advocated for a "peace of understanding" and was wary of the more radical aims of the party's left wing.

== Weimar Republic and final years ==
During the German Revolution of 1918–1919, Bernstein served as an assistant secretary in the Treasury Department under the provisional government, the Council of the People's Deputies. He was one of the few USPD members to remain in his post after the coalition between the SPD and USPD collapsed in late December 1918. Bernstein's main political preoccupation during the revolution was the reunification of the German socialist movement. He argued that the split over the war was now obsolete and campaigned for a united front to build the new republic. In a symbolic gesture, he rejoined the SPD on 24 December 1918 while still a member of the USPD, becoming a "demonstrative one-man unity project". His efforts were initially unsuccessful, and he grew frustrated with the USPD's radical wing and its embrace of Bolshevism. During the Spartacist uprising in January 1919, he was working in the Treasury and narrowly escaped injury during intense fighting near his office. He formally left the USPD in March 1919 after it banned dual membership, publishing an open letter titled "Auf Wiedersehen!" ("Farewell!") to explain his departure.

Bernstein was one of the earliest historians of the German Revolution, providing a detailed social-democratic perspective on the events. In his book Die deutsche Revolution (1921; The German Revolution), he analysed the revolution's course and highlighted the dangers of both Bolshevik-style putsches and right-wing reaction. In another work, Wie eine Revolution zugrunde ging (1921; How a Revolution Perished), he drew parallels between the German Revolution and the French Revolution of 1848, a historical event that had greatly influenced his revisionist theories.

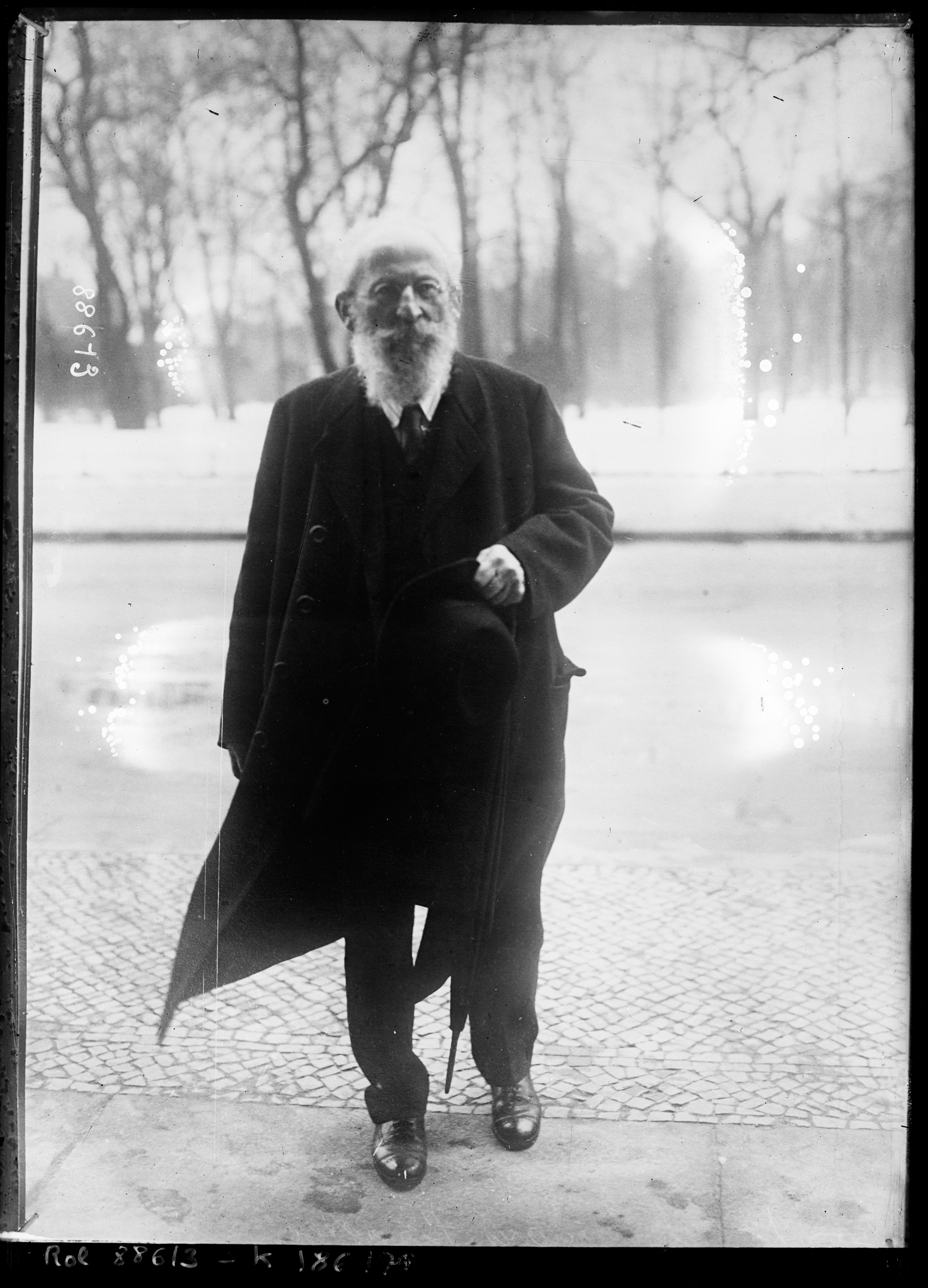
Bernstein in 1923

Throughout the Weimar Republic, Bernstein often spoke in favor of parliamentary democracy. At the 1919 SPD party congress, he argued against the widespread nationalist sentiment in his party, insisting on Germany's share of responsibility for the war and the necessity of accepting the Treaty of Versailles, despite its harshness. He also became a staunch opponent of Bolshevism, which he viewed as a "brutalized" and dictatorial "perversion" of Marxism, arguing that its methods were functionally indistinguishable from those of emerging fascism. He was instrumental in drafting the SPD's noticeably revisionist Görlitz Program of 1921, though this was largely replaced by the more orthodox Heidelberg Program in 1925, following the SPD's reunification with the remnants of the USPD.

As the Weimar Republic faltered, Bernstein found himself increasingly isolated. The party leadership was too preoccupied with its own version of Realpolitik to heed his warnings against the rising dangers of both right-wing reaction and communism. Upon his retirement from the Reichstag in 1928, he issued a manifesto with Kautsky urging the SPD to guard against "the deadly enemies of the republic", the alliance of great landowners, captains of industry, and the Communists.

Eduard Bernstein died in Berlin on 18 December 1932, at the age of 82. His funeral was the occasion for a mass demonstration against the rising Nazi Party. Adolf Hitler became Chancellor of Germany six weeks later.

== Legacy ==
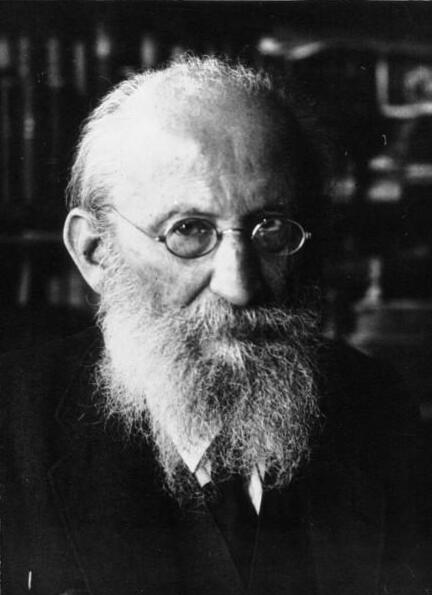
Bernstein in 1932

Bernstein is regarded as one of the founders of modern democratic socialism and a primary figure in the history of revisionism. According to historian Carl Schorske, he was a man of "unimpeachable intellectual integrity" who possessed the courage of "a conscientious objector in a militant society." His critique of orthodox Marxism forced the international socialist movement to confront the discrepancies between theory and reality at the turn of the 20th century. Although his ideas were officially rejected by the SPD, they reflected the party's actual reformist practice and provided a theoretical basis for social democratic parties throughout Europe in the 20th century. According to Leszek Kołakowski, revisionism created the "ideological foundation of a new social democracy... a compromise between liberalism and Marxian socialism" which was effectively a "socialist variant of liberalism". His work highlights the central "dilemma of democratic socialism": the tension between achieving radical social change and adhering to democratic, parliamentary means. He was unwavering in his conviction that socialism without democracy was a betrayal of its core principles.

Rosa Luxemburg argued that his approach sacrificed the revolutionary goal of socialism for the sake of bourgeois reform. Her pamphlet Social Reform or Revolution? analysed the revisionist controversy and resisted its implications for the SPD. Though Luxemburg shared a belief in the value of democracy and the necessity of reforms that ease the burden of the working class, she maintained socialist strategy should go beyond simply tempering capitalism's contradictions, instead advocating fundamental structural transformation.

Bernstein insisted that a gradual, ethical, and democratic evolution was the only path compatible with a humane society. The historian Peter Gay concludes that Bernstein's greatest contribution was his profound honesty and his courage to "submit Marxist dogma to searching examination while not surrendering the Socialist standpoint". By the time of the SPD's 1959 Godesberg Program, which formally renounced Marxism, Bernstein's legacy was so forgotten that only a few party intellectuals were aware of the intimate connection between his revisionism and the party's new direction.

== Selected works ==
- Ferdinand Lassalle als Sozialreformer (Ferdinand Lassalle as a Social Reformer). 1893.
- Kommunistische und demokratisch-sozialistische Strömungen während der englischen Revolution des 17. Jahrhunderts (Communist and Democratic-Socialist Currents during the English Revolution of the 17th Century). 1895. Later republished as Sozialismus und Demokratie in der großen englischen Revolution (Socialism and Democracy in the Great English Revolution). Also known as Cromwell and Communism.
- "Probleme des Sozialismus" ("Problems of Socialism"). Die Neue Zeit. 1896–1898.
  - "Das realistische und das ideologische Moment im Socialismus" ("The Realistic and the Ideological Moment in Socialism"). Die Neue Zeit. 1898.
  - "Der Kampf der Sozialdemokratie und die Revolution der Gesellschaft" ("The Struggle of Social Democracy and the Social Revolution"). Die Neue Zeit. 1898.
- Die Voraussetzungen des Sozialismus und die Aufgaben der Sozialdemokratie (The Preconditions of Socialism and the Tasks of Social Democracy). 1899. Also known as Evolutionary Socialism.
- "Der Sozialismus und die Kolonialfrage" ("Socialism and the Colonial Question"). Sozialistische Monatshefte. 1900.
- Zur Geschichte und Theorie des Sozialismus (On the History and Theory of Socialism). 1901.
- Wie ist wissenschaftlicher Sozialismus möglich? (How is Scientific Socialism Possible?). 1901.
- Der politische Massenstreik und die politische Lage der Sozialdemokratie in Deutschland (The Political Mass Strike and the Political Situation of Social Democracy in Germany). 1905.
- Die heutige Sozialdemokratie in Theorie und Praxis (Social Democracy Today in Theory and Practice). 1906.
- "Patriotismus, Militarismus und Sozialdemokratie" ("Patriotism, Militarism and Social Democracy"). Sozialistische Monatshefte. 1907.
- Die Geschichte der Berliner Arbeiterbewegung (The History of the Berlin Labour Movement). 1907–1910. Three volumes.
- Die Internationale der Arbeiterklasse und der europäische Krieg (The International of the Working Class and the European War). 1915.
- Aus den Jahren meines Exils (My Years of Exile: Reminiscences of a Socialist). 1918.
- Was ist Sozialismus? (What is Socialism?). 1919.
- Die deutsche Revolution von 1918/19: Geschichte der Entstehung und ersten Periode der deutschen Republik (The German Revolution of 1918–19: History of the Origin and First Period of the German Republic). 1921.
- Der Sozialismus einst und jetzt: Streitfragen des Sozialismus in Vergangenheit und Gegenwart (Socialism Then and Now: Controversial Questions of Socialism in the Past and Present). 1922.
- Entwicklungsgang eines Sozialisten (The Development of a Socialist). 1924.
