= La Marseillaise (disambiguation) =

La Marseillaise is the name of the national anthem of France.

La Marseillaise or Marseillaise may also refer to:

- La Marseillaise (film), a 1938 film about the early part of the French Revolution
- La Marseillaise, a daily newspaper published in Marseille
- La Marseillaise (1869 newspaper), a French weekly newspaper
- La Marseillaise (sculpture), a depiction of La Marseillaise on the Arc de Triomphe
- La Marseillaise (skyscraper), an office skyscraper in Marseille
- La Marseillaise des Blancs, a royalist and Catholic adaptation of the anthem
- La marseillaise de la Commune, a version of La Marseillaise that was created and used by the Paris Commune in 1871
- French cruiser Marseillaise, two cruisers of the French Navy
- "The Women's Marseillaise," a women's suffrage song set to the tune of La Marseillaise
- Worker's Marseillaise, a Russian revolutionary song set to the tune of the French anthem
