= Wilhelm Blos =

German politician (1849–1927)

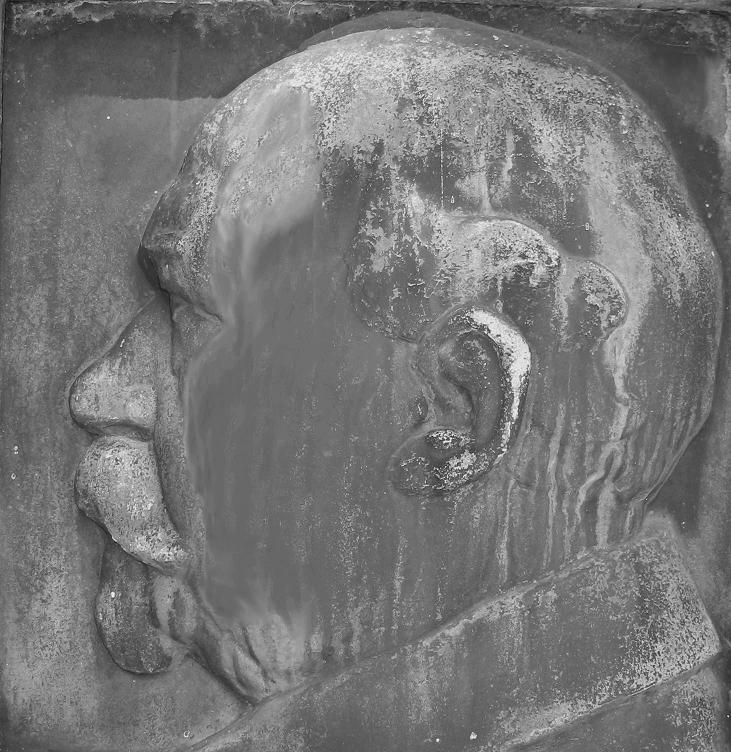
- Born: Wilhelm Josef Blos; 5 October 1849; Wertheim am Main, Baden, Germany
- Died: 6 July 1927 (aged 77); Bad Cannstatt (Stuttgart), Württemberg, Germany
- Occupations: Journalist; Historian; Author; Politician
- Political party: SDAP; SPD
- Spouse: Anna Tomasczewska (m. 1905)
- Children: 1
- Parents: Aloys Blos (father); Maria Josepha Döhner (mother)

Wilhelm Josef Blos (5 October 1849 – 6 July 1927) was a German journalist, historian, novelist, dramatist and politician (SPD). He served as a member of the imperial parliament (Reichstag) between 1877 and 1918, albeit with one three year break. After the end of World War I he served between 1918 and 1920 as the first president of the newly launched Free People's State of Württemberg.

One high-point of his career as a journalist was his one-year stint as editor-in-chief of the (initially) Hamburg-based popular left-wing satirical magazine Der Wahre Jacob between 1879 and the publication's (temporary) closure, triggered by expulsion of William Blos from Hamburg in October 1880. His own contributions appeared under the pseudonyms "Hans Flux" or – on at least one occasion – "A. Titus".

== Life ==
=== Provenance and early years ===
Wilhelm Joseph Blos was born at Wertheim am Main during the aftermath of the 1848 uprisings, the son of a physician who had moved away from the big city on account of his delicate health. Aloys Blos died from an incurable lung disease in 1856, when his son Wilhelm was just seven years old. His children's mother almost immediately remarried, selecting on this occasion a forester. Wilhelm and his sister acquired a step-father who abused Wilhelm. In 1863 he went to live with his grandparents. His grandfather died almost at once, but his grandmother attended to his education. He became a pupil at the (subsequently renamed and rebuilt) Lyceum (secondary school) in Wertheim, his hometown, located slightly above 100 km to the north of Stuttgart. Wilhelm Blos would later sue his step-father successfully for stealing his inheritance. Meanwhile, he embarked on a commercial apprenticeship in Mannheim, but broke it off uncompleted in order to study for and pass his Abitur (school graduation exam) which in 1868 opened the way for him to enrol at the University of Freiburg to study History and Philology. At university he also joined the Corps Rhenania (student fraternity).

=== Journalist: satire and socialism ===
After just three terms Blos was obliged by lack of funds to abandon his university career. He turned to journalism. Between 1870 and 1875 he led a somewhat itinerant career, working for a succession of Social Democratic publications. After a brief period contributing to the "Konstanzer Volksfreund" he was on the receiving end of an indictment under the press laws. Meanwhile, in 1872, in Nuremberg, he became a member of the recently launched Social Democratic Workers' Party (SDAP), which is widely seen as the precursor of the SPD. After that he got to know August Bebel and Wilhelm Liebknecht at Eisenach. After Bebel, Liebknecht and Adolf Hepner were all arrested and subjected to a show trial, it fell to Blos to take charge of the editorship of the Leipzig-based Der Volksstaat (newspaper). However Hepner was found to be "as innocent as a new-born child" – in the words not of the court but, much later, of August Bebel – and released (while his two co-accused each received a two-year jail term). In 1874, still working at Volksstaat. it was Blos who was arrested and sentenced to a three-month jail term for "press offences". Following his release, still in 1874, Blos met Karl Marx, who was visiting Leipzig with his daughter on the way home from a cure at Karlsbad.

=== More journalism: more politics ===
In 1875 Blos founded his own magazine, the weekly satirical "Mainzer Eulenspiegel". However, it was apparently in connection with this publication that he was very soon indicted and locked up. His incarceration appears to have been brief, but "Mainzer Eulenspiegel" seems not to have survived. In May 1875 he attended the Gotha Unification Congress which gave birth to the Social Democratic Party (SDAP / SPD). He participated as the delegate representing no fewer than 125 party members from Mainz and Gartenfeld. In the national parliamentary elections of 1877 and 1881 (but not 1878) he won the electoral district of "Reuss Elder Line" for the SDAP / SPD.

=== Expulsion ===
In Fall/Autumn 1875, Blos started work at the Hamburg-Altonaer Volksblatt, a socialist daily paper newly launched by the politician-journalist Wilhelm Hasenclever. He stayed with the newspaper as a contributing editor – initially alongside the worker-poet Jacob Audorf – till 1880. He was also working between 1878 and 1881, alongside Ignaz Auer at the short-lived "Gerichtszeitung" (loosely, "Court Reporter" newspaper). The so-called "Socialist Laws" of 1878 put an end to many socialist and social democratic newspapers and magazines, though as matters turned out the effectiveness of press censorship was very variable in the different regions of the newly "united" Germany. Hamburg and the adjacent (but at that time determinedly separate) more proletarian municipality of Altona were both robustly opposed to the centralising tendencies of the emerging German nation-state, and both had powerful traditions of political liberalism and radicalism of their own. That rise to hopes that the de facto censorship of socialist media. In 1879 to the support of the politically committed publisher Johann Heinrich Wilhelm Dietz, Wilhelm Blos found himself installed as the first editor-in-chief of Der Wahre Jacob, a socialist satirical magazine published monthly between November 1879 and October 1880. Publication ended in October 1880 when Blos – along with Dietz and Audorf – was among the approximately 75 social-democrat activists deprived of residency entitlement in Hamburg and Prussia by "government authorities". He was given 48 hours to leave what had by this time become his home city.

=== Württemberg ===
Blos found refuge initially in Mainz, and subsequently in Bremen. In 1883 he was invited by his old comrade Dietz to team up together in Stuttgart, where Dietz had re-established his publishing operation in December 1881. It turned out that the persecution to which Social Democrats were prey across the German empire during the twelve years of the "Socialist Laws" was very much less intense in the Württembergisch capital than it had been in Hamburg. Berlin and Prussia felt far away: for the eventful final four and a half decades of his life, the Stuttgart region became home for Wilhelm Blos. At Stuttgart he took work as a proof reader on Die Neue Zeit, Dietz's (at that time) monthly socialist theoretical journal of the SPD. Its headquarters was in Stuttgart, Germany. It was only in 1884 that he began, cautiously and "semi-officially", submitting his own contributions under the section heading "Politische Rundschau", and identified only by his initials as W.B.

=== Parliamentarian ===
Despite the laws against socialist press and party organisations, the SAPD / SDP retained a small but unignorable presence in the Reichstag during the 1880s. There are, indeed, indications that support for social democratic policies in the industrial heartlands may actually have been boosted through the 1880s by Bismarck's "Socialist Laws". When the Steamboat subsidy dispute blew up in the imperial parliament (Reichstag), Blos came out as a strong supporter of the new laws. The party was deeply divided, since the subject of a government backed international mail-boat network was clearly enmeshed in wider discussion of whether and how far Germany should be seeking to emulate the global imperialism of France and Britain. In backing the Steamboat subsidy Law, Blos presented himself as an unapologetic internationalist. As early as 1881, in addressing the parliament, he asserted, "they say that within the Social Democrats there are two parties, as you might say one that is moderate and another that is extremist or revolutionary. I want to make a different distinction. There are two parties, one global and the other parochial: that is how the thing will develop" (Note: „... daß unter uns sozusagen zwei Parteien bestehen, eine gemäßigte und eine extreme oder revolutionäre, wie er sie genannt hat. Ich möchte diese Eintheilung etwas anders machen. Es sind vielmehr die zwei Parteien eine ausländische und eine einheimische; so wird die Sache wohl liegen.“) In 1887 a conservative commentator wrote that "... Messrs Geiser, Blos and Frohme, whose political output mostly appears in the Dietz Press, have the same interests ... The application over many years of their moderate journalism is naturally not without influence on the wider thinking [among social democrats].

=== Politics and journalism under the ban ===
In 1884 Dietz and Blos revived "Der wahre Jacob". Production of the satirical magazine now continued in Stuttgart without further interruption till 1914. Wilhelm Blos contributed frequently under his pseudonym "Hans Flux", though the job of editor-in-chief now passed to others. During the second half of the 1880s, parliamentary duties combined with other journalistic responsibilities to detain him in Berlin. He served as editor-in-chief at the Berliner Volksblatt between 1884 and 1890. Many Social-Democratic publications were banned under the "Socialist Laws" during this period: a fine line was pursued under the editorial leadership of Wilhelm Blos whereby the "Berliner Volksblatt" narrowly avoided that fate. After 1890 the newspaper was relaunched and in 1891 rebranded as "Vorwärts". Blos stayed on briefly as co-editor-in-chief, sharing duties with Wilhelm Liebknecht.

The 1884 general election was unusual in that three candidates were elected for more than one electoral districts: of whom two had stood successfully as SDAP / SPD) candidates. One was Wilhelm Hasenclever: Wilhelm Blos was the other. Elected by voters in both "Reuss Elder Line" and Braunschweig central, and required to choose, he chose a move to Braunschweig, forcing a bye-election in Reuss a few weeks later. Apart from a three year break between 1887 and 1890, He continued to represent Braunschweig in the imperial parliament (Reichstag) till 1918. Despite having been the youngest member of parliament when first elected, back in 1877, Wilhelm Blos never became a stellar parliamentary performer. He n3vertheless delivered several notable speeches over the years, especially with regard to worker protection. He was, in addition, known as an advocate for a parliamentary alliance between the SPD and the Liberals, and as a supporter of political and social reform.

=== Chronicler of a liberal dawn? ===
1890 was a year of political change: two linked developments, in particular, were important for the future of Social Democracy in Germany In January 1890 parliament, since 1887 dominated by liberals and centrists, refused to renew the "Socialist Laws" which, accordingly, lapsed. In March 1890 Chancellor Bismarck finally resigned, with a show of reluctance that may very well have been unfeigned. Blos turned increasingly to historical research and other projects of penmanship. His publications from this period include two "socially critical" novels, translations and works of the revolutions of 1848/49. There were also various autobiographical contributions with a strong political slant. Horst Krause shares his verdict: "His writing of history certainly did not reveal him a great scholar of the subject ... but it was enough to demonstrate basic historical competence when it came to identifying the key personalities in the Social Democratic movement, both among his party colleagues and more widely, and by connecting with a broad readership ... he did contribute significantly to the shaping of contemporary political perspectives". (Note: "Seine Geschichtsschreibung wies ihn zwar nicht als großen Wissenschaftler aus […], daß ihm in historischen Fragen von bedeutenden Persönlichkeiten seiner Partei und über die Parteigrenzen hinaus nicht nur Kompetenz attestiert worden ist, sondern daß er ein breites Publikum gefunden und […] das politische Bewußtsein seiner Zeitgenossen mitgeprägt hat".)

=== Anna ===
In 1905 Wilhelm Blos, by now in his mid-50s, married Anna Berta Antonia Blos Tomasczewska (1866-1933), the daughter of a military physician from Lower Silesia. Her conservative upbringing made her, on the face of things, an effective Württemberg politician. By 1905 she had become a respected figure in the Social Democratic Party and a prominent leader in the increasingly mainstream (at least on the political left) "votes for women" campaign. The marriage was followed by the birth of the couple's son.

=== War ===
The outbreak of war in 1914 again threatened to split the Social Democratic Party. The focus of disagreement was over whether the party should give its parliamentary votes to supporting the war, and in particular whether to vote for funding of the war. Party leaders prepared to support the war were motivated both by traditional patriotism and by the widely shared terror of the military build-up in the Russian Empire which, if left unchecked for another couple of years, would free up the Tsar to impose on Germany the brutal autocracy under which many millions already suffered. The SPD leadership in the Reichstag, after much agonising, determined on a so-called "Burgfriedenspolitik", which meant refraining from criticism of the government's war and voting for war funding in the parliament. It was also determined that the trades unions, taking their cue from the SPD leadership, should refrain from striking for the duration of the war. Wilhelm Blos came out in support of the leadership's backing for the war. In return, there was an understanding in some quarters, that when it was over Germany's ruling establishment would back SPD demands for a more democratic voting system in place of the infamous "Dreiklassenwahlrecht" which was designed to privilege voters with large amounts of land and money. The "Burgfriedenspolitik" did indeed provide support for the war across the political spectrum, but it also led, in combination with intensifying political austerity and the slaughter of war, to a permanent split of the Social Democratic Party – and thereby of the political left in Germany – which would be highly destructive in its impact. "Der wahre Jacob", of which he had been founding editor, and to which he still contributed, followed the same line: mockery of "der wahre Jacob" – hitherto seen as a satirical and thoroughly disrespectful soubriquet targeting the emperor – disappeared from its pages, to be replaced by nationalist backing for the "Burgfriedenspolitik".

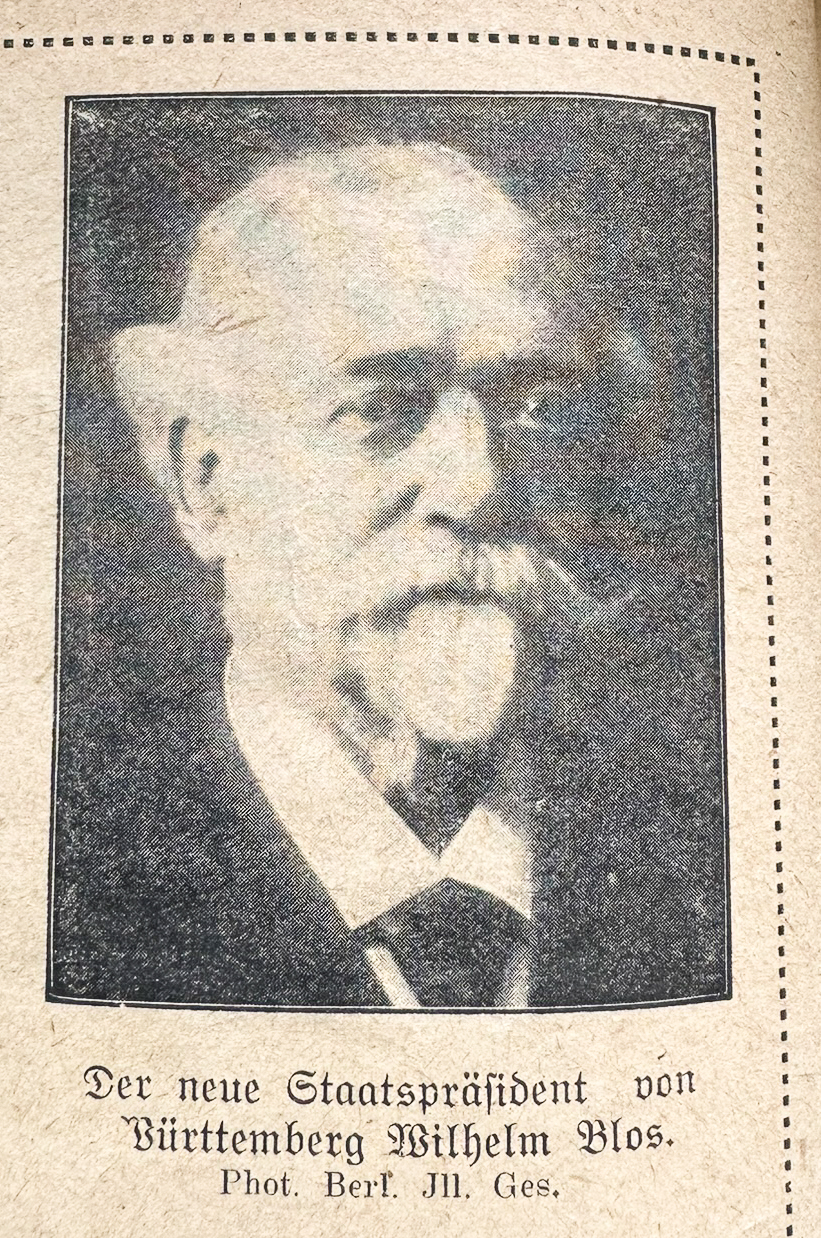
Former President of the Free People's State of Württemberg

=== Revolution ===
Following the outbreak of the post-war revolution, on 9 November 1918 Wilhelm Blos was installed "by the revolution" as minister-president of what became, shortly afterwards, the Free People's State of Württemberg. (Note: 9 November was also the day on which the Kaiser's abdication was announced in Berlin, but it is not clear whether this internationally important information registered in Stuttgart till the next day.) Change was in the air, and despite the Württembergers' much vaunted preference for political stability and their king's unfashionably easy relationship with "his people", November 1918 would be marked by not just by the Kaiser's abdication, far to the east in Berlin, but also by the abdication, closer to home, of the king of Württemberg. By this time Blos was 69, and had retired from active politics in order (he said) to concentrate on journalism. It is apparent that he had never aspired to lead the government. His intention on 9 November 1918 was simply to accompany his (much younger) politician-wife to a meeting of the Württemberg SPD party executive committee. When the meeting grew boring and he found there was nothing for him to do, Blos returned home, but after lunch his wife appeared and asked him to return with her to the "Landtagsgebäude" ("parliament building"), where the parliamentarians were keen to ask his advice. Their walk to the parliament building took them past the royal palace where the king could be seen on the steps, and there were groups of people excitedly talking together in the forecourt. Others, it turned out, had already entered the palace and requested the king, respectfully through the good offices of one of his servants, that the royal flag should be lowered and a red flag raised in its place. The king had refused the request, and one soldier had been beaten up when attempting to enforce his refusal. Nevertheless, by the time Blos walked past with his wife a red flag fluttered from the royal palace. Although the bloodied soldier in question was the only person to shed any blood over the affair, by the standards of the Württembergers the revolution was in full swing.

Meeting in the large (but still badly overcrowded) committee room at the parliament building he found local leadership representatives from both Social Democratic Parties, trades unions and the local Soldiers' Soviet. In his own record of what happened next, included in a book three years later, Wilhelm Blos indicates that it was only with reluctance, and after some delay, that he shared his insights with the meeting. He reminded his listeners that events had landed them, as representatives of the people, with political power. The red flag flew over the royal palace and the revolution had triumphed completely. Drawing on repeated lessons from history, he urged them to hold on to that power securely, because others would otherwise seize it, and their intentions were unlikely to be benign. A provisional government must be formed without delay. Wilhelm Blos was no great orator, but evidently his words resonated with his nervous audience. A local parliamentarian called Wilhelm Keil proposed Blos as chairman of the provisional government of the Free People's State of Württemberg: the proposal was accepted without further debate.

Thanks to the length of his parallel careers in journalism and politics, Wilhelm Blos was very much a "known quantity" for many of those who selected him to head up the Württemberg provisional government. The choice was also a reflection of his political moderation. Even within the Soldiers' Soviet, most of the foot-soldiers of the "German revolution" were not longstanding "Bolsheviks" as their frightened enemies might suppose, but simply hungry and desperate ex-soldiers, home from a war that had been disastrously lost, who found themselves without prospects and without jobs. Blos was a figure around whom both "radical democrats" and many "bourgeois traditionalists" might hope to find common ground. The provisional government formed on 9 November 1918 comprised at this stage both "Independent" Social Democrats and "mainstream" Social Democrats. Two days later, on 11 November 1918, the "Blos provisional government" was joined by ministers from two of the more "centrist" and left-leaning "bourgeois parties".

During the evening of 9 November 1918, King William II of Württemberg was escorted by a delegation of revolutionary workers to the safety of his relatively remote hunting lodge at the former Abbey of Bebenhausen. The next day there were no protests from any of the "bourgeois traditionalist" members of the previous (i.e. pre-revolutionary) government over the king's decision to release them from their oaths of office by telephone. King William's formal abdication was enshrined in a brief and affectionate address delivered to the people in the "Staatsanzeiger" (newspaper) on 30 November 1918. The affection was evidently genuine and mutual. In the words of the "Schwäbisches Tagblatt" (newspaper) "the revolutionary movement had been in no sense directed against the person of the king, but against the monarchical system, which had been made bankrupt under [Emperor] Wilhelm II of Hohenzollern". A couple of days after the abdication, agreement was reached with the provisional government under the terms of which the former king would receive a relatively generous annual pension of 200,000 marks. When workers had entered the royal palace on the day of the revolution they had found no stocks of food or weaponry. The king and his household had been adhering rigidly to the same restricted food ration as everyone else. Perhaps this was one reason why all the ministers in the provisional government led by Blos, including even those who were members of the leftist Independent Social Democratic Party of Germany, voted unanimously in favour of the king's pension.

On 12 January 1919 an election took place for a new Constitutional Assembly, mandated to agree a new republican constitution for the Free People's State of Württemberg. The election result had the effect of confirming Wilhelm Blos in office, leading a provisional government with an increased majority in the assembly: the overall complexion of the new government became more overtly centrist, following the resignation from it of the two remaining Independent Social Democratic Party members two days before the election. One of the first acts of the Constitutional Assembly, on 29 January 1919, was to confirm the (no longer provisional) government in office. Five weeks later, in recognition that Württemberg no longer had a king at the apex of the political hierarchy, Wilhelm Blos lost his title of "minister-president", becoming instead "Staatspräsident" (loosely, "state president"). It was an indication of the extent of his support in the Constitutional Assembly that the change was backed with the votes of 100 out of the 129 assembly members. That level of consensus is consistent with agreement on the new republican constitution proving relatively easy to achieve. A new constitution for Württemberg was formally adopted by the assembly on 23 May 1919: it came into force on 25 September 1919, ten days ahead of Wilhelm Blos' seventieth birthday.

The first regular elections to the parliament of the Free People's State of Württemberg, timed to coincide with the 1920 general election for the national parliament of the German republic, were held on 6 June 1920. The SPD suffered major losses, with its vote share declining to just over 16%, allowing it 17 seats in the 101 seat assembly. The SPD's election performance was similarly dire in other parts of Germany and indeed in that year's national election, in which their vote share slumped to 21.9% and they lost a third of their seats in the Reichstag. In Württemberg the Blos government resigned. Wilhelm Blos was replaced as "Staatspräsident" by the "Democratic-Liberal", Johannes von Hieber, who would, on taking office, pay generous tribute to the "calm and dignity, combined with clever prudence, wisdom and decisiveness" that his predecessor had displayed as leader of the government. More tributes along the same lines appeared in the Württemberg press.

=== Final years ===
His incumbency as "Staatspräsident" ended a couple of weeks after the election, on 23 June 1920. He continued to sit as a member of the parliament till 1924. Blos and his wife had lived in a "service apartment" in Stuttgart's "Old Castle" while he was head of government: following Wilhelm's resignation from office they were permitted to remain. Wilhelm Blos led his final years under circumstances of financial difficulty, however. One source describes his government pension as "kleinliche" (loosely, "... small change"). Much of his writing – though not all of it – from this final period in his life involved lucid expositions of his political career from his own perspective.

In April 1927 Wilhelm Blos suffered a serious stroke, from which he never recovered. During the final months of his life he was cared for by his wife at the home which they shared. Wilhelm Blos died on 6 July 1927 at the municipal hospital of Bad Cannstatt (Stuttgart).

== Celebration (selection) ==
- Two years after his death, as tributes and expressions of sorrow at his passing continued to appear, the government of Württemberg commissioned a large memorial to Wilhelm Blos, created by Alfred Lörcher, to be erected in Stuttgart's Pragfriedhof (cemetery) at public expense.
- Together with his wife, Blos has given his name to the "Blosweg" and "Blostwiete", two residential streets in Hamburg-Horn.
- Other cities and towns with streets named after Wilhelm Blos include Stuttgart and nearby Ludwigsburg, Wertheim, Heilbronn and Berlin-Mahlsdorf.
