= Jacob Audorf =

German journalist and author (1835–1898)

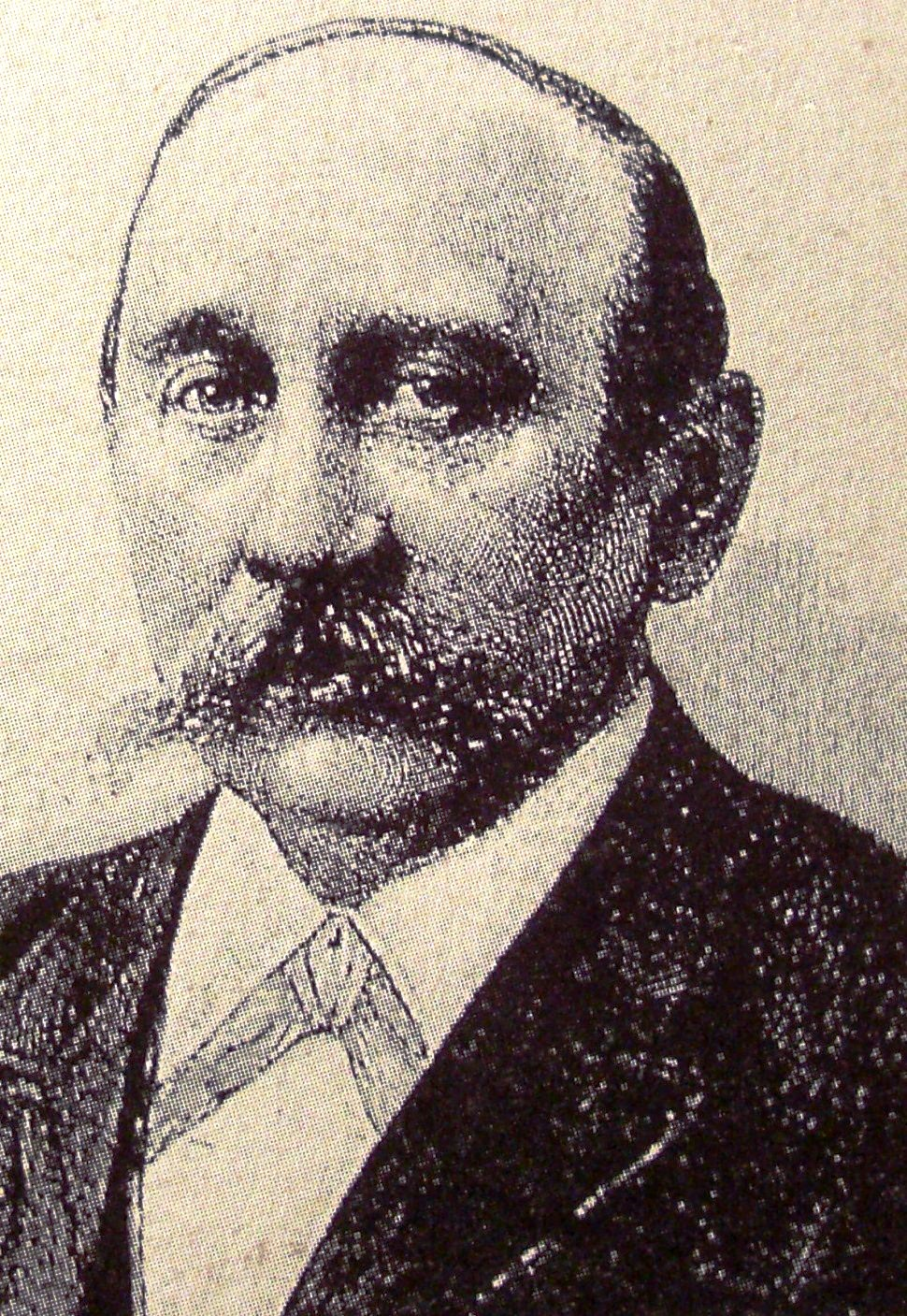
- 1898
- Born: Jacob Friedrich Theodor Audorf; 1 August 1835; Hamburg, German confederation
- Died: 20 June 1898 (aged 62); Hamburg, Germany
- Occupations: Businessman; Poet; Socialist activist Journalist-commentator; Labour movement pioneer
- Known for: the words to the so-called "German Workers' Marseillaise"
- Spouse: Anastasia Djakow
- Parents: Johann Hinrich Jakob Audorf (1807–91) (father); Margaretha Wülfken (1808–50) (mother)

Jacob Audorf (1 August 1835 – 20 June 1898) was a German poet, businessman, journalist-commentator and Labour movement pioneer. Much of his poetry was not remotely political, but it was for his political and polemical writing that he became known. The most frequently repeated of his poems was the so-called "German Workers' Marseillaise", a set of three verses (separated by a recurring refrain) of uplifting German-language encouragement for the building of a better future according to the socialist precepts of the time. The words were to be sung, in place of the French language original text, using Rouget de Lisle's already well known revolutionary melody for the Marseillaise.

== Life ==
=== Provenance and early years ===
Jacob Friedrich Theodor Audorf was born in Hamburg, still at that time a resolutely independent and economically formidable city-state near the German northern coast, and one of the 39 member states of the German Confederation. Johann Hinrich Jakob Audorf (1807–1891), his father, was a weaver of head scarves by trade, and a prominent Hamburg radical leader and organiser before and during 1848/49. The younger Jacob Audorf attended a charity school and then, between 1852 and 1857, undertook an apprenticeship as an artisan metal worker and mechanical engineer. Under the influence of his father, still a committed socialist, he joined the Hamburg Workers' Education Association while still an apprentice. In 1857, with his training completed and three thalers in his pocket, Audorf set out from Hamburg to discover the rest of Germany. In the end he spent five years as a wandering journeyman, travelling well beyond the confines of Germany.

=== Dawning of socialism ===
By the end of 1858 he had reached Switzerland, where during 1858-1859 he served as president of the Winterthur section of the "Allgemeiner Deutscher Arbeiter-Verein (ADAV)". A highlight of Audorf's time in Winterthur came in November 1859 when he attended the Schiller Festival in Zürich as ADAV delegate from Winterthur. The Schiller festivals held at that time in a number of German speaking cities marked both the centenary of the poet's birth and the ten year anniversary of the suppression of the 1848/49 revolutions. The celebrations were as much political and literary in character, and signalled a hope that the repressive decade that had run from 1849 till 1859 was, at least in some respects, being replaced by the gradual return a slightly more politically enlightened phase. (In Switzerland there was already, perhaps, a little more to celebrate in terms of political progress towards nationalist and liberal aspirations than in other parts of German speaking Europe.) It was probably in 1861 that Audorf moved on, first to (bilingual) Mulhouse and then, by the end of the year, Paris. During this period he mastered the French language so well that ten years later he was still able to earn extra money by translating popular French novels into German for serialisation in the literary "feuilleton" sections of middle-class German newspapers. The events of 1848/49 had driven a number of German radicals into political exile, and there are indications that in Paris - at least among German expatriates - Audorf continued to be politically active in pursuit of workers' rights, and in support of the liberal-social agenda of those times more broadly. By 1862 he was based in London where a number of high-profile German political exiles, Karl Marx, had also taken refuge. In November 1862 or early in 1863, as the political temperature in much of Germany continued to decline, Jacob Audorf returned to Hamburg. In 1863 he came under the influence of Ferdinand Lassalle, the man widely credited with having transformed social democracy from a set of philosophical aspirations to the basis for Germany's "first socialist party". Audorf became a leading figure, initially in Hamburg, in creating and developing the "Allgemeiner Deutscher Arbeiter-Verein" (ADAV), as it was initially known. On 28 March 1863 a workers' assembly in Hamburg, which would be second in size only to Berlin in Germany after 1871) formally endorsed Lassalle's manifesto document, his "Offnes Antwortschreiben" ("Published written answer"), ensuring that the ADAV, launched two months later, would be a pan-German organisation, firmly rooted not just in Berlin but also in and around the more commercially economically dynamic western provinces of Prussia.

=== General German Workers' Association ===
Two months later, on 23 May 1863, Audorf participated at the founding congress of the ADAV in Leipzig. He was elected to membership of the party executive, serving as a member of it between 1863 and 1868. He was, in addition, appointed ADAV senior representative, with appropriate contractual authority, for the Free State of Hamburg. He participated at the ADAV national congresses in 1864, 1866 and 1867, emerging as an uncompromising supporter of the movement's leader Ferdinand Lassalle, always committed to backing a clear policy programme, when confronted by recurring pressures for fragmentation from comrades with divergent visions. As one commentator put it, pressures for organisational democracy from within the ADAV had to learn to co-operate with its "social movement". After Lassalle died in August 1864, Audorf was similarly prompt unswerving in his demonstrations of loyalty to Bernhard Becker, the new ADAV leader (whose tenure was nevertheless brief).

It was during the middle 1860s that Audorf emerged as the political poet of socialism, whereby his published work became one of the most effective communication channels for the ADAV. His 1864 lyric for the "Workers' Marseillaise" ("Wohlan, wer Recht und Wahrheit achtet, zu unsrer Fahne steh allzuhauf!") became, and till beyond the end of the nineteenth century remained, the most widely known and performed song of the German labour movement.

=== Russia ===
In 1868, letting it be known that he had grown tired of the internal squabbling among comrades within the ADAV, Audorf relocated to Russia where he supported himself as a businessman. He returned to Germany and to German politics at the invitation of party comrades in Hamburg, and only after the six day Gotha "Unification Congress" of May 1875, at which a relaunch and rebranding of what was now the German Socialist Workers' Party held out something that could be interpreted as the prospect of a less fractious and more focused political face for the German labour movement. Between 1875 and 1877 he was a member of the editorial team, alongside Wilhelm Blos, at the newly launched "Hamburg-Altonaer Volksblatt" (socialist newspaper).

Nevertheless, the overall architecture of the party into which the ADAV had effectively been subsumed in 1875 no longer felt like his political home. His the so-called "German Workers' Marseillaise" continued to ring out at party gatherings, but Audorf himself was no longer a party insider. In approximately 1877 he returned to Russia and re-engaged with his commercial activities. In or shortly before 1881 he returned to Hamburg, but left for Russia again almost at once in order to escape the repressive impact of Bismarck's "Anti-Socialist Laws", which would in the short term marginalise political socialism and effectively defer the further development of the Social Democratic Party for more than a decade even if, by stimulating resentment against the increasingly irascible and out of touch Bismarck régime, there is a case to be made that that same series of laws did much to stimulate and hasten the Social Democrat's progress towards the political mainstream during the two decades following Audorf's death. By this time Audorf had acquired a detailed knowledge of the Russian language and business culture. During much of the 1880s he travelled across Asia as an agent working on behalf of a German-owned and managed manufacturing company based in Łódź. (Note: Łódź was part of Congress Poland between 1815 and 1915. Despite its initially semi-detached status in relation to the rest of Russia, the territory was widely seen in Germany (and the rest of western Europe) as just another part of the Russian Empire by the time of Audorf's involvement with the region.) Audorf remained in Russia till 1887. While in Russia Jacob Audorf teamed up with Anastasia Djakow, the daughter of a Russian landowner. They married in Hamburg on 30 April 1887.

=== Final Hamburg years ===
Although the "Anti-Socialist Laws" lapsed only in 1890, after 1871, there was little appetite in Berlin for Germany to mutate into a centralised state on the Anglo-French model, at least until after 1933. In reality, throughout the 1880s social democratic politics were outlawed with far less fervour in some part of Germany than in others. In April 1888 Audorf accepted an editorial position with the recently relaunched and rebranded Hamburger Echo (newspaper). The Echo, remained faithful to the social-democratic political traditions of Hamburg that long predated the Unification of Germany. Audorf remained an active member of the editorial team for the rest of his life, regularly contributing humorous and satirical pieces to the weekend issues.

During final years Aubert fell ill: he was nursed with devotion by his wife Anastasia. Though she never bothered to learn how to speak German, towards the end she intervened forcefully to prevent her husband from wearing himself out by spending too much time over his contributions to the "Echo".

== Celebration (selection) ==
On 5 September 1960 the "Audorfring" (residential street) in Hamburg-Horn was named in honour of Jacob Audorf.

The Audorfgasse in Vienna-Floridsdorf was named in honour of Jacob Audorf in 1992.
