= Volksstaat =

Volksstaat or Volkstaat may refer to:

- Volksstaat, a German word meaning "people's state" or "republic" that may refer to the following:
  - Volksstaat Hessen (People's State of Hesse), official name of Hesse from 1918 until the end of World War II
  - Freier Volksstaat Württemberg (Free People's State of Württemberg), German state of the Weimar Republic
  - Volksstaat Bayern, name given to Bavaria for short period of 1919
  - Volksstaat Reuß, name given to a part of Thuringia before its integration into the new land of Thuringia in 1920
  - Der Volksstaat, a newspaper of the Social Democratic Workers Party in Germany in the late 19th century
- Volkstaat, a proposed Afrikaner state in South Africa

== See also ==
- People's republic
- Nation state
