= Worker's Marseillaise =

Former national anthem of Russia

Rabóchaya Marselyéza
English: Worker's Marseillaise
- Рабочая Марсельеза
- Former national anthem of the Russian Republic Former national anthem of the Russian SFSR (briefly, alongside The Internationale)
- Lyrics: Pyotr Lavrov
- Music: Robert Schumann; Claude Joseph Rouget de Lisle (arranged by Alexander Glazunov)
- Adopted: 1917
- Relinquished: 1918
- Preceded by: "God Save the Tsar!"
- Succeeded by: "The Internationale"

Audio sample
- Worker's Marseillaise: file; help

The "Worker's Marseillaise" (Note: Russian: Рабочая Марсельеза, romanized: Rabóchaya Marselyéza, IPA: [rɐˈbotɕɪjə mərsʲɪˈlʲjezə]) is a Russian revolutionary song named after "La Marseillaise", the current national anthem of France. It is based on a poem of Pyotr Lavrov, first published on 1 July 1875 in London as "A New Song". (Note: Russian: Новая песня, romanized: Nóvaya pésnya, IPA: [ˈnovəjə ˈpʲesʲnʲə]) The poem reflects a radical socialist program and calls for the violent destruction of the Russian monarchy. At the end of 1875 or in 1876, this poem began to be sung in Russia to the melody of the last verse of Robert Schumann's song "Die beiden Grenadiere". Schumann's melody is inspired by the original Marseillaise, but is noticeably different from it. Thus, the melody of the Worker's Marseillaise is only indirectly related to the original Marseillaise, and the lyrics not at all. The song is close to the cruel romance genre, and this influenced its popularity. The name the "Worker's Marseillaise" has been fixed since the 1890s.

It existed alongside several other popular versions, among others a Soldier's Marseillaise and a Peasant's Marseillaise.

This anthem was popular during the 1905 Russian Revolution and was used as a national anthem by the Russian Provisional Government until its overthrow in the October Revolution. It remained in use by Soviet Russia for a short time alongside "The Internationale". During the 1917 Revolution it was played at all public assemblies, street demonstrations, concerts and plays.

== Lyrics ==
Russian original

Cyrillic script

Отречёмся от старого мира,
Отряхнём его прах с наших ног!
Нам враждебны златые кумиры,
Ненавистен нам царский чертог.

Мы пойдём к нашим страждущим братьям,
Мы к голодному люду пойдём,
С ним пошлём мы злодеям проклятья —
На борьбу мы его поведём.

Припев:
Вставай, поднимайся, рабочий народ!
Вставай на врага, люд голодный!
Раздайся, клич мести народной!
Вперёд, вперёд, вперёд, вперёд, вперёд!

Богачи-кулаки жадной сворой
Расхищают тяжёлый твой труд.
Твоим потом жиреют обжоры,
Твой последний кусок они рвут.

Голодай, чтоб они пировали,
Голодай, чтоб в игре биржевой
Они совесть и честь продавали,
Чтоб глумились они над тобой.

Припев

Тебе отдых — одна лишь могила.
Весь свой век недоимку готовь.
Царь-вампир из тебя тянет жилы,
Царь-вампир пьёт народную кровь.

Ему нужны для войска солдаты —
Подавай ты ему сыновей.
Ему нужны пиры и палаты —
Подавай ему крови своей.

Припев

Не довольно ли вечного горя?
Встанем, братья, повсюду зараз!
От Днепра и до Белого моря,
И Поволжье, и Дальний Кавказ!

На врагов, на собак — на богатых,
И на злого вампира — царя.
Бей, губи их, злодеев проклятых,
Засветись, лучшей жизни заря.

Припев

И взойдёт за кровавой зарёю
Солнце правды и братской любви,
Хоть купили мы страшной ценою —
Кровью нашею — счастье земли.

И настанет година свободы:
Сгинет ложь, сгинет зло навсегда,
И сольются в одно все народы
В вольном царстве святого труда.

Припев

Pre-Revolution Cyrillic

Отречёмся отъ стараго міра,
Отряхнёмъ его прахъ съ нашихъ ногъ!
Намъ враждебны златые кумиры,
Ненавистенъ намъ царскій чертогъ.

Мы пойдёмъ къ нашимъ страждущимъ братьямъ,
Мы къ голодному люду пойдёмъ,
Съ нимъ пошлёмъ мы злодѣямъ проклятья —
На борьбу мы его поведёмъ.

Припѣвъ:
Вставай, поднимайся, рабочій народъ!
Вставай на врага, людъ голодный!
Раздайся, кличъ мести народной!
Вперёдъ, вперёдъ, вперёдъ, вперёдъ, вперёдъ!

Богачи-кулаки жадной сворой
Расхищаютъ тяжёлый твой трудъ.
Твоимъ потомъ жирѣютъ обжоры,
Твой послѣдній кусокъ они рвутъ.

Голодай, чтобъ они пировали,
Голодай, чтобъ въ игрѣ биржевой
Онѣ совѣсть и честь продавали,
Чтобъ глумились они надъ тобой.

Припѣвъ

Тебѣ отдыхъ — одна лишь могила.
Весь свой векъ недоимку готовь.
Царь-вампиръ изъ тебя тянетъ жилы,
Царь-вампиръ пьётъ народную кровь.

Ему нужны для войска солдаты —
Подавай ты ему сыновей.
Ему нужны пиры и палаты —
Подавай ему крови своей.

Припѣвъ

Не довольно ли вѣчнаго горя?
Встанемъ, братья, повсюду заразъ!
Отъ Днѣпра и до Бѣлаго моря,
И Поволжье, и Дальній Кавказъ!

На враговъ, на собакъ — на богатыхъ,
И на злого вампира — царя.
Бей, губи ихъ, злодѣевъ проклятыхъ,
Засвѣтись, лучшей жизни заря.

Припѣвъ

И взойдётъ за кровавой зарёю
Солнце правды и братской любви,
Хоть купили мы страшной цѣною —
Кровью нашею — счастье земли.

И настанетъ година свободы:
Сгинетъ ложь, сгинетъ зло навсегда,
И сольются въ одно всё народы
Въ вольномъ царствѣ святаго труда.

Припѣвъ

Transliteration

Otrechomsya ot starogo mira,
Otryakhnom yego prakh s nashikh nog!
Nam vrazhdebny zlatyye kumiry,
Nenavisten nam tsarskiy chertog.

My poydyom k nashim strazhdushchim brat'yam,
My k golodnomu lyudu poydyom,
S nim poshlyom my zlodeyam proklyat'ya —
Na bor'bu my yego povedyom.

Pripev:
Vstavay, podnimaysya, rabochiy narod!
Vstavay na vraga, lyud golodnyy!
Razdaysya, klich mesti narodnoy!
Vperyod, vperyod, vperyod, vperyod, vperyod!

Bogachi-kulaki zhadnoy svoroy
Rashishchayut tyazholyy tvoy trud.
Tvoim potom zhireyut obzhory,
Tvoy posledniy kusok oni rvut.

Goloday, chtob oni pirovali,
Goloday, chtob v igre birzhevoy
Oni sovest' i chest' prodavali,
chtob glumilis' oni nad toboy.

Pripev

Tebe otdykh — odna lish' mogila.
Ves' svoy vek nedoimku gotov'.
Tsar'-vampir iz tebya tyanet zhily,
Tsar'-vampir p'yot narodnuyu krov'.

Yemu nuzhny dlya voyska soldaty —
Podavay ty yemu synovey.
Yemu nuzhny piry i palaty —
Podavay yemu krovi svoyey.

Pripev

Ne dovol'no li vechnogo gorya?
Vstanem, brat'ya, povsyudu zaraz —
Ot Dnepra i do Belogo morya,
I Povolzh'ye, i Dal'niy Kavkaz.

Na vragov, na sobak — na bogatykh,
I na zlogo vampira — tsarya.
Bey, gubi ikh, zlodeyev proklyatykh,
Zasvetis', luchshey zhizni zarya.

Pripev

I vzoydyot za krovavoy zaroyu
Solntse pravdy i bratskoy lyubvi,
Khot' kupili my strashnoy tsenoyu —
Krov'yu nasheyu — schast'ye zemli.

I nastanet godina svobody:
Sginet lozh', sginet zlo navsegda,
I sol'yutsya v odno vse narody
V vol'nom tsarstve svyatogo truda.

Pripev

IPA transcription

[ɐ.trʲɪ.ˈtɕemʲ.sʲə ɐ.t‿ˈsta.rə.və ˈmʲi.rə |]
[ɐ.trʲɪ.ˈxnʲem jɪ.ˈvo prax s‿ˈna.ʂɨx nok ǁ]
[nam vrɐʐ.ˈdʲeb.nɨ ˈzɫa.tɨ.je kʊ.ˈmʲi.rɨ |]
[ˈnʲe.nə.vʲɪ.sʲtʲɪn nam ˈtsar.sʲkʲɪj tɕɪr.ˈtok ǁ]

[mɨ pɐj.ˈdʲɵm k‿ˈna.ʂɨm ˈstraʐ.dʊ.ɕːɪm ˈbra.tʲjəm |]
[mɨg‿ɡɐ.ˈlod.nə.mʊ ˈlʲʉ.dʊ pɐj.ˈdʲɵm ǁ]
[s‿nʲim pɐʂ.ˈlʲɵm mɨ‿zɫɐ.ˈdʲe.jəm prɐ.ˈklʲæ.tʲjə |]
[nə bɐrʲ.ˈbu mɨ jɪ.ˈvo pə.vʲɪ.ˈdʲɵm ǁ]

[prʲɪ.ˈpʲef]
[fstɐ.ˈvaj ǀ pə.dɨ.ˈmaj.sʲə ǀ rɐ.ˈbo.tɕɪj nɐ.ˈrot |]
[fstɐ.ˈvaj nə vrɐ.ˈɡof ǀ brad‿ɡɐ.ˈɫod.nɨj ǁ]
[rɐz.ˈdaj.sʲə ǀ krʲik mʲɪ.ˈsʲtʲi nɐ.ˈrod.nəj |]
[fʲpʲɪ.ˈrʲɵt ǀ fʲpʲɪ.ˈrʲɵt ǀ fʲpʲɪ.ˈrʲɵt ǀ fʲpʲɪ.ˈrʲɵt ǀ fʲpʲɪ.ˈrʲɵt ǁ]

[bə.ɡɐ.ˈtɕi ǀ kʊ.ɫɐ.ˈkʲi ˈʐad.nəj ˈsvo.rəj |]
[rə.s⁽ʲ⁾xʲɪ.ˈɕːæ.jʊt tʲɪ.ˈʐo.ɫɨj tvoj trut ǁ]
[tvɐ.ˈim pɐ.ˈtom ˈʐɨ.rɪ.jʊt ɐb.ˈʐo.rɨ |]
[tvoj pɐsʲ.ˈlʲedʲ.nʲɪj kʊ.ˈsok ɐ.ˈnʲi‿rvut ǁ]

[ɡə.ɫɐ.ˈdaj ǀ ʂtop ɐ.ˈnʲi pʲɪ.rɐ.ˈva.lʲɪ |]
[ɡə.ɫɐ.ˈdaj ǀ ʂtob‿v‿ɪ.ˈɡrʲe bʲɪr.ʐɨ.ˈvoj ǁ]
[ɐ.ˈnʲi ˈso.vʲɪsʲtʲ i tɕes⁽ʲ⁾tʲ prə.dɐ.ˈva.lʲɪ |]
[ʂtop rʊ.ˈɡa.lʲɪsʲ ɐ.ˈnʲi nə tɐ.ˈboj ǁ]

[prʲɪ.ˈpʲef]

[tʲɪ.ˈbʲe ˈod.dɨx ǀ ɐd.ˈna lʲiʂ mɐ.ˈɡʲi.ɫə |]
[ˈkaʐ.dɨj dʲenʲ ǀ nʲɪ.dɐ.ˈim.kʊ ɡɐ.ˈtofʲ ǁ]
[tsarʲ vɐmʲ.ˈpʲir ɪs tʲɪ.ˈbʲæ ˈtʲæ.nʲɪt ˈʐɨ.ɫɨ |]
[tsarʲ vɐmʲ.ˈpʲir p⁽ʲ⁾jɵt nə.rɐd.ˈnu.jʊ krofʲ ǁ]

[jɪ.ˈmu nʊʐ.ˈnɨ dʲlʲæ vɐj.ˈska sɐɫ.ˈda.tɨ |]
[pə.dɐ.ˈvaj ʐɨ sʲʊ.ˈda sɨ.nɐ.ˈvʲej ǁ]
[jɪ.ˈmu nʊʐ.ˈnɨ pʲɪ.ˈrɨ da pɐ.ˈɫa.tɨ |]
[pə.dɐ.ˈvaj jɪ.ˈmu ˈkro.vʲɪ tvɐ.ˈjej ǁ]

[prʲɪ.ˈpʲef]

[nʲɪ dɐ.ˈvolʲ.nə lʲi ˈvʲetɕ.nə.və ɡɐ.ˈrʲa |]
[ˈfsta.nʲɪm ǀ ˈbra.tʲjə ǀ pɐ.ˈfʲsʲʉ.dʊ zɐ.ˈras ǁ]
[ɐd‿ˈdʲnʲe.prə i də ˈbʲe.ɫə.və mɐ.ˈrʲæ |]
[i pɐ.ˈvoɫ.ʐʲjɪ ǀ i ˈdalʲ.nʲɪj kɐf.ˈkas ǁ]

[nə vɐ.ˈrof ǀ nə sɐ.ˈbak ǀ nə bɐ.ˈɡa.tɨx |]
[də nə ˈzɫo.və vɐmʲ.ˈpʲi.rə tsɐ.ˈrʲa ǁ]
[bʲej ǀ ɡʊ.ˈbʲi ix ǀ zɫɐ.ˈdʲe.jɪf ˈpro.klʲɪ.tɨx |]
[zəsʲ.vʲɪ.ˈtʲisʲ ǀ ˈɫu.tʂːɨj ˈʐɨzʲ.nʲɪ zɐ.ˈrʲa ǁ]

[prʲɪ.ˈpʲef]

[i‿vzɐj.ˈdʲɵd zə krɐ.ˈva.vəj zɐ.ˈrʲɵ.jʊ |]
[ˈson.tsə ˈprav.dɨ i ˈbrat.stvə lʲʉ.ˈdʲej ǁ]
[ˈku.pʲɪm mʲir ɨ pɐsʲ.ˈlʲedʲ.nʲɪj bɐrʲ.ˈbo.jʊ |]
[ˈku.pʲɪm ˈkro.vʲjʊ mɨ ˈɕːæsʲ.tʲje dʲɪ.ˈtʲej ǁ]

[i nɐ.ˈsta.nʲɪd ɡɐ.ˈdʲi.nə svɐ.ˈbo.dɨ |]
[ˈzʲɡʲi.nʲɪt ɫoʂ ǀ ˈzʲɡʲi.nʲɪd zɫo nə.fʲsʲɪg.ˈda ǁ]
[i sɐ.ˈlʲjʉ.tsːə vʲ‿jɪ.ˈdʲi.nə nɐ.ˈro.dɨ |]
[v‿ˈvolʲ.nəm ˈtsar.sʲtʲvʲe sʲvʲɪ.ˈto.və trʊ.ˈda ǁ]

[prʲɪ.ˈpʲef]

English translation

Let us denounce the old world,
Let us shake its dust from our feet!
We are enemies to the golden idols,
We detest the Imperial palace!

We will go among the suffering bretheren,
We will go to the starving people;
With them we send our curses to the evil-doers,
We will lead them to the fight.

Refrain:
Rise up, rise up, working people!
Rise up against the enemy, hungry people!
Ring out, people's cry of vengeance!
Forward, forward, forward, forward, forward!

The rich kulaks with their greedy hordes
Steal your hard labor.
Your sweat makes the gluttons fat,
They tear up your last morsel.

Starve, so that they could feast,
Starve, so that on the stock market
They could sell their conscience and honor,
So that they could mock you.

Refrain

Your rest is but a grave.
All your life struggle to find money to pay arrears.
The vampire tsar is sucking the life out of you,
The vampire tsar drinks the people's blood.

He needs soldiers for his army.
Give him your sons!
He needs feasts and palaces.
Give him your blood!

Refrain

Isn't eternal sorrow enough?
Let's rise up, brothers, everywhere at once.
From the Dnieper to the White Sea,
And the Volga and the Far Caucasus.

On the enemies, on the dogs, on the rich,
And the evil vampire tsar.
Fight them, kill them, the damned villains,
Light up, the dawn of the better life.

Refrain

And after the bloody dawn
The sun of truth and brotherly love will rise,
Though we've paid a terrible price —
With our blood, we bought the happiness of the land.

And the era of freedom will come:
The lies will be gone, the evil will be gone forever,
And all nations will unite into one
In the free kingdom of holy labor.

Refrain

== See also ==
- « La Marseillaise de la Commune », French revolutionary song created and used by the Paris Commune in 1871
- „Deutsche Arbeiter-Marseillaise“, German revolutionary song

== Bibliography ==
- Figes, Orlando (2014). A People's Tragedy: The Russian Revolution 1891–1924. London: The Bodley Head. ISBN 9781847922915.
