= La Vandeana =

English: The Vendéen
- Symbol of the Catholic and Royal Army of Vendée
- anthem of Ordine Nuovo; Counter-revolutionaries

La Vandeana (English: The Vendéen) is an Italian song focusing on the topic of the counter-revolution against the Jacobins' anticlerical republican system by Royalists and Catholics during the War in the Vendée in France. The folk song is popular in traditionalist circles and it was also used by intransigent radical right cultural organisation Ordine Nuovo as their group anthem. Various slightly different versions of the song have been recorded, including versions by Contea and Settimo Sigillo.

== Lyrics ==
Italian lyrics (Verse I) Ride la piazza e urla al sangue che colora il collo dei soldati fedeli alla corona, che sopra i ceppi hanno baciato il giglio dell'onore; che col sorriso hanno gettato di sfida il guanto ancora. (Verse II) Siamo del re ladri e cavaliere e nella notte noi andiamo. E il vento freddo del terrore no non ci potrà fermare. L'oro che noi rubiamo con onore dentro i nostri cuori splende come il bel simbolo d'amore che al trono ci legò. (Verse III) Spade della Vandea, falci della boscaglia, baroni e contadini, siamo pronti alla battaglia per giustiziare chi tagliò il giglio là sulla ghigliottina per riabbracciare il sole di Francia sulle nostre colline. (Verse IV) Siamo del re ladri e cavalieri e nella notte noi andiamo. E il vento freddo del terrore no non ci potrà fermare. Se un rosso fiore nasce in petto a noi è sangue di chi crede ancora di chi combatte la Rivoluzione (gli avversari) di uomini d'onore. (Verse V) Nei cieli devastati da giudici plebei dall'odio degl'uomini, dal pianto degli eroi, nasce un bel fiore che i cavalieri portano sui mantelli. È il bianco giglio che ha profumato il campo dei ribelli. (Verse VI) Sanguina il Sacro Cuore, sulla nostra bandiera, e nella notte inizia l'ultima mia preghiera. Vergine Santa salva la Francia dalla maledizione rinasca il fiore della vittoria: Controrivoluzione. (Verse VII) Siamo del re ladri e cavalieri e nella notte noi andiamo. E il vento freddo del terrore no non ci potrà fermare. L'oro che noi rubiamo con onore dentro i nostri cuori splende come il bel simbolo d'amore che al trono ci legò.	English translation (Verse I) The square laughs and shouts at the blood that colours The neck of the soldiers loyal to the crown That above the stump kissed the lily of honour With a grin they threw down the glove in challenge again (Verse II) We are robbers and knights of the King, in the night we go The cold wind of terror will not be able to stop us The gold that we rob with honour Within our hearts it shines Like the beautiful symbol of love That bound us to the throne (Verse III) Swords of Vandea, Scythes of the wood, Barons and peasants, we are ready for battle To execute those who cut the lily (Fleur-de-lis), up there on the guillotine To embrace again the French sun on our hill (Verse IV) We are the robbers and knights of the king, in the night we go The cold wind of terror will not be able to stop us If a red flower sprouts in our midst It is the blood of those who still believe Of those who fight the revolution Of men of honour (Verse V) In the skies devastated by plebeian judges, By the hatred of men, by the lament of the heroes Sprouts a beautiful flower that the knights wore on their cloaks It is the white lily that perfumed the field of the rebels (Verse VI) The Sacred Heart bleeds on our flag And in the night my last prayer starts. Blessed Virgin save France from the curse Sprout again the flower of victory: Counterrevolution (Verse VII) We are the robbers and knights of the king, in the night we go The cold wind of terror will not be able to stop us The gold that we rob with honour Inside our hearts it shines Like the beautiful symbol of love That tied us to the throne

== See also ==
- La Marseillaise des Blancs
- Oriamendi
