= Adolf Hepner =

German-American writer (1846–1923)

Adolf Hepner (November 24, 1846 – April 26, 1923) was a German-American writer. His association with the SPD led to him being a co-defendant in the Leipzig high treason trial. He was a journalist for papers in both Germany and in the United States.

== Early life and education ==
Adolf Hepner was born on November 24, 1846, in Schmiegel, Posen (modern day Śmigiel, Poland). He went to the gymnasium school in Lissa (modern day Leszno) before his stint in a Breslau Rabbinical seminary. He attended college at the University of Breslau (modern day University of Wrocław) before he went to college at the University of Berlin.

== Career ==
In 1868, Hepner began to become a socialist and he moved on to Leipzig where became an editor for a socialistic paper. He was associated with Wilhelm Liebknecht and August Bebel around his time at the paper.

In 1872 he was tried for high treason and soon acquitted with his treason charges stemming from Hepner promoting socialist activities through journalism. His co defendants, Liebknecht and Bebel weren't acquitted like he was.

Later that year, Hepner violated Leipzig police director Ruder's prohibition when he visited the International Workers' Congress of the International Workers Association. Hepner took a delegate with him as he met Karl Marx and some similar people whom he knew personally as he got ready for his speech. On September 6, 1872, at The Hague, Hepner made a speech in support of German workers where he expressed his views on how the lack of authority felled the commune. Hepner was put in jail not too long after in part due to Hepner offending the chief constable but he was soon released.

Back at the Der Volksstaat, Hepner's rocky relationship with Theodor Yorck eventually led to Hepner being let go of his role at the paper.

Hepner moved to Breslau after he was forced out of Leipsic and subsequently he began a failed job as a publisher for his A. Hepner Breslau publishing house.

Hepner moved to St. Louis in 1886 after emigrating to the United States four years earlier due to the oppression he faced there as a socialist. He got back into editing as he was an editor for the St. Louis Tageblatt where he worked for ten years from 1888 to 1898. He was also hired to edit the Westliche Post, where he worked for some years.

== Later life and death ==
Hepner went back to Germany in 1908, where he became a writer for the Die Neue Zeit, Süddeutsche Monatshefte and similar publications. Hepner died on April 26, 1923.

== Works ==
Hepner wrote various political essays like America's Aid to Germany in 1870-1871 in 1904 and other works like a one act play titled Good Night, Schatz in 1894.
