= La Marseillaise de la Commune =

Composition by Claude Joseph Rouget de Lisle

English: The Marseille of the Commune
- Anthem of Paris Commune
- Lyrics: Mme Jules Faure, 1871
- Music: Claude Joseph Rouget de Lisle, 1792
- Adopted: March 1871
- Relinquished: May 1871

Audio sample
- La Marseillaise de la Commune (Instrumental): file; help

"La Marseillaise de la Commune" is a version of "La Marseillaise", the national anthem of France, which was created and used by the Paris Commune in 1871.

== Lyrics ==
French text

Français! Ne soyons plus esclaves!,
Sous le drapeau, rallions-nous,
Sous nos pas, brisons les entraves,
(×2) Quatre-vingt-neuf, réveillez-vous
Frappons du dernier anathème
Ceux qui, par un stupide orgueil,
Ont ouvert le sombre cercueil
De nos frères morts sans emblème.

Refrain
Chantons la liberté,
Défendons la cité,
Marchons, marchons, sans souverain,
Le peuple aura du pain.

Depuis vingt ans que tu sommeilles,
Peuple français, réveille-toi,
L’heure qui sonne à tes oreilles,
(×2) C’est l’heure du salut pour toi.
Peuple, debout ! que la victoire
Guide au combat tes fiers guerriers,
Rends à la France ses lauriers,
Son rang et son antique gloire.

Refrain

Les voyez-vous ces mille braves
Marcher à l’immortalité,
Le maître a vendu ses esclaves,
(×2) Et nous chantons la liberté.
Non, plus de rois, plus de couronnes,
Assez de sang, assez de deuil,
Que l’oubli dans son froid linceul
Enveloppe sceptres et trônes.

Refrain

Plus de sanglots dans les chaumières
Quand le conscrit part du foyer;
Laissez, laissez, les pauvres mères
(×2) Près de leurs fils s’agenouiller.
Progrès ! que ta vive lumière
Descende sur tous nos enfants,
Que l’homme soit libre en ses champs,
Que l’impôt ne soit plus barrière.

Refrain

N’exaltez plus vos lois nouvelles,
Le peuple est sourd à vos accents,
Assez de phrases solennelles,
(×2) Assez de mots vides de sens.
Français, la plus belle victoire,
C’est la conquête de tes droits,
Ce sont là tes plus beaux exploits
Que puisse enregistrer l’histoire.

Refrain

Peuple, que l’honneur soit ton guide,
Que la justice soit tes lois,
Que l’ouvrier ne soit plus avide
(×2) Du manteau qui couvrait nos rois.
Que du sien de la nuit profonde
Où l’enchaînait la royauté,
Le flambeau de la Liberté
S’élève et brille sur le monde!

Refrain

English translation

French people, let us no longer be slaves!
Under the flag, let us rally,
Under our feet, let us break the shackles,
(×2) people of 1789, wake up,
Let us strike the last curse
those who out of foolish pride,
have opened the dark coffin
of our brothers who died without the emblem.

Refrain:
Sing of freedom,
Defend the city,
March on, march on, without a sovereign,
The people will have bread.

For twenty years you have slept,
French people, wake up,
the time is ringing in your ears,
(×2) it's the time of salvation for you,
People, arise, let victory
lead to combat your proud warriors,
who give to France its laurels,
its rank and its ancient glory.

Refrain

Do you see them, these thousand braves
Walking to immortality,
The master sold his slaves,
(×2) And we sing of freedom,
No more kings, no more crowns,
Enough blood, enough mourning,
That forgetfulness in its cold shroud
Envelops scepters and thrones.

Refrain

No more tears in the cottages
When the conscript leaves the home;
Leave, leave, the poor mothers
(×2) To kneel near their sons.
Progress! May thy bright light
Descend on all our children,
So that man is free in his fields,
So that the tax is no longer a barrier.

Refrain

Do not exalt your new laws,
the people are deaf to your words,
enough of solemn phrases,
(×2) enough empty words,
French people, the most beautiful victory,
is the conquest of your rights,
these are your greatest achievements
that will be recorded in history.

Refrain

People may honor be your guide,
May justice be your laws,
May the worker no longer be hungry
(×2) from the cape which covered our kings.
From the mids of the night
Where royalty is chained,
May the Torch of Liberty
rise and shine on the world!

Refrain

== See also ==
- Worker's Marseillaise, Russian revolutionary song
- Worker's Marseillaise (German), German revolutionary song
