= Anna Blos =

German politician (1866–1933)

Member of the Weimar National Assembly
- In office 1919–1920

Personal details
- Born: 4 August 1866 Liegnitz, Prussia
- Died: 27 April 1933 (aged 66) Stuttgart, Germany

Anna Berta Antonia Blos (4 August 1866 – 27 April 1933) was a German educator and politician. In 1919 she was one of the 36 women elected to the Weimar National Assembly, the first female parliamentarians in Germany.

== Biography ==
Blos was born Anna Berta Antonia Tomaczewska in Liegnitz in Prussia in 1866. She was educated at the Prince Wilhelm Foundation in Karlsruhe and then attended the University of Berlin, where she studied history, literature and languages. She subsequently became a teacher and the first woman in Germany to become a member of a local school board.

She founded and became chairwoman of the Association of Stuttgart Housewives and was an executive member of the Württemberg Association for Women's Voting Rights. In 1905 she married Wilhelm Blos, who later became president of the state of Württemberg. After joining the Social Democratic Party of Germany, she became a member of the regional executive board. She was a candidate for the party in the 1919 federal elections, becoming one of the first group of women elected to the Weimar National Assembly.

She died in Stuttgart in 1933 and was buried in the Prague cemetery.
