= Der Wahre Jacob =

Satirical magazine in German Empire (1879–1933)

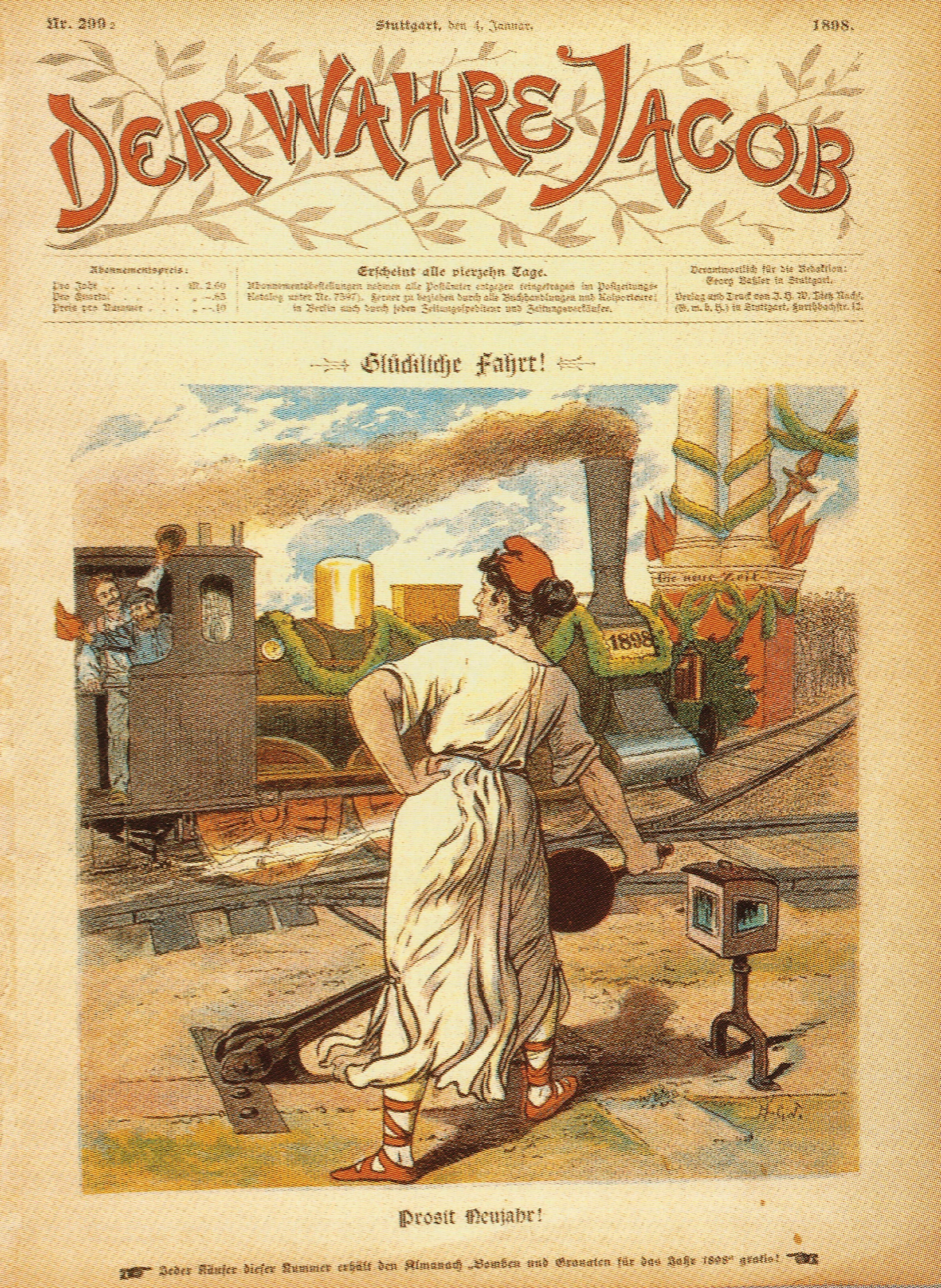
- Cover page of the issue 299 dated 4 January 1898
- Editor-in-chief: Friedrich Wendel
- Former editors: Wilhelm Blos; Georg Bassler; Berthold Heymann
- Categories: Satirical magazine; Political magazine
- Frequency: Biweekly
- Founder: Johann Heinrich Wilhelm Dietz; Wilhelm Blos
- Founded: 1879
- Final issue: 25 February 1933
- Country: German Empire
- Based in: Hamburg; Stuttgart
- Language: German

Der Wahre Jacob (German: The True Jacob) was a German biweekly satirical magazine which had a social democratic political stance and was an organ of the Social Democratic Party (SPD). It was in circulation between 1879 and 1933 and based first in Hamburg, and in Stuttgart in German Empire.

== History and profile ==
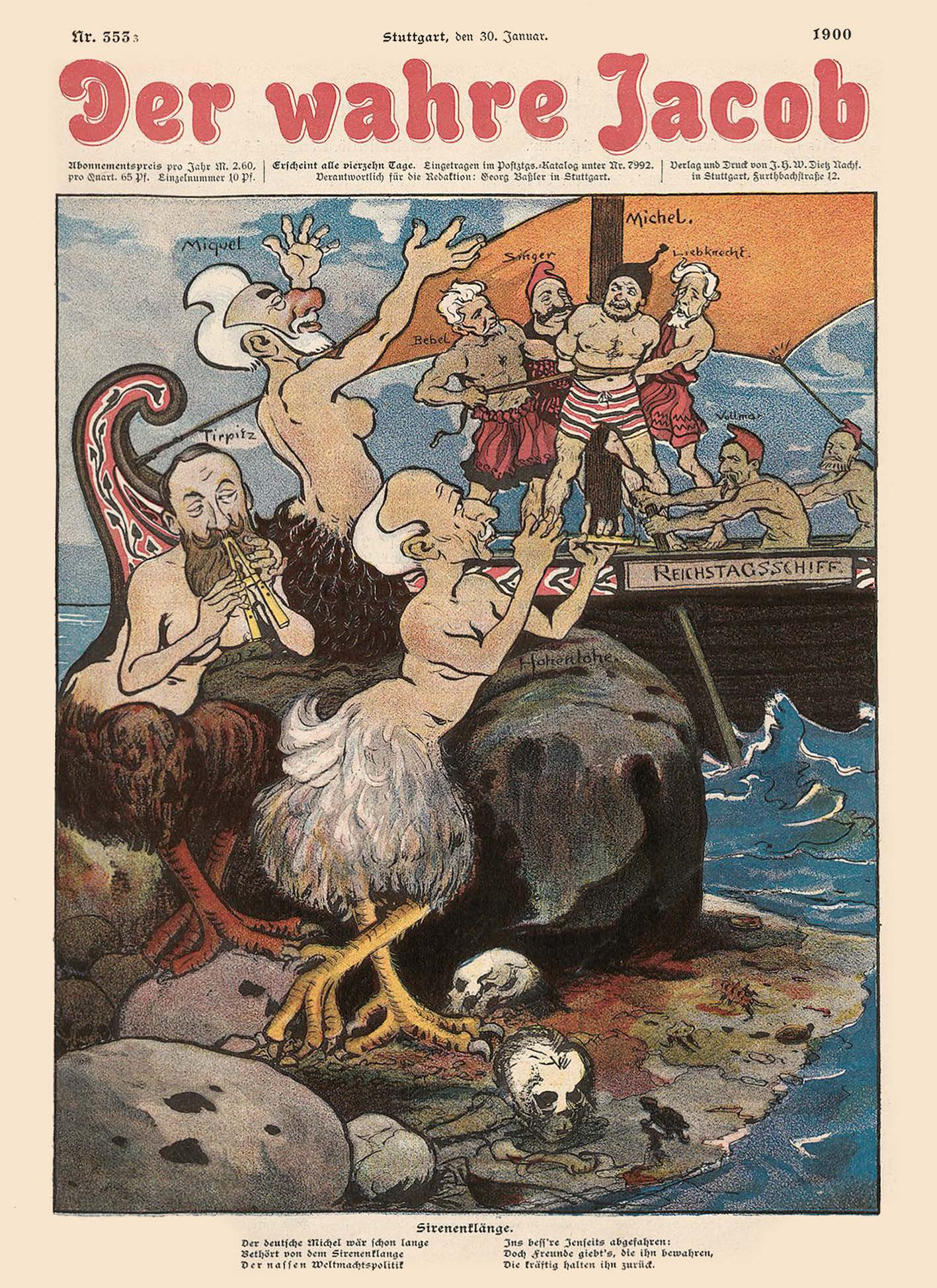
Cover page of Der Wahre Jacob dated 1900

Der Wahre Jacob was launched in Hamburg in 1879. Its founders were Johann Heinrich Wilhelm Dietz and Wilhelm Blos who were serving at the Parliament. The former was also the publisher of Der Wahre Jacob. The ultimate goal set for the magazine was "to fight for the rights of the working classes in its peculiar and effective way." The magazine was mostly read by the members of the SPD.

Due to the passing of anti-socialist laws Der Wahre Jacob was banned by the Hamburg state government in 1881 just after twelve issues. In 1884 the magazine was restarted by Johann Heinrich Wilhelm Dietz in Stuttgart and from 1888 it was published on a biweekly basis. In 1910 another SPD magazine Süddeutscher Postillon was merged with Der Wahre Jacob.

Because of the economic crisis experienced in the country the magazine published its last issue in 1923. It resumed publication in 1924, but its title was changed as Lachen links, and it was published with this title until 1927. In July 1927 the magazine was restarted with its original title, Der Wahre Jacob. Shortly after the beginning of the Nazi rule in the country the magazine ceased publication and the Social Democratic Party was banned in 1933 due to their sharp opposition to the National Socialism. The last issue of Der Wahre Jacob appeared on 25 February that year.

== Content ==
Der Wahre Jacob published mostly articles about current events of politics which were concerned with the development of social democracy and labor movement. It featured these political contents via color illustrations and caricatures. The magazine frequently criticised Bernhard von Bülow, Otto von Bismarck and the policies of the German Reich. In the late 1920s and early 1930s it adopted an anti-Communist approach and advocated the view that "communists were devious, alien, destructive and perhaps even sub-human."

== Editor-in-chiefs and contributors ==
Der Wahre Jacob was edited by the following: Wilhelm Blos (1879-1880; 1884-1887), Georg Bassler (1890-1900), Berthold Heymann (1901-1919) and Friedrich Wendel (1927-1933). Major contributors included Victor Adler, Arno Holz, Erich Mühsam, Clara Müller-Jahnke, Alexander Roda Roda and Emil Rosenow. Kurt Tucholsky also published articles in the magazine.

== Circulation ==
Der Wahre Jacob sold 40,000 copies in 1887 and 100,000 copies in 1890. The circulation of the magazine was 230,000 copies in 1908. Its circulation raised to 300,000 copies in 1911 and to 380,500 copies in 1912. However, in 1914 when World War I began its circulation decreased by half. The magazine managed to sell 200,000 copies in 1919.
