= HaAderet v'HaEmunah =

Hymn/Jewish prayer

HaAderet v'HaEmunah (Hebrew: הָאַדֶּרֶת וְהָאֱמוּנָה, romanized: Hā'Addērēṯ VĕHā'Ĕmūnā, 'The Glory and the Faith'), commonly referred to as LeChai Olamim (Hebrew: לְחַי עוֹלָמִים, romanized: LĕḤāy ʿŌlāmīm), is a piyyut, or Jewish liturgical poem, sung or recited during Shacharit of Yom Kippur in virtually all Ashkenazic communities, and on Shabbat mornings in Chassidic communities.

== Origin ==
The source of this piyyut is originally found in Hekhalot Rabbati ("Greater Palaces"), a mystical text dating from the sixth century which describes the spiritual ascent of Rabbi Ishmael ben Elisha. In Hekhalot Rabbati, it is said that Rabbi Ishmael heard the singing of angels and wrote this hymn as he had heard it. The 10th-century paytan Meshullam ben Kalonymos versified the piyyut, adapting it for the Yom Kippur liturgy.

== Form and content ==
HaAderet v'HaEmunah is written in the form of an alphabetical acrostic, as is common in the Hebrew Bible and subsequent pieces of Jewish liturgy. Each line lists two divine attributes which begin with the same letter, and then ends with the phrase lechai olamim ("to [He] who lives forever").

== Use in prayer ==
In the Ashkenazic rite, this piyyut is recited prior to the kedusha in shacharit of Yom Kippur; in fact, the Magen Avraham quotes from Yaakov ben Moshe Levi Moelin that it is inappropriate to recite this holy piyyut publicly at any time other than Yom Kippur. In Nusach Sefard, it is also recited weekly as a part of Shabbat morning prayers, during Pesukei dezimra, as well as on Yom Tov; however, many who follow Nusach Sefard recite it silently out of deference to the Magen Avraham and the Maharil.

HaAderet v'HaEmunah is also sung in hakafot during Simchat Torah in many communities.

== Melodies ==
=== Simchas Torah ===
In many communities, on Simchas Torah, this piyyut is sung in a responsive manner. A leader calls out the first two words of each verse, to which the congregation will respond with, Tzu Vemen, tzu Vemen? L'chai Olamim! (Yiddish: צו וועמען, צו וועמען, lit. 'To whom, to whom?'). At various points (often after every two verses), the congregation will sing Mihu Zeh, v'eizeh Hu? Zeh E-li Va'anveihu! (Hebrew: מי הוא זה ואיזה הוא? זה א-לי ואנוהו, lit. 'Who is This, and who is He? This is my God and I will beautify Him!'). The song is often accompanied by jumping up and down to the beat.

Different people may or may not act as the leader throughout the piyyut.

=== Chassidic melodies ===
==== Chabad ====
In Chabad there are several tunes to the words of this piyyut:

- The earliest tune to this piyyut associated with Chabad is that of La Marseillaise, the French national anthem. During one of the Lubavitcher Rebbe's farbrengens, when addressing a French audience in 1974, HaAderet v'HaEmunah was sung to that tune. In 1995, the tune appeared on the album "The Rebbe's Nigunim" by Avi Piamenta.
- One melody is attributed to Reb Shlomo der Geller, of Nevel, Russia, and has been added to the Sefer Hanigunim book published by Kehot Publication Society. It was released in the 1966 on the album Chabad Nigunim Vol. 6, performed by the Chabad Choir under the direction of Yosef Marton, with Abraham Lider as soloist.
- One tune has been performed under the name "Uncle Dodi", which is on the album Tzamah 4 by Kobi Aflalo and Tzamah, a Chabad-affiliated musical collaboration. It has also been performed by Benny Friedman, as well as by Doron Twister.

==== Other ====
The Hasidic courts of Boyan and Toldos Aharon also have unique melodies for HaAderet v'HaEmunah.

== Other instances ==
A line from this piyyut was adapted as the title of a journal published by Yosef Yitzchak Schneersohn in 1940, Hakeri'ah vehakedusha ("The Declaration and the Holiness").

== See also ==
- Well-known piyyutim
- Jewish services
- Machzor
