= La Marseillaise des Blancs =

National anthem of France

English: The Marseille [Song] of the 'Blancs'
- The flag of the Blancs, sown with lilies
- anthem of French Royalists
- Adopted: 1793

La Marseillaise des Blancs (English: The Marseille [Song] of the 'Blancs') is a royalist and Catholic adaptation of the French national anthem, La Marseillaise. The lyrical content of the Royal and Catholic variation is strongly counter-revolutionary and originated from the War in the Vendée in 1793, where locals attempted to resist the republican forces. The name "Blancs" refers to their use of royal white flags and symbols.

== Lyrics ==
In the first verse, the term "blues" refers to the revolutionary republicans—the Jacobins. The Rodrigue mentioned in the second verse refers to François-Ambroise Rodrigue, a local bishop who collaborated with the Revolution, contrary to papal authority. Similarly, the "treasonous priests" in the fourth verse refers to certain "Constitutional priests", who swore loyalty to the government of the republican regime over the Pope; priests who refused such an oath had their parishes taken away from them and were replaced. In the same verse, the Camus mentioned is Armand-Gaston Camus, Secretary of the Revolutionary Convention, who played a major role in seizing Church property and the regicide of the King of France.

French lyrics (Verse I) Allons armée catholique Le jour de gloire est arrivé! Contre nous de la république L’étendard sanglant est levé (repeat) Entendez-vous dans nos campagnes Les cris impurs des scélérats? Ils viennent jusque dans vos bras Prendre nos filles, nos femmes! (Refrain) Aux armes vendéens! Formez vos bataillons! Marchez, marchez, le sang des bleus Rougira nos sillons! (Verse II) Quoi des infâmes hérétiques Feraient la loi dans nos foyers? Quoi des muscardins de boutiques Nous écraseraient sous leurs pieds? (repeat) Et le Rodrigue abominable Infâme suppôt du démon S’installerait en la maison De notre Jésus adorable (Refrain) (Verse III) Tremblez pervers et vous timides, La bourrée des deux partis Tremblez, vos intrigues perfides, Vont enfin recevoir leur prix (repeat) Tout est levé pour vous combattre De Saint Jean d’Monts à Beaupréau, D’Angers à la ville d’Airvault, Nos gars ne veulent que se battre (Refrain) (Verse IV) Chrétiens, vrais fils de l’Eglise, Séparez de vos ennemis La faiblesse à la peur soumise Que verrez en pays conquis (repeat) Mais ces "citoyens" sanguinaires Mais les adhérents de Camus Ces prêtres jureurs et intrus Cause de toutes nos misères (Refrain) (Verse V) Ô sainte Vierge Marie Conduis, soutiens nos bras vengeurs! Contre une séquelle ennemie, Combats avec tes zélateurs! (repeat) A vos étendards la victoire, Est promise assurément Que le régicide expirant, Voie ton triomphe et notre gloire! (Refrain)	English translation (Verse I) Arise, ye Catholic Army The day of glory has arrived! Against us, the Republic's Blood-stained banner has been raised (repeat) Do you hear in our countryside The impure cries of wretches? Who come right into your arms To take our daughters, our wives! (Refrain) To arms, Vendéeans! Form your battalions! March, march, the blood of the blues shall redden our furrows! (Verse II) What about the infamous heretics Who'd make the law in our homes? What about the cowardly mercenaries Who'd crush us below their feet? (repeat) And abominable Rodrigue Infamous henchman of the demon, who'd settle in the house of our beloved Jesus? (Refrain) (Verse III) Tremble ye perverse and timid, the drunk of both parties Tremble, your perfidious intrigues, Shall finally receive their due (repeat) All are raised to fight against you From Saint Jean d’Monts to Beaupréau, From Angers to the town of Airvault, Our lads desire only to fight (Refrain) (Verse IV) Christians, true sons of the Church, separate from your enemies! The weak, submissive to fear, Who you shall see in conquered land(repeat) But these bloody "citizens," But the allies of Camus, these intruding, swearing priests Are the cause of all our miseries (Refrain) (Verse V) O Blessed Virgin Mary, Lead and sustain our avenging arms! Against the enemy mob, fight with thy zealous warriors! (repeat) Before thy flags, Victory is promised assuredly May the expiring regicide, See thy triumph and our glory! (Refrain)

== See also ==
- La Vandeana
- Oriamendi
