= Deutsche Arbeiter-Marseillaise =

1864 German socialist song

The "German Workers' Marseillaise" is a socialist song written in 1864 by Jacob Audorf for the General German Workers' Association to the melody of French national anthem "La Marseillaise".

== Lyrics ==
German original

I
Wohlan, wer Recht und Wahrheit achtet,
zu unsrer Fahne steh allzuhauf!
Wenn auch die Lüg uns noch umnachtet,
bald steigt der Morgen hell herauf!
Ein schwerer Kampf ist’s den wir wagen,
zahllos ist unsrer Feinde Schar.
Doch ob wie Flammen die Gefahr
mög über uns zusammenschlagen!

Refrain:
Nicht fürchten wir den Feind,
stehn wir im Kampf vereint!
Marsch, marsch, marsch, marsch!
und sei’s durch Qual und Not,
für Freiheit, Recht und Brot!

II
Von uns wird einst die Nachwelt zeugen,
schon blickt auf uns die Gegenwart.
Frisch auf, beginnen wir den Reigen,
ist auch der Boden rau und hart.
Schließt die Phalanx in dichten Reihen!
Je höher uns umrauscht die Flut,
je mehr mit der Begeisterung Glut
dem heiligen Kampfe uns zu weihen!

Refrain

III
Auf denn, Gesinnungskameraden,
bekräftigt heut aufs neu den Bund,
dass nicht die grünen Saaten
gehn vor dem Erntefest zugrund,
Ist auch der Säemann gefallen,
in guten Boden fiel die Saat,
uns aber bleibt die kühne Tat,
heil aber bleibt die Tat,
heilges Vermächtnis sei sie allen!

Refrain

English translation

I
Now then, whoever respects law and truth,
let us all to our flag rise!
Even if the lies still delude us,
soon the morning will brightly rise!
'Tis a difficult fight to which we dare,
too many to number are our enemies
Indeed even if the danger
bursts over us like flames!

Refrain:
We fear not the enemy,
united we stand in the fight!
March, march, march, march!
be it suffering and dread,
For freedom, justice and bread!

II
Posterity will one day bear witness to us,
the present is already looking at us.
Fresh up, let us start the dance,
even if the soil is rough and hard.
Form the phalanx into close ranks!
The higher we are girt by the tide,
the more we'll glow with enthusiasm
to dedicate ourselves to the holy struggle!

Refrain

III
So then, like-minded comrades,
confirm the covenant anew today,
So that the green crops don't perish
before the harvest festival,
Even if the sower has fallen,
the seed in good soil fell,
But with us the bold deed remains,
but intact the deed remains,
May it be a holy legacy to all!

Refrain

=== Alternate refrain ===
For the funeral of Ferdinand Lassalle, the refrain was rewritten:

Nicht zählen wir den Feind,
nicht die Gefahren all!
Marsch, marsch, marsch, marsch
Der kühnen Bahn nun folgen wir,
die uns geführt Lasalle!

Which translates to English as:

We fear not the enemy,
nor the dangers at all!
March, march, march, march!
We now follow the bold path,
the one into which Lasalle guided us!
