= La Marseillaise =

National anthem of France

English: The Song of Marseille
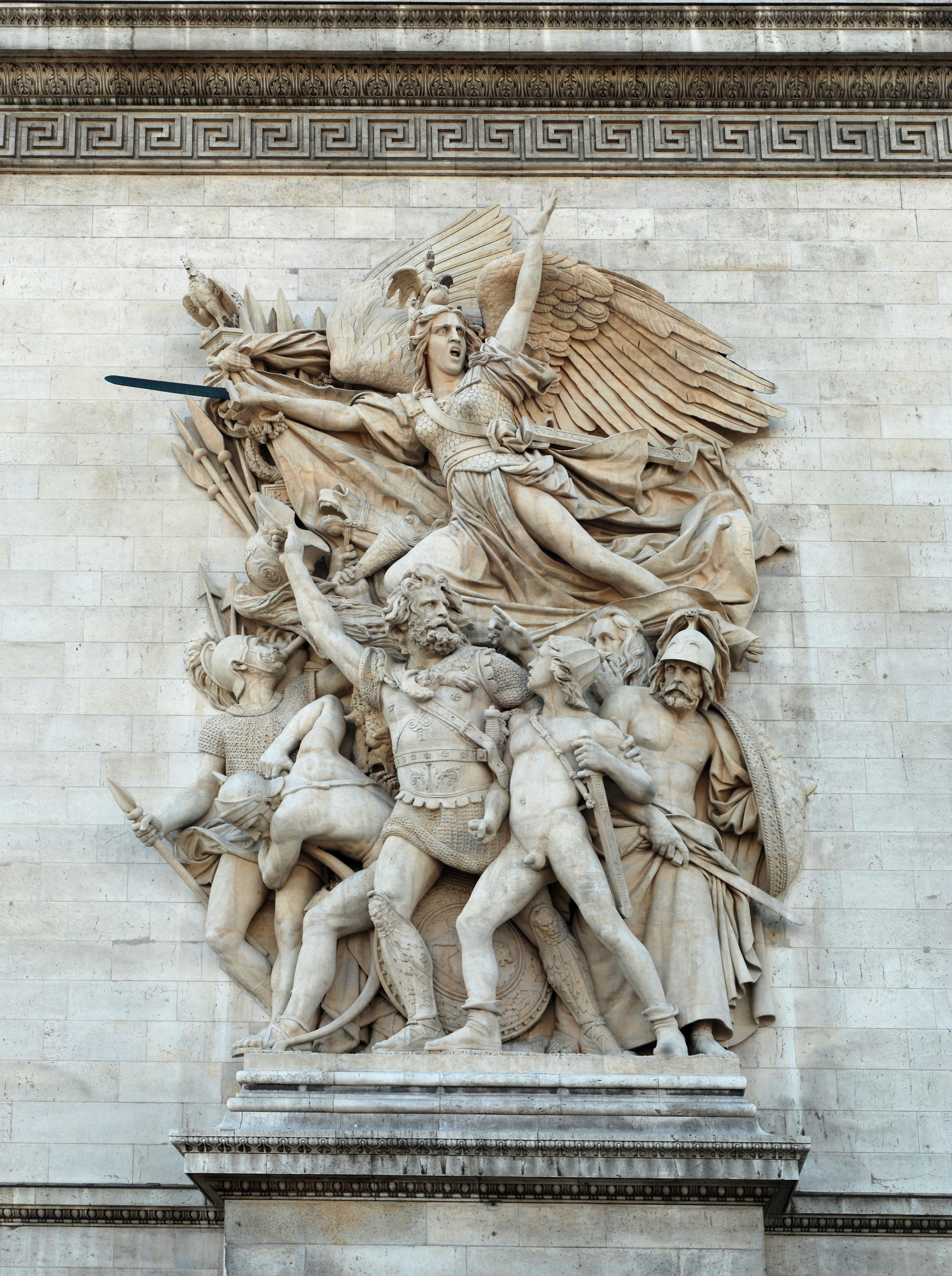
- The Marseillais volunteers departing, sculpted on the Arc de Triomphe
- National anthem of France
- Also known as: « Chant de Guerre pour l'Armée du Rhin » (English: "War Song for the Army of the Rhine")
- Lyrics: Claude Joseph Rouget de Lisle, 1792
- Music: Claude Joseph Rouget de Lisle, 1792
- Adopted: 14 July 1795
- Readopted: 1879
- Relinquished: 1799

Audio sample
- Instrumental rendition in A♭ major: file; help

"La Marseillaise" (Note: English pronunciation: /ˌmɑːrseɪˈ(j)ɛz/ MAR-say-(Y)EZ; French: [la maʁsɛjɛːz]) is the national anthem of France. It was written in 1792 by Claude Joseph Rouget de Lisle in Strasbourg after the Kingdom of the French declared war against Austria, and was originally titled "Chant de Guerre pour l'Armée du Rhin" ("War Song for the Army of the Rhine"). (Note: pronounced [ʃɑ̃ də ɡɛːʁ puʁ laʁ.me dy ʁɛ̃])

The French National Convention adopted it as the First Republic's anthem in 1795. The song acquired its nickname after being sung in Paris by Fédérés (volunteers) from Marseille marching to the capital. Its evocative melody and lyrics have led to its widespread use as a song of revolution and its incorporation into many pieces of classical and popular music.

In 2013, the Italian violinist Guido Rimonda pointed out that the incipit of Giovanni Battista Viotti's "Tema e variazioni in Do maggiore" strongly resembles the anthem. This incipit was first thought to have been published before "La Marseillaise", but that appears to be a misconception, as Viotti published several variations on "La Marseillaise" in 1795 and wrote as a note "I have never composed the quartets below" (Je n'ai jamais composé les quatuors ci dessous).

== History ==
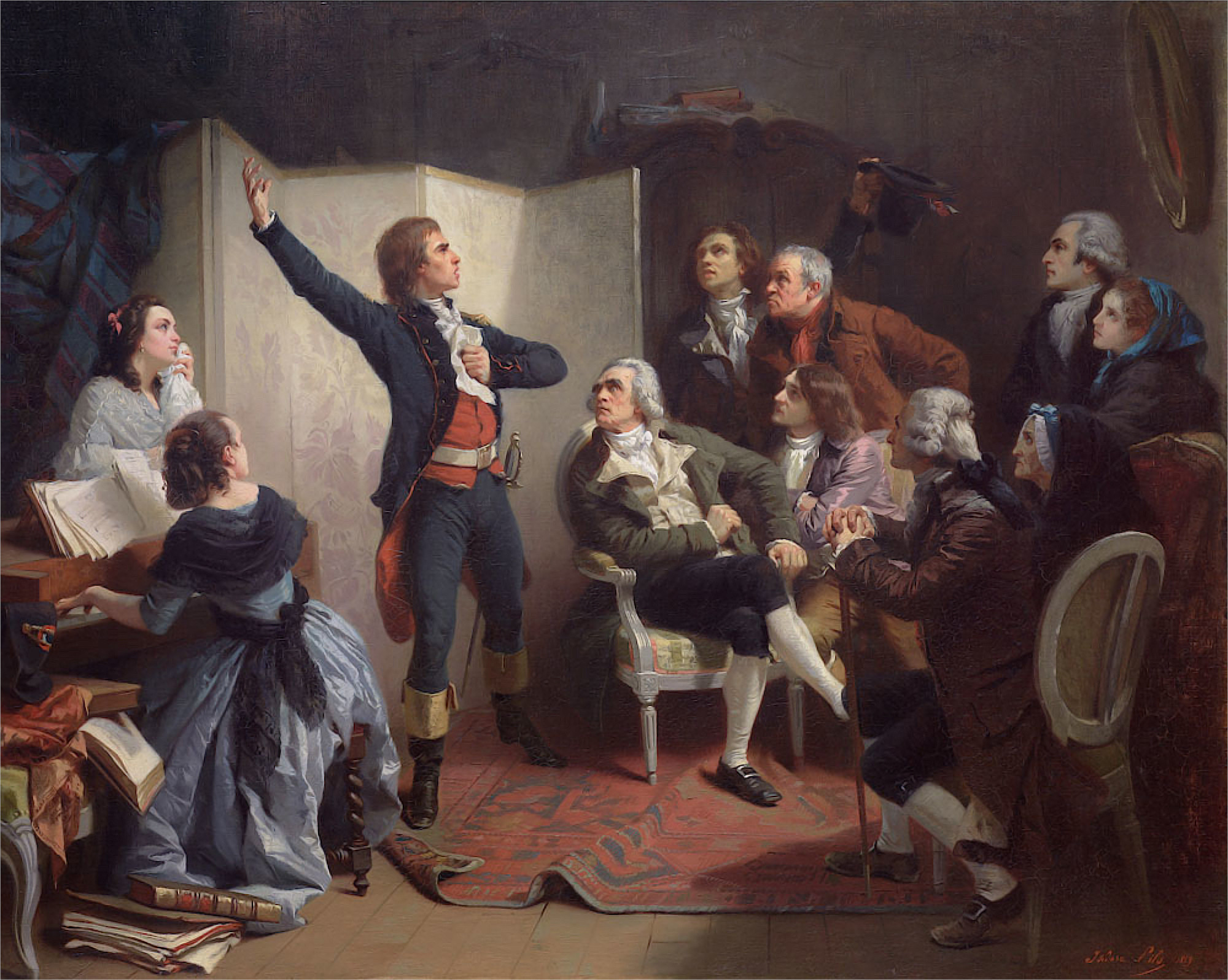
Rouget de Lisle, composer of "La Marseillaise", sings the song for the first time at the home of Dietrich, Mayor of Strasbourg (1849 painting by Isidore Pils, Musée historique de Strasbourg).

As the French Revolution continued, Europe's monarchies became concerned that revolutionary fervour would spread to their countries. The War of the First Coalition was an effort to stop the revolution, or at least restrict it to France. Initially, the French army did not distinguish itself, and Coalition armies invaded France. On 25 April 1792, Baron Philippe Friedrich Dietrich, the mayor of Strasbourg and Worshipful Master of the local Masonic lodge, asked his Freemason guest Rouget de Lisle to compose a song "that will rally our soldiers from all over to defend their homeland that is under threat". That evening, Rouget de Lisle wrote "Chant de guerre pour l'Armée du Rhin" ("War Song for the Army of the Rhine"), and dedicated the song to Marshal Nicolas Luckner, a Bavarian freemason in French service from Cham. A plaque on the building on Place Broglie where de Dietrich's house once stood commemorates the event. De Dietrich was executed the next year during the Reign of Terror.

The melody soon became the rallying call to the French Revolution and was adopted as "La Marseillaise" after the melody was first sung on the streets by volunteers (fédérés) from Marseille by the end of May. The fédérés entered Paris on 30 July 1792 after a young volunteer from Montpellier, François Mireur, had sung it at a patriotic gathering in Marseille, and the troops adopted it as the National Guard of Marseille's marching song. The song quickly became a form of musical propaganda, spreading revolutionary ideals and uniting citizens through its patriotic lyrics and stirring melody. A newly qualified medical doctor, Mireur later became a general under Napoleon and died in Egypt at age 28.

The song's lyrics reflect the invasion of France by foreign armies (from Prussia and Austria) that was under way when it was written. Strasbourg itself was attacked just a few days later. The invading forces were repulsed from France after their defeat in the Battle of Valmy. As the vast majority of Alsatians did not speak French, a German version ("Auf, Brüder, auf dem Tag entgegen") was published in October 1792 in Colmar.

Belgian singer Jean Noté singing "La Marseillaise" in 1907

The Convention accepted it as the French national anthem in a decree passed on 14 July 1795, making it France's first anthem. It lost this status under Napoleon I, and the song was banned outright by Louis XVIII and Charles X, being reinstated only briefly after the July Revolution of 1830. During Napoleon I's reign, Veillons au salut de l'Empire was the regime's unofficial anthem, and under Napoleon III, it was "Partant pour la Syrie", but the government reinstated "La Marseillaise" in an attempt to motivate the French people during the Franco-Prussian War. During the 19th and early 20th centuries, La Marseillaise was recognised as the anthem of the international revolutionary movement; as such, it was adopted by the Paris Commune in 1871, albeit with new lyrics under the title "La Marseillaise de la Commune". It was reinstated as France's national anthem in 1879 and has remained so since.

=== Music ===
Several musical antecedents have been cited for the melody:

- Tema e variazioni in Do maggiore, a work by the Italian violinist Giovanni Battista Viotti; the 1781 dating of the manuscript has been questioned, but it seems to have been published after "La Marseillaise", in 1795.
- Mozart's Allegro maestoso from the Piano Concerto No. 25 (composed in 1786).
- The oratorio Esther by Jean Baptiste Lucien Grison (composed in 1787).

Other attributions (the credo of the fourth Mass by Holtzmann of Mursberg) have been refuted.

== Lyrics ==
Generally only the first verse is sung.

French original (Note: The French language has spacing before some punctuation marks, such as the exclamation and question marks when typed.)

Allons enfants de la Patrie,
Le jour de gloire est arrivé !
Contre nous de la tyrannie
𝄆 L'étendard sanglant est levé, 𝄇
Entendez-vous dans les campagnes
Mugir ces féroces soldats ?
Ils viennent jusque dans vos bras
Égorger vos fils, vos compagnes !

Refrain :
𝄆 Aux armes, citoyens,
Formez vos bataillons, (Note: Also sung as « Formons nos bataillons »)
Marchons, marchons ! (Note: Also sung as « Marchez, marchez ! »)
Qu'un sang impur
Abreuve nos sillons ! 𝄇

Que veut cette horde d'esclaves,
De traîtres, de rois conjurés ?
Pour qui ces ignobles entraves,
𝄆 Ces fers dès longtemps préparés ? 𝄇
Français, pour nous, ah ! quel outrage
Quels transports il doit exciter!
C'est nous qu'on ose méditer
De rendre à l'antique esclavage !

Refrain

Quoi ! des cohortes étrangères
Feraient la loi dans nos foyers !
Quoi ! Ces phalanges mercenaires
𝄆 Terrasseraient nos fiers guerriers! 𝄇
Grand Dieu ! Par des mains enchaînées
Nos fronts sous le joug se ploieraient
De vils despotes deviendraient
Les maîtres de nos destinées !

Refrain

Tremblez, tyrans et vous perfides
L'opprobre de tous les partis,
Tremblez ! vos projets parricides
𝄆 Vont enfin recevoir leurs prix ! 𝄇
Tout est soldat pour vous combattre,
S'ils tombent, nos jeunes héros,
La terre en produit de nouveaux,
Contre vous tout prêts à se battre !

Refrain

Français, en guerriers magnanimes,
Portez ou retenez vos coups !
Épargnez ces tristes victimes,
𝄆 À regret s'armant contre nous. 𝄇
Mais ces despotes sanguinaires,
Mais ces complices de Bouillé,
Tous ces tigres qui, sans pitié,
Déchirent le sein de leur mère !

Refrain

Amour sacré de la Patrie,
Conduis, soutiens nos bras vengeurs
Liberté, Liberté chérie,
𝄆 Combats avec tes défenseurs ! 𝄇
Sous nos drapeaux que la victoire
Accoure à tes mâles accents,
Que tes ennemis expirants
Voient ton triomphe et notre gloire !

Refrain

Couplet des enfants : (Note: The seventh verse was not part of the original text; it was added in 1792 by an unknown author.)
Nous entrerons dans la carrière
Quand nos aînés n'y seront plus,
Nous y trouverons leur poussière
𝄆 Et la trace de leurs vertus 𝄇
Bien moins jaloux de leur survivre
Que de partager leur cercueil,
Nous aurons le sublime orgueil
De les venger ou de les suivre.

Refrain

IPA transcription (Note: See Help:IPA/French, French phonology and French of France.)

[a.lõ.z‿ɑ̃.fɑ̃ də la pa.tʁi.ə |]
[lə ʒuʁ də glwaʁ ɛ.t‿a.ʁi.ve ‖]
[kõ.tʁə nu də la ti.ʁa.ni.ə |]
𝄆 [le.tɑ̃.daʁ sɑ̃.glɑ̃.t‿ɛ lə.ve ‖] 𝄇
[ɑ̃.tɑ̃.de vu dɑ̃ le kɑ̃.pa.ɲə |]
[my.ʒiʁ se fe.ʁɔ.sə sɔl.da ‖]
[il vjɛ.nə ʒys.kə dɑ̃ vo bʁɑ |]
[e.gɔʁ.ʒe vo fis vo kõ.pa.ɲə ‖]

[ʁə.fʁɛ̃]:
𝄆 [o.z‿aʁ.mə si.twa.jɛ̃ |]
[fɔʁ.me vo ba.ta.jõ |]
[maʁ.ʃõ | maʁ.ʃõ ‖]
[kœ̃ sɑ̃ ɛ̃.pyʁ |]
[a.bʁœ.və no si.jõ ‖] 𝄇

[kə vø sɛ.tə ɔʁ.də dɛs.kla.və |]
[də tʁɛ.tʁə də ʁwa kõ.ʒy.ʁe ‖]
[puʁ ki se.z‿i.ɲɔ.blə.z‿ɑ̃.tʁa.və |]
𝄆 [se fεʁ de lõg.tɑ̃ pʁe.pa.ʁe ‖] 𝄇
[fʁɑ̃.sɛ puʁ nu a kɛl u.tʁa.ʒə |]
[kɛl tʁɑ̃s.pɔʁ.z‿il dwa.t‿ɛk.si.te ‖]
[sɛ nu kõ.n‿o.zə me.di.te |]
[də ʁɑ̃.dʁ‿a lɑ̃.tik ɛs.kla.va.ʒə ‖]

[ʁə.fʁɛ̃]

[kwa de ko.ɔʁ.tə.z‿e.tʁɑ̃.ʒɛ.ʁə |]
[fə.ʁe la lwa dɑ̃ no fwa.je ‖]
[kwa se fa.lɑ̃.ʒə mɛʁ.sə.nɛ.ʁə |]
𝄆 [tɛ.ʁa.sə.ʁe no fje gɛ.ʁje ‖] 𝄇
[gʁɑ̃ djø paʁ de mɛ̃.z‿ɑ̃.ʃɛ.ne.ə |]
[no fʁõ su lə ʒu sə plwa.ʁɛ ‖]
[də vil dɛs.pɔ.tə də.vjɑ̃.dʁɛ |]
[le mɛ.tʁə də no dɛs.ti.ne.ə ‖]

[ʁə.fʁɛ̃]

[tʁɑ̃.ble ti.ʁɑ̃.z‿e vu pɛʁ.fi.də |]
[lɔ.pʁɔ.bʁə də tu le paʁ.ti ‖]
[tʁɑ̃.ble vo pʁɔ.ʒe pa.ʁi.si.də |]
𝄆 [võ.t‿ɑ̃.fɛ̃ ʁə.sə.vwaʁ lœʁ pʁi ‖] 𝄇
[tu.t‿ɛ sɔl.da puʁ vu kõ.ba.tʁə |]
[sil tõ.bə no ʒœ.nə e.ʁo ‖]
[la tɛ.ʁ‿ɑ̃ pʁɔ.dɥi də nu.vo |]
[kõ.tʁə vu tu pʁɛ.z‿a sə ba.tʁə ‖]

[ʁə.fʁɛ̃]

[fʁɑ̃.sɛ ɑ̃ gɛ.ʁje ma.ɲa.ni.mə |]
[pɔʁ.te.z‿u ʁə.tə.ne vo ku ‖]
[e.paʁ.ɲe se tʁis.tə vik.ti.mə |]
𝄆 [a ʁə.gʁe saʁ.mɑ̃ kõ.tʁə nu ‖] 𝄇
[me.se dɛs.pɔ.tə sɑ̃.gi.nɛ.ʁə |]
[me.se kõ.pli.sə də bwi.je ‖]
[tu.se ti.gʁə ki sɑ̃ pi.tje |]
[de.ʃi.ʁə lə sɛ̃ də lœʁ mɛ.ʁə ‖]

[ʁə.fʁɛ̃]

[a.muʁ sa.kʁe də la pa.tʁi.ə |]
[kõ.dɥi su.tjɛ̃ no bʁa vɑ̃.ʒœʁ ‖]
[li.bɛʁ.te li.bɛʁ.te ʃe.ʁi.ə |]
𝄆 [kõ.ba.z‿a.vɛk te de.fɑ̃.sœʁ ‖] 𝄇
[su no dʁa.po kə la vik.twa.ʁə |]
[a.kuʁ a.te mɑ.lə.z‿a.ksɑ̃ ‖]
[kə.te.z‿ɛ.nə.mi.z‿ɛks.pi.ʁɑ̃ |]
[vwa tõ tʁi.õ.pe nɔ.tʁə glwa.ʁə ‖]

[ʁə.fʁɛ̃]

[ku.plɛ de.z‿ɑ̃.fɑ̃]:
[nu.z‿ɑ̃.tʁə.ʁõ dɑ̃ la ka.ʁjɛ.ʁə |]
[kɑ̃ no.z‿ɛ.ne ni sə.ʁõ ply ‖]
[nu.z‿i tʁu.və.ʁõ lœʁ pu.sjɛ.ʁə |]
𝄆 [e la tʁa.sə də lœʁ vɛʁ.ty ‖] 𝄇
[bjɛ̃ mwɛ̃ ʒa.lu də lœʁ syʁ.vi.vʁə |]
[kə də paʁ.ta.ʒe lœʁ sɛʁ.kœj ‖]
[nu.z‿o.ʁõ lə sy.blim ɔʁ.gœj |]
[də le vɑ̃.ʒe u də le sɥi.vʁə ‖]

[ʁə.fʁɛ̃]

English translation

Let's go, children of the Fatherland,
The day of glory has arrived!
Against us, tyranny's
𝄆 blood-stained standard has been raised, 𝄇
Do you hear in the countryside,
The bellowing of those fierce soldiers?
They are coming right into your arms
To slit the throats of your sons, your companions!

Refrain:
𝄆 To arms, citizens,
Form your battalions
Let's march, let's march!
May impure blood
Water our furrows! 𝄇

What do they want, this horde of slaves,
Of traitors, of conjured kings?
For whom these ignoble chains,
𝄆 These long-prepared irons? 𝄇
For us, Frenchmen, ah! What outrage
What outburst it must arouse!
It's us they dare to conspire
of returning to the old slavery!

Refrain

What! These foreign cohorts
Would make the law in our homes!
What! These mercenary phalanxes
𝄆 Would strike down our proud warriors! 𝄇
Great God! With chained hands
Under the yoke we'd yield ourselves
Vile despots would become
The masters of our destinies!

Refrain

Tremble, tyrants and ye traitors
The disgrace of all parties,
Tremble! Your parricidal schemes
𝄆 Will finally receive their prize! 𝄇
Everyone is a soldier to fight you,
If our young heroes fall,
The earth will produce new ones,
Ready to fight against you!

Refrain

Frenchmen, as magnanimous warriors,
Endure or hold back your blows!
Spare these pitiful victims,
𝄆 That regret arming against us. 𝄇
But these bloodthirsty despots,
But these accomplices of Bouillé,
All these tigers who, without mercy,
Would tear apart their mother's breast!

Refrain

Sacred love of the Fatherland,
Lead, support our avenging arms
Liberty, Liberty beloved,
𝄆 Fight with your defenders! 𝄇
Under our flags may victory
Hurry to your virile accents,
So that your dying enemies
See your triumph and our glory!

Refrain

Children's verse:
We will start our career
When our elders are no more,
We will find their dust there
𝄆 And the trace of their virtues 𝄇
Much less jealous to survive them
Than to share their coffin,
We will have the sublime pride
To avenge them or follow them.

Refrain

== Cultural impact and musical adaptations ==
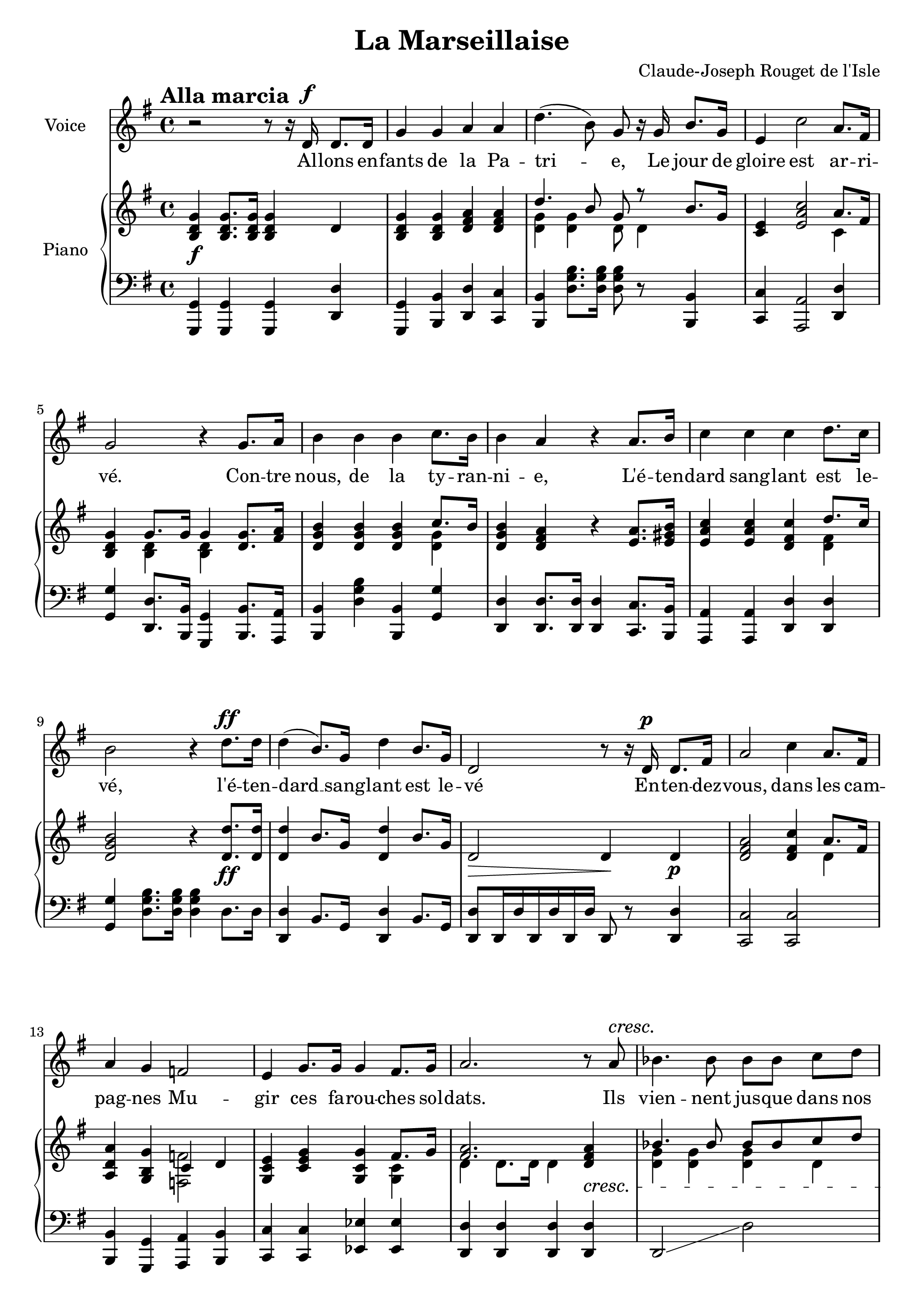
Score of the opening lines of "La Marseillaise"

"La Marseillaise" was arranged for soprano, chorus and orchestra by Hector Berlioz in about 1830.

Franz Liszt wrote a piano transcription of the anthem.

During World War I, bandleader James Reese Europe played a jazz version of "La Marseillaise".

The anthem was used as a protest song in the Korean March First Movement protests against Japanese rule in 1919.

On 14 June 1940, the day the Wehrmacht entered Paris during the Battle of France, a radio broadcast featuring "La Marseillaise" was transmitted from Paris.

=== Adaptations in other musical works ===
- Robert Schumann uses a brief quote of "La Marseillaise" in his solo piano work's Faschingsschwank aus Wien (1839) first movement, "Allegro". Singing "La Marseillaise" was forbidden in Austria at the time because "such a revolutionary piece might cause public disorder".
- Schumann also quotes the melody in the last verse of his song "Die beiden Grenadiere" (Op. 49, No. 1, 1840).
- Richard Wagner quotes the melody in the last verse of his "Les deux grenadiers" (1840).
- Thomas Wiggins quotes the melody in his "Battle of Manassas" (ca 1861).
- Pyotr Ilyich Tchaikovsky quotes "La Marseillaise" in his 1812 Overture (1880), representing the invading French Army under Napoleon (although it had not been the French national anthem at that time), and it is drowned out by cannon fire, symbolizing the Russian defense at the Battle of Borodino.
- Pavlos Carrer quotes the tune in the overture to his opera Maria Antonietta (1884).
- Julián Felipe incorporated elements of "La Marseillaise" in the fifth and last bar of his incidental piece Marcha Filipina-Magdalo (1898) which eventually became the Filipino national anthem Lupang Hinirang.
- Erik Satie's song "Un Dîner à l'Élysée" quotes the tune.
- The anthem has been sampled to reference France or Paris in countless film scores.
- Dmitri Shostakovich quotes "La Marseillaise" at some length during the fifth reel of the film score he composed for the 1929 silent movie The New Babylon (set during the Paris Commune), where it is juxtaposed contrapuntally with the "Infernal Galop" from Offenbach's Orpheus in the Underworld.
- The Australian rules football team the Brisbane Lions use the melody of "La Marseillaise" in their club song, which their predecessor, the Fitzroy Lions, adopted in 1952.
- The Beatles' 1967 single "All You Need Is Love" uses the opening bars of "La Marseillaise" as an introduction.
- On Simchat Torah (18–19 October) 1973, the Lubavitcher Rebbe adapted the melody to the Jewish prayer "HaAderet v'HaEmunah". In Chabad, the melody is believed to convey the idea of a "spiritual French revolution" – in that Torah should be spread around the world as an advent to the Messianic era.
- A Tribe Called Quest sampled La Marseillaise in the beginning of the track Luck of Lucien on their album from 1990, People's Instinctive Travels and the Paths of Rhythm
- Sarah Schachner used and reinterpreted the melody of "La Marseillaise" in the track "Rather Death Than Slavery" that is included in the official soundtrack to the video game Assassin's Creed Unity (2014), itself set during the French Revolution. This track was also used in 2015 in a trailer for season 5 of the TV drama Game of Thrones.

=== Historical Russian use ===
In Russia, "La Marseillaise" was used as a republican revolutionary anthem by those who knew French starting in the 18th century, almost simultaneously with its adoption in France. In 1875 Peter Lavrov, a narodnik revolutionary and theorist, wrote a Russian-language text (not a translation of the French one) to the same melody. This "Worker's Marseillaise" became one of the most popular revolutionary songs in Russia and was used in the Revolution of 1905. After the February Revolution of 1917, it was used as the semi-official national anthem of the new Russian republic. Even after the October Revolution, it remained in use for a while alongside "The Internationale".

== Critique ==
The British philosopher and reformer Jeremy Bentham, who was declared an honorary citizen of France in 1791 in recognition of his sympathies for the ideals of the French Revolution, was not enamoured of "La Marseillaise". Contrasting its qualities with the "beauty" and "simplicity" of "God Save the King", he wrote in 1796:

The War whoop of anarchy, the Marseillais Hymn, is to my ear, I must confess, independently of all moral association, a most dismal, flat, and unpleasing ditty: and to any ear it is at any rate a long winded and complicated one. In the instance of a melody so mischievous in its application, it is a fortunate incident, if, in itself, it should be doomed neither in point of universality, nor permanence, to gain equal hold on the affections of the people.

Valéry Giscard d'Estaing, President of France for most of the 1970s, said that it is ridiculous to sing about drenching French fields with impure Prussian blood as a Chancellor of the modern democratic Germany takes the salute in Paris. A 1992 campaign to change the words of the song involving more than 100 prominent French citizens, including Danielle Mitterrand, wife of then-President François Mitterrand, was unsuccessful.

The British historian Simon Schama discussed "La Marseillaise" on BBC Radio 4's Today programme on 17 November 2015 (in the immediate aftermath of the Paris attacks), saying it was "... the great example of courage and solidarity when facing danger; that's why it is so invigorating, that's why it really is the greatest national anthem in the world, ever. Most national anthems are pompous, brassy, ceremonious, but this is genuinely thrilling. Very important in the song ... is the line 'before us is tyranny, the bloody standard of tyranny has risen'. There is no more ferocious tyranny right now than ISIS, so it's extremely easy for the tragically and desperately grieving French to identify with that".

In 1979, a reggae version, "Aux armes et cætera" by Serge Gainsbourg, was received poorly by some in France, particularly in Le Figaro, where Michel Droit accused Gainsbourg of making money from the national anthem and suggesting that he was feeding antisemitism. Gainsbourg was also criticised for removing some of the military-focused aspects of the song.

== See also ==
- "A Portuguesa", the current national anthem of Portugal with a similar refrain
- "Belarusian Marseillaise", a patriotic song in Belarus
- "Chant du départ", the official anthem of the Napoleonic Empire
- "Ça Ira", another famous anthem of the French Revolution
- "Deșteaptă-te, române!", the current national anthem of Romania, sometimes referred to as the "Romanian Marseillaise"
- "Deutsche Arbeiter-Marseillaise", anthem of the General German Workers' Association
- "Gens du pays", the unofficial state song of Quebec
- "Gloria al Bravo Pueblo", the current national anthem of Venezuela, formerly called the "Venezuelan Marseillaise" and showing similarities to the "French Marseillaise"
- "La Bayamesa", the current national anthem of Cuba
- "La Marseillaise des Blancs", the Royal and Catholic variation
- "Maamme", the current national anthem of Finland, formerly a candidate anthem along with "La Marseillaise" and "The Internationale" upon the country's independence in 1917
- "Marche Henri IV", the national anthem of the Kingdom of France
- "National Anthem of Honduras", the only national anthem that mentions the French Revolution
- "Onamo, 'namo!", a Montenegrin patriotic song popularly known as the "Serbian Marseillaise"
- "The Internationale", a popular left-wing anthem, originally intended to be sung to the tune of "La Marseillaise"
- "The Women's Marseillaise", a women's suffrage protest song
- "Worker's Marseillaise", the national anthem of Russia from 1917 to 1918; written by Robert Schumann, and based on "La Marseillaise"
