= Der Volksstaat =

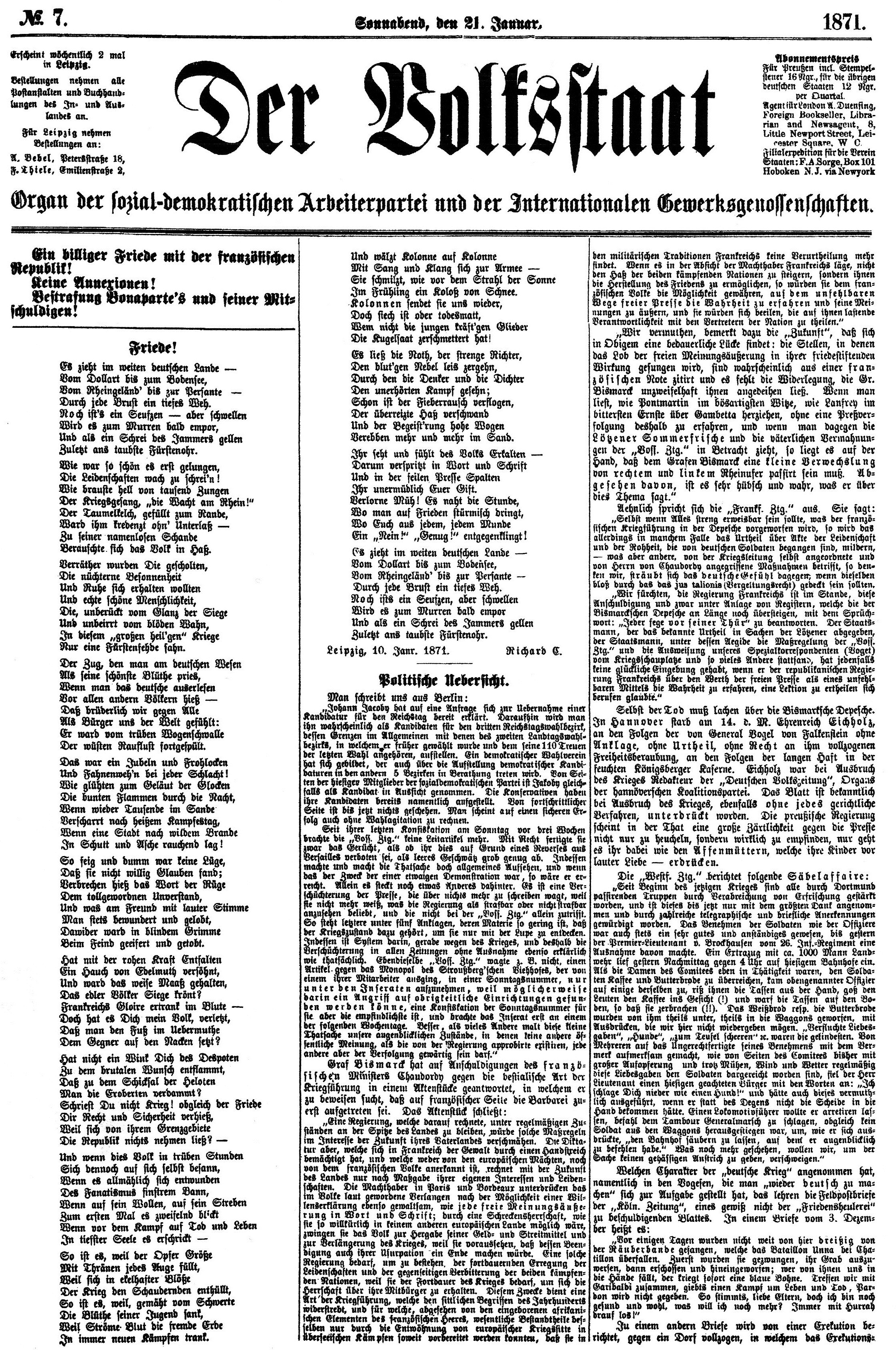
Front page, 21 January 1871

Der Volksstaat (People's State) was the central organ of the German Social Democratic Workers Party (the Eisenachers). It was published in Leipzig from October 2, 1869 to September 23, 1876. Its predecessor was Demokratisches Wochenblatt (Democratic Weekly). It was initially published twice a week, and from July 1873 three times a week. It was edited by Wilhelm Liebknecht, with help from Karl Marx and Friedrich Engels. They also contributed to the newspaper as did many other socialists including Joseph Dietzgen.

Shortly after he became a member of the Social Democratic Party of Austria (SPÖ) in 1875, Karl Kautsky published his first contributions to Der Volksstaat.
