= Maximum programme =

Series of demands aiming to achieve socialism

In Marxist praxis, a maximum programme consists of a series of demands aiming to achieve socialism. The concept of a maximum programme comes from the Erfurt Programme approved at the Congress of the Social Democratic Party of Germany (SPD) held in 1891 in Erfurt, and later mirrored by much of the Socialist International of 1889–1916. The Erfurt Programme was composed of a maximum and a minimum programme (consisting of immediate social demands). In the short term, Marxist parties were to pursue only the minimum programme of achievable demands, which would improve the lives of workers until the inevitable collapse of capitalism. "Minimalist" groups believed that the achievement of a minimum programme would enable them to become mass parties and pursue the maximum programme. Alternatively, maximalist socialists declared that they sought to implement the maximum programme, which in their view would lead to the achievement of the socialist state.

The Communist International (Comintern) of 1919–1943 initially developed the alternative idea of transitional slogans, seeing the minimum/maximum division as leaving social democratic parties always campaigning only for their minimum programme and not clearly planning a route to achieve their maximum programme,, though the eventual programme of the 1928 6th World Congress of the Comintern was more in line with a maximum programme than with transitional slogans.

== History ==
=== The Erfurt Programme ===
After the reformist approach that had shaped the SPD under the Gotha Program approved in 1875, the Erfurt Program marked for the party a partial return to Marxist theory and teachings, such as a complete break with the moderate pragmatism of Lassallean origin. However, the course of the programmatic debate in the pre-congress phase did not lead to in-depth discussions concerning the theses of Karl Marx.

==== Maximum programme ====
The Erfurt Programme consisted of an initial theoretical part, written by the philosopher and theorist of German orthodox Marxism Karl Kautsky, the maximum programme. Kautsky himself stated that he had summarized parts of Capital by Marx in drafting his document, probably referring to Chapter XXIV of Volume I and in particular to the section Historical tendency of capitalist accumulation discussed there. In his text Kautsky, referring to scientific socialism, theorized a tendency toward monopoly capitalism and the disproportionate growth of productivity, advocating the theory of the increasing separation between capitalists and the proletariat and the need to socialize the means of production, and, as the ultimate aim, the seizure of power by the working class (unlike Marx, however, Kautsky's document lacked an explicit demand for a proletarian revolution).

==== Minimum programme ====
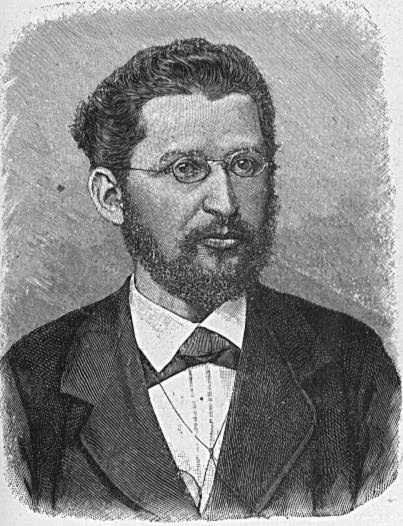
Eduard Bernstein

The second part of the Erfurt Programme, drafted by the future theorist of Marxist revisionism Eduard Bernstein, the so-called minimum programme of political action, consisted of a platform of demands in fifteen points: universal suffrage, freedom of expression and association, the eight-hour day, health care, compulsory and free public schooling, equality between men and women, and the replacement of indirect taxes with direct progressive taxes, etc.

These immediate reforms comprised political demands which, taken together, implemented important democratic-republican measures such as those enacted by the Paris Commune, and potentially culminating in the dictatorship of the proletariat. In this regard Lenin, in 1905, wrote that "the real task which the Commune had to fulfil was that of realizing the democratic dictatorship and not the socialist one", seeking first of all to realize what for a socialist party is the "minimum programme".

=== In Italy ===
==== From its emergence to party leadership ====
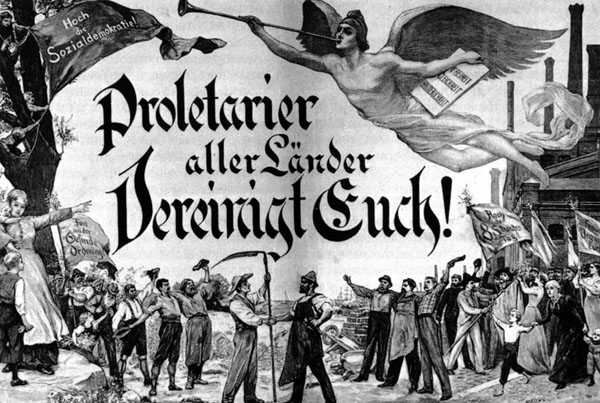
Propaganda poster reading "Workers of the world, unite!"

Maximalism was a political tendency present in Italian socialism from its inception. Alongside a Marxism close to Marx and Engels, however, the first revisionist tendencies soon appeared which, following the example of German social democracy and Bernstein's elaborations, were enormously strengthened after the first parliamentary gains and among the cadres of the labour chambers and the CGdL. Reformism, initially leading the Italian Socialist Party, was in reality a field divided into different tendencies, ranging from institutional figures of social-democratic orientation such as Leonida Bissolati, Ivanoe Bonomi and Angiolo Cabrini, through opposition parliamentary figures such as Filippo Turati and Anna Kuliscioff – key socialist figures of the Giolittian era – to intermediate positions such as those of Giuseppe Emanuele Modigliani and the then editor of Avanti!, Claudio Treves.

Maximalism, however, was not a homogeneous political faction. There were different maximalisms, with specific characteristics and sensibilities, linked to reference areas such as rural maximalism and urban maximalism, or dependent on individual personalities such as the "implementing" maximalism of Serrati, the "nihilist" maximalism of Nicola Bombacci, or the "pure" maximalism of Francesco Misiano.

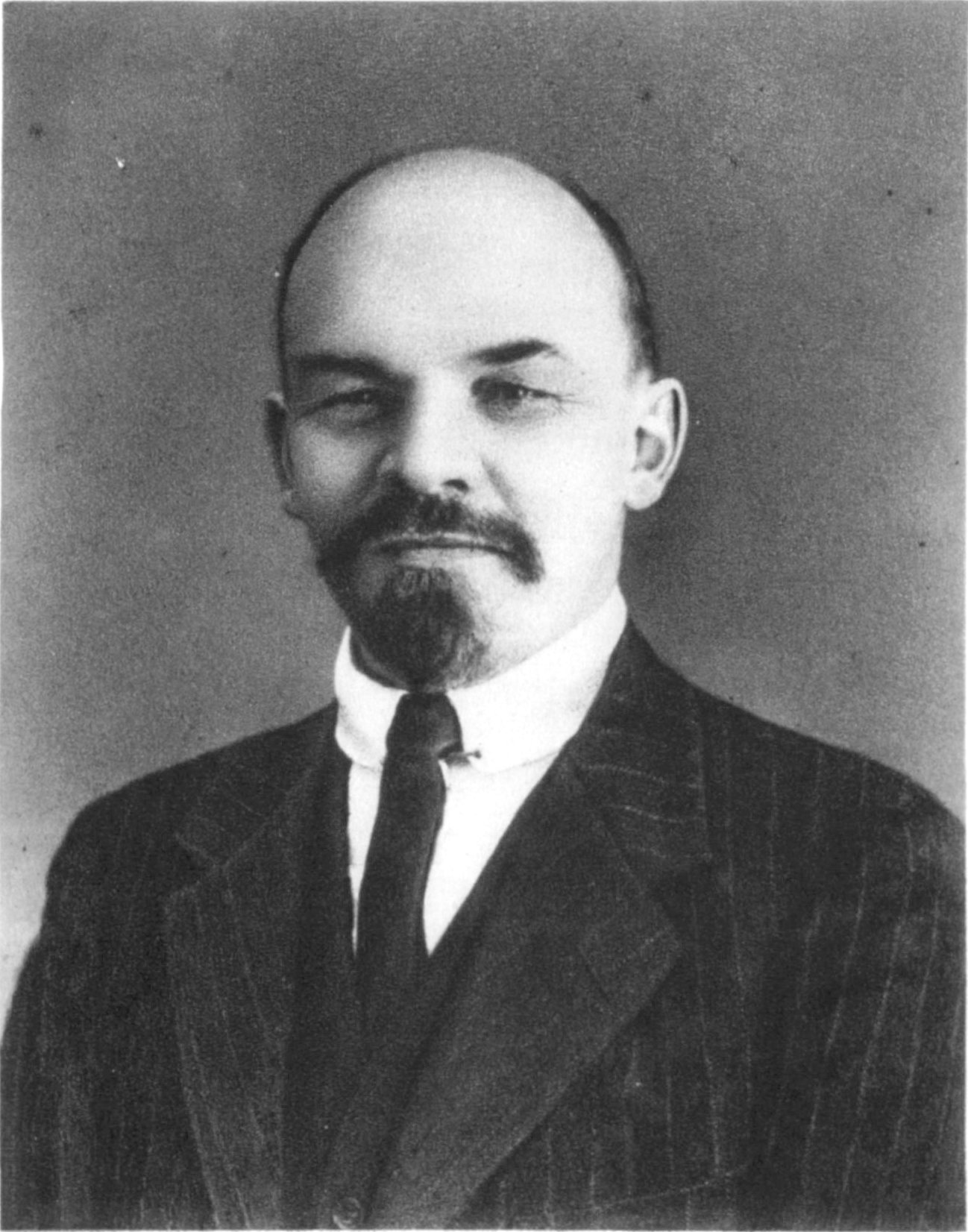
Lenin

During the 13th Congress of the Italian Socialist Party in Reggio Emilia in 1912, the maximalist component reached the party leadership. Aided by the social struggles maturing in the country and increasingly taking on an anti-colonial character, and by maximalist demands against the Italian campaign in Libya and Italian colonialism which were gaining a substantial following, decisive factors brought Costantino Lazzari and his "revolutionary intransigent" wing to the party leadership. Unprepared and driven by the social radicalization that occurred in the run-up to the war, and without having clarified its programmatic issues or formulated a transitional programme capable of leading workers to complete the maximum programme starting from the minimum one, unlike what Lenin and his Bolsheviks achieved in their own political action, the Italian maximalists were unable to lead the popular masses in a seizure of power and limited themselves to a predominantly propagandistic opposition.

==== First World War and radicalization in the Biennio Rosso ====
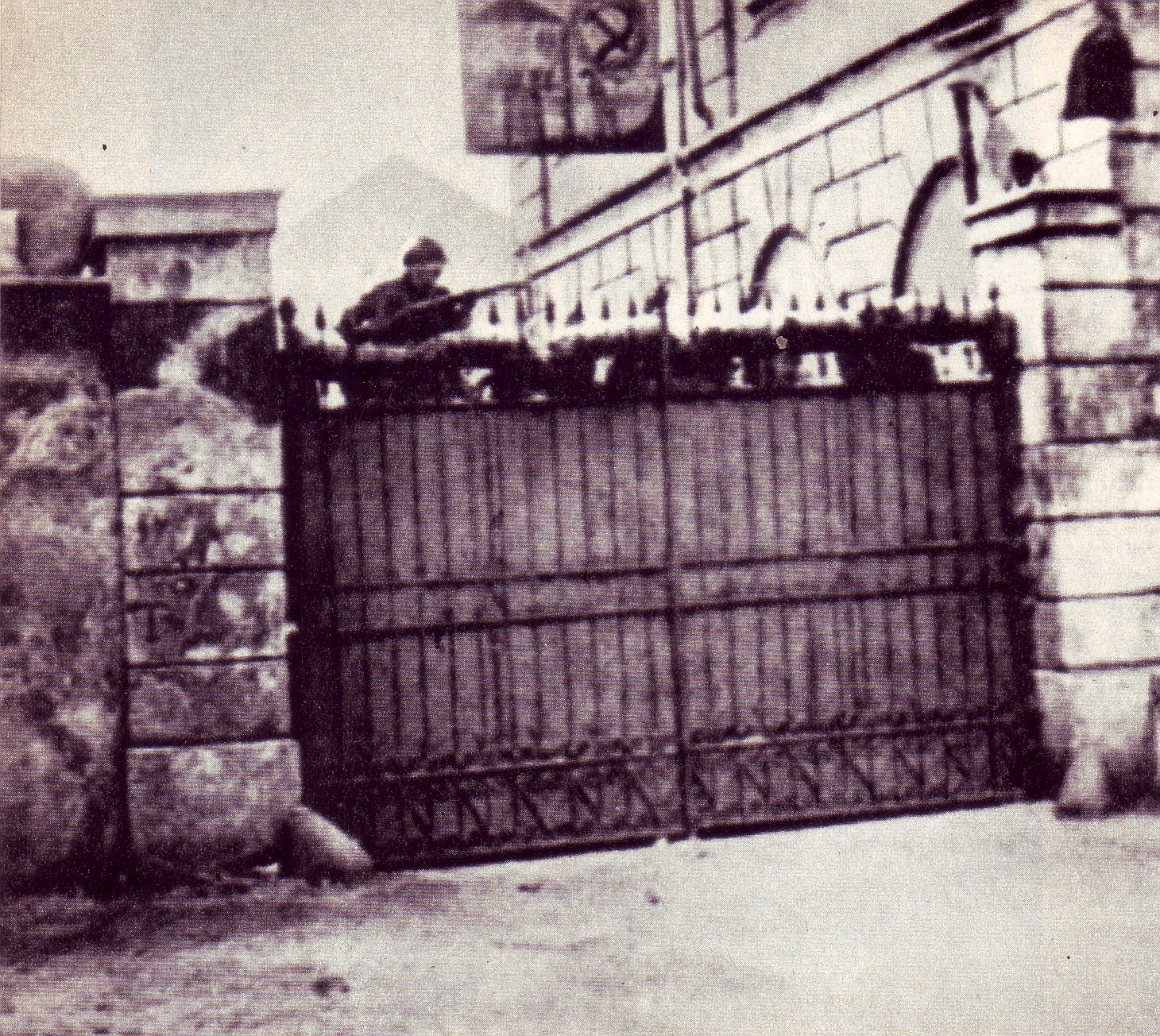
Armed workers occupy factories in Milan during the Biennio Rosso

Under the influence of the Zimmerwald and Kienthal socialist conferences, where Bolshevik positions emerged internationally, and of the misery and horrors to which the population was exposed during and after the First World War, the maximalist and revolutionary demands of the Italian Socialist Party again prevailed at the congresses of Ancona (1914) and Rome (1918). During the 16th Congress held in Bologna from 5 to 8 October 1919, on the long wave of the October Revolution in Russia and strengthened by socialist electoral success in Italy in the 1913 Italian general election, a new political programme was approved that drew on the experience of the Russian Revolution and, following the Russian example, proposed the establishment of the dictatorship of the proletariat and the creation of workers', peasants' and soldiers' soviets. Harsh criticism of the maximalist line came from the PSI's far left: Amadeo Bordiga led a faction, known as the abstentionists, who argued for complete opposition to the bourgeois system, refusing to participate in elections. In this period there were, especially in central and northern Italy, peasant mobilizations, food riots, workers' demonstrations, and occupations of land and factories, with, in some cases, attempts at self-management – early ferment of council socialism – later known as the Biennio Rosso, culminating and ending with the factory occupations of September 1920.

==== Lenin against Serrati ====
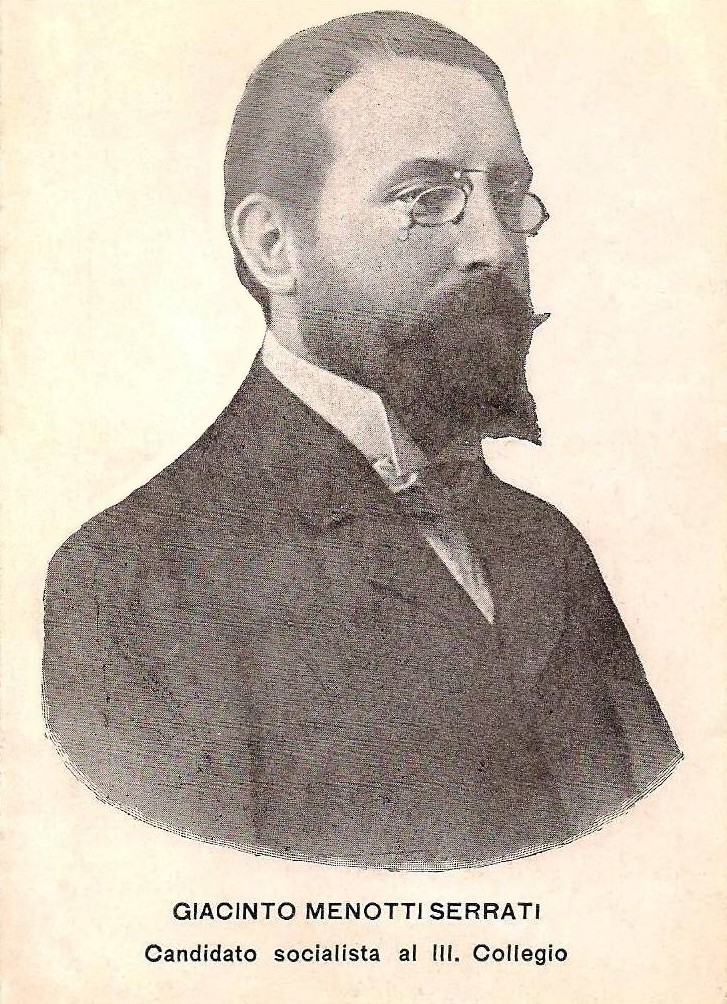
Giacinto Menotti Serrati

Tempering the allegedly negative performance of the maximalist leadership under Lazzari and Serrati was Lenin's ambiguous position toward the Italian revolutionary movements during the Biennio Rosso. On 28 October 1919, the Russian revolutionary sent to the West a letter entitled "To comrade Serrati and to all Italian communists", which Avanti! published in full on 6 December 1919, in which he wrote that he considered a social revolution in Italy "premature". Lenin wanted to congratulate Serrati personally on the success achieved by the socialist left in the elections. After offering his congratulations, the Bolshevik leader instructed PSI comrades "not to allow themselves to be provoked, and to avoid hasty and premature revolutionary uprisings".

Given the scope of these directives and their meaning, Angelica Balabanova, then secretary of the Communist International and tasked with translating Lenin's letter, returned the draft to the sender, noting that "these words could have been interpreted in a reformist sense", and asked Lenin "to clarify his thoughts better". Lenin, however, did not consider it necessary to change a single comma in his letter. In private correspondence, Lenin thus directed the maximalist leadership toward extreme caution. In 1920, the Russian leader would launch a denigratory campaign against the Italian "reformists", accusing them of "anaesthetizing the revolutionary will of the Italian people".

In reality, this campaign, orchestrated by the Comintern and by Zinov'ev himself, was directed against the PSI political area of the "unitary communists" and against Serrati, and aimed to strike and discredit Serrati in particular for his reluctance to split the PSI, believing that reformism had already been purged from the party at the 13th PSI Congress in 1912. Lenin branded Serrati as "counter-revolutionary", even though Lenin himself was reluctant to endorse a social revolution in Italy.

==== Split over the Comintern ====
The Comintern's demand to expel the reformists led to the formation of the Communist Party of Italy

The 17th Congress of the Italian Socialist Party was held at the Teatro Carlo Goldoni in Livorno from 15 to 21 January 1921, within the broader context of conflict within the international labour movement between the reformist current and the revolutionary one. The debate, which was followed with great interest both in Italy and abroad (Note: "The representatives of all the Italian newspapers and of the most important foreign ones have gathered here to follow the proceedings of the Congress", which "is unanimously considered the most important political event to have occurred in Italy since the armistice" (Sotgiu, p. 3, in the paragraph dated 14 January 1921 of his report as special correspondent in Livorno for Il Popolo romano).), focused on the request made by the Communist International to expel, from the parties adhering to it or intending to join it, the reformist component. Three main factions confronted each other at the congress: the right wing was that of "socialist concentration", close to Turati's reformist gradualism; at the centre stood much of the maximalists (the "unitary communists") of Serrati; on the left were Bordiga's "pure" communists. After days marked by a particularly turbulent climate, the congress recorded the split of the communist faction which, faced with the party majority's refusal to accept the Comintern's request and expel the reformists from the PSI, left the proceedings and gave rise to the Communist Party of Italy - Section of the Communist International.

==== Farewell to the reformists and the resumption of internal debate ====
The maximalist socialists who did not join the PCd'I in 1921 nevertheless expelled the right wing of their party after intense debates during the 19th Congress of the Italian Socialist Party, held in Rome from 1 to 4 October 1922. Filippo Turati, Claudio Treves, Giacomo Matteotti, Camillo Prampolini, Sandro Pertini and the other reformist exponents soon reorganized, founding the Unitary Socialist Party (PSU). Much of the "unitary communists" of the 17th Congress, as well as Serrati himself, would leave the Italian Socialist Party to join the Communist Party of Italy between then and 1924. This internal PSI dialectic was judged favourably by the Fascist regime. (Note: Suckert accused the maximalists of being "Mussolinians behind closed doors": he wrote in La conquista dello Stato of 30 September 1925, in Il tradimento dei massimalisti, declaring that "if the maximalist faction did not exist, it would be necessary to invent it. In practice it constitutes, for fascism, a solid guarantee of socialist impotence. It mitigates the demobourgeois constitutionalism of the unitarians, diminishes their collaborative and parliamentary possibilities, and at the same time prevents the communists from forming a mass in the ranks of workers and peasants".)

== Journalistic meaning ==
The term maximalism is today sometimes used, especially in the mass media and in journalism, by those outside the party or school of thought in question, often with an accusatory connotation, to indicate a generic political extremism tending to realize the maximum programme of a party or movement. In the same media usage, it may be contrasted with the term minimalism.

== See also ==
- Italian Socialist Party
- Communist Party of Italy
- Revolutionary socialism
- Luxemburgism
- Leninism
- Orthodox Marxism
- Centrism (Marxism)
- Democratic socialism
- International Revolutionary Marxist Centre
- Maximalist Italian Socialist Party (PSIm)
- Union of Socialists-Revolutionaries Maximalists

== Bibliography ==
- Sotgiu, Giuseppe (1945). La crisi socialista. Rome: Ercoli.
