= Revolutionary socialism =

Socialist political ideology stressing revolution

Revolutionary socialism is a political philosophy, doctrine, and tradition within socialism that stresses the idea that a social revolution is necessary to bring about structural changes in society. More specifically, it is the view that revolution is a necessary precondition for transitioning from a capitalist to a socialist mode of production. Revolution is not necessarily defined as a violent insurrection; it is defined as a seizure of political power by mass movements of the working class so that the state is directly controlled or abolished by the working class as opposed to the capitalist class and its interests.

Revolutionary socialists believe such a state of affairs is a precondition for establishing socialism and orthodox Marxists believe it is inevitable but not predetermined. Revolutionary socialism encompasses multiple political and social movements that may define "revolution" differently from one another. These include movements based on orthodox Marxist theory such as De Leonism, Impossibilism and Luxemburgism, as well as movements based on Leninism and the theory of vanguardist-led revolution such as Stalinism, Maoism, Marxism–Leninism and Trotskyism. Revolutionary socialism also includes other Marxist, Marxist-inspired and non-Marxist movements such as those found in democratic socialism, revolutionary syndicalism, anarchism, and social democracy (as defined by Karl Kautsky).

Revolutionary socialism is contrasted with reformist socialism, especially the reformist approach of modern social democracy and other evolutionary approaches to socialism. Revolutionary socialism is opposed to social movements that seek to gradually ameliorate capitalism's economic and social problems through political reform.

== History ==
=== Origins ===
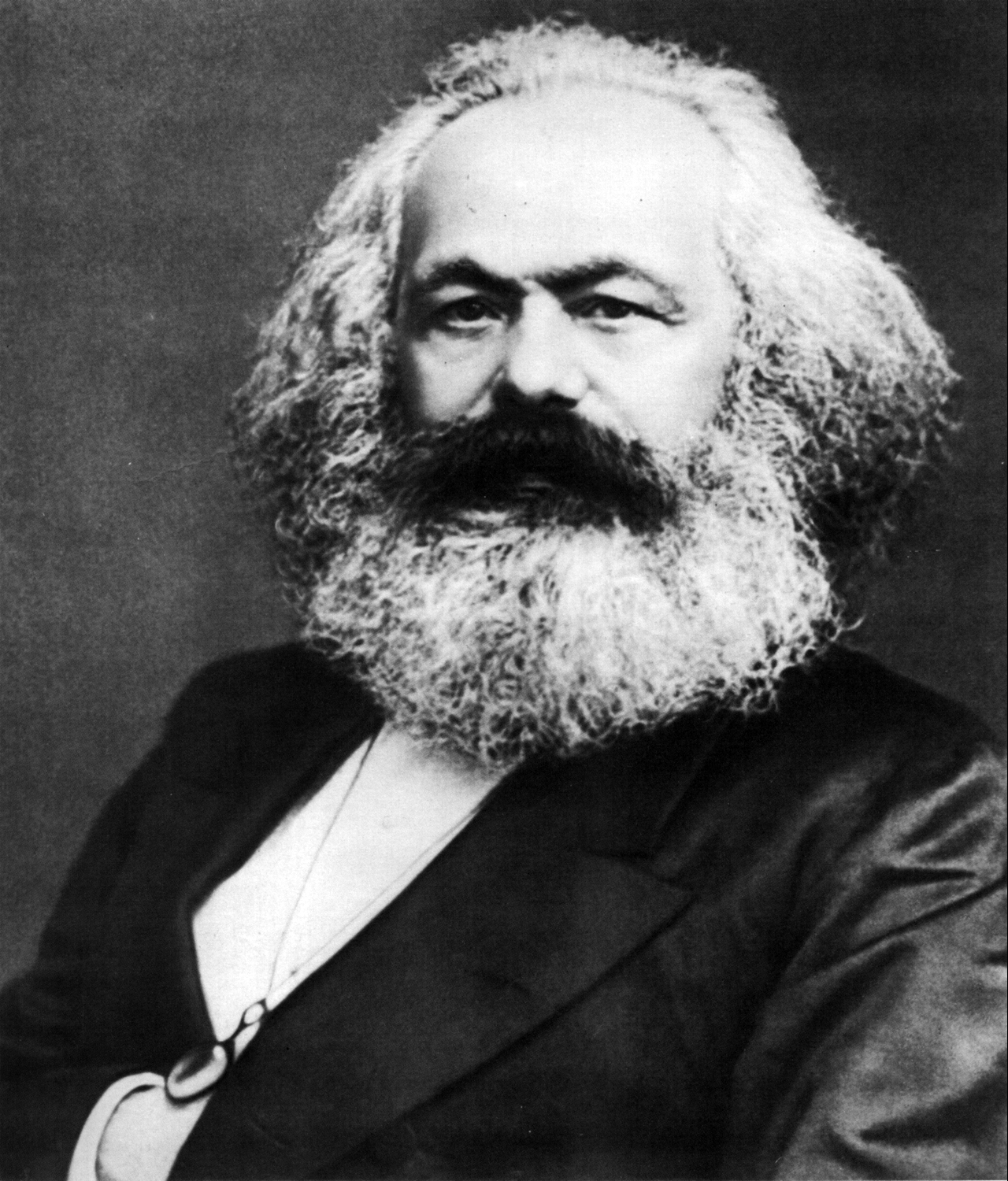
Portrait of Karl Marx in 1875

In The Communist Manifesto, Karl Marx and Friedrich Engels wrote:

The proletariat, the lowest stratum of our present society, cannot stir, cannot raise itself up, without the whole superincumbent strata of official society being sprung into the air. Though not in substance, yet in form, the struggle of the proletariat with the bourgeoisie is at first a national struggle. The proletariat of each country must, of course, first of all settle matters with its own bourgeoisie. In depicting the most general phases of the development of the proletariat, we traced the more or less veiled civil war, raging within existing society, up to the point where that war breaks out into open revolution, and where the violent overthrow of the bourgeoisie lays the foundation for the sway of the proletariat. [...] The Communists fight for the attainment of the immediate aims, for the enforcement of the momentary interests of the working class; [...] The Communists disdain to conceal their views and aims. They openly declare that their ends can be attained only by the forcible overthrow of all existing social conditions. Let the ruling classes tremble at a Communistic revolution.

Twenty-four years after The Communist Manifesto, first published in 1848, Marx and Engels admitted that in developed countries, "labour may attain its goal by peaceful means". Marxist scholar Adam Schaff argued that Marx, Engels, and Lenin had expressed such views "on many occasions". By contrast, the Blanquist view emphasised the overthrow by force of the ruling elite in government by an active minority of revolutionaries, who then proceeded to implement socialist change, disregarding the state of readiness of society as a whole and the mass of the population in particular for revolutionary change.

In 1875, the Social Democratic Party of Germany (SPD) published a somewhat reformist Gotha Program, which Marx attacked in Critique of the Gotha Program, where he reiterated the need for the dictatorship of the proletariat. The reformist viewpoint was introduced into Marxist thought by Eduard Bernstein, one of the leaders of the SPD. From 1896 to 1898, Bernstein published a series of articles entitled "Probleme des Sozialismus" ("Problems of Socialism"). These articles led to a debate on revisionism in the SPD and can be seen as the origins of a reformist trend within Marxism.

In 1900, Rosa Luxemburg wrote Social Reform or Revolution?, a polemic against Bernstein's position. The work of reforms, Luxemburg argued, could only be carried on "in the framework of the social form created by the last revolution". In order to advance society to socialism from the capitalist 'social form', a social revolution is necessary:

Bernstein, thundering against the conquest of political power as a theory of Blanquist violence, has the misfortune of labeling as a Blanquist error that which has always been the pivot and the motive force of human history. From the first appearance of class societies, having class struggle as the essential content of their history, the conquest of political power has been the aim of all rising classes. Here is the starting point and end of every historic period. [...] In modern times, we see it in the struggle of the bourgeoisie against feudalism.

In 1902, Vladimir Lenin attacked Bernstein's position in his What Is to Be Done? When Bernstein first put forward his ideas, the majority of the SPD rejected them. The 1899 congress of the SPD reaffirmed the Erfurt Program, as did the 1901 congress. The 1903 congress denounced "revisionist efforts".

=== World War I and Zimmerwald ===
On 4 August 1914, the SPD members of the Reichstag voted for the government's war budget, while the French and Belgian socialists publicly supported and joined their governments. The Zimmerwald Conference in September 1915, attended by Lenin and Leon Trotsky, saw the beginning of the end of the uneasy coexistence of revolutionary socialists and reformist socialists in the parties of the Second International. The conference adopted a proposal by Trotsky to avoid an immediate split with the Second International. Though initially opposed to it, Lenin voted for Trotsky's resolution to avoid a split among anti-war socialists.

In December 1915 and March 1916, eighteen Social Democratic representatives, the Haase-Ledebour Group, voted against war credits and were expelled from the Social Democratic Party. Liebknecht wrote Revolutionary Socialism in Germany in 1916, arguing that this group was not a revolutionary socialist group despite their refusal to vote for war credits, further defining in his view what was meant by a revolutionary socialist.

=== Russian Revolution and aftermath ===
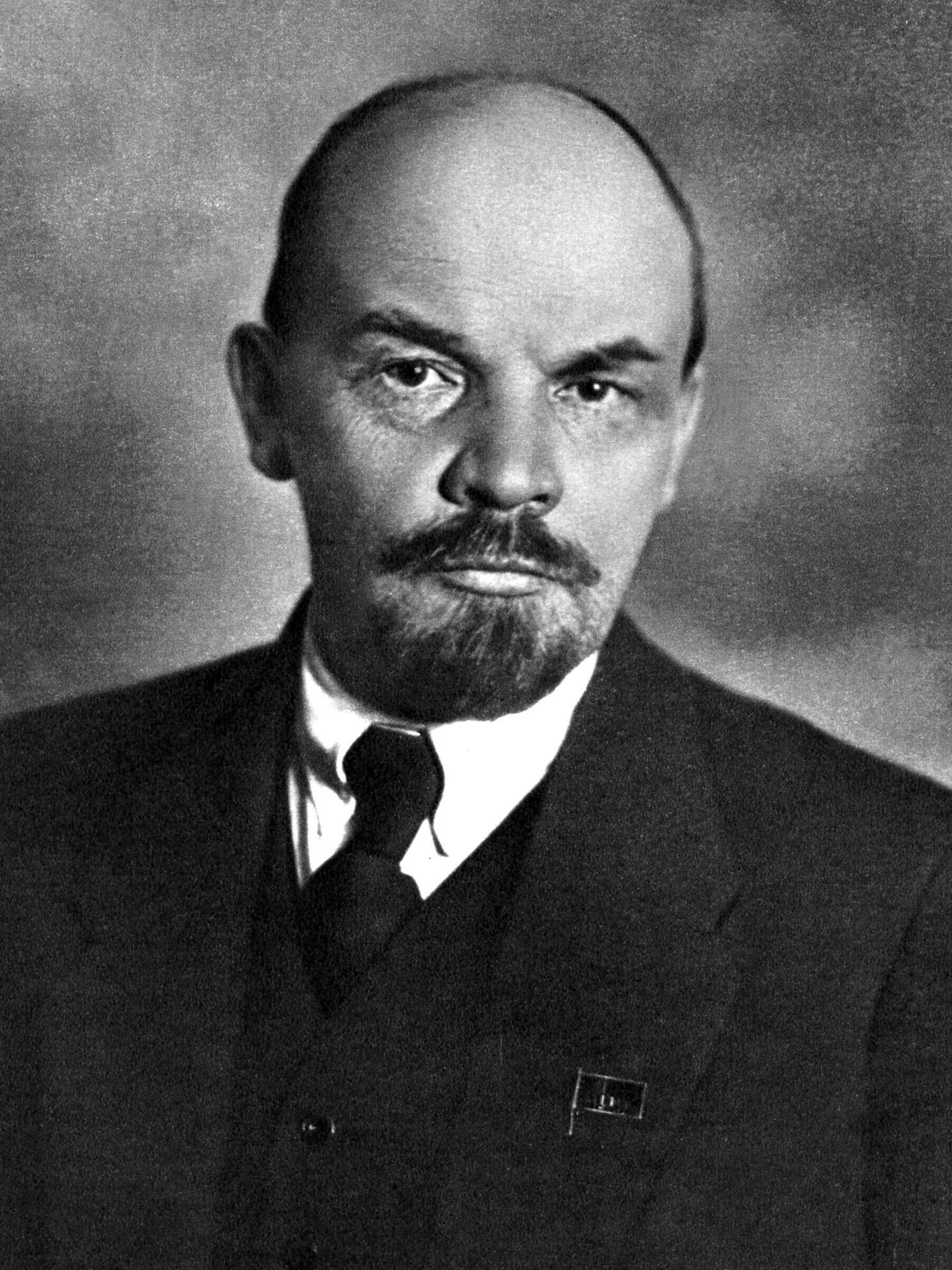
Vladimir Lenin, founder of the Soviet Union and the leader of the Bolshevik party.

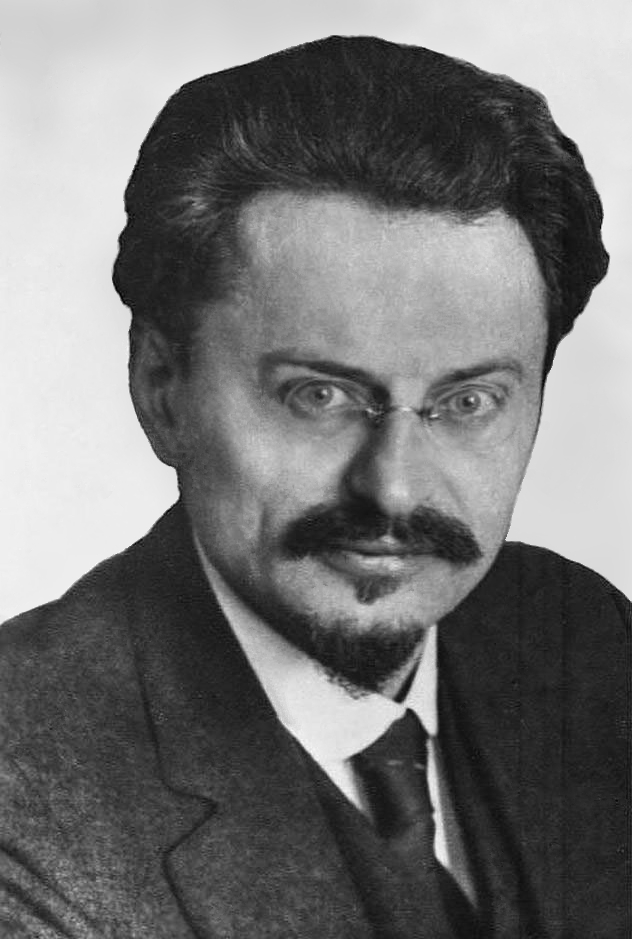
Leon Trotsky, founder of the Red Army and a key figure in the October Revolution.

Many revolutionary socialists argue that the Russian Revolution led by Vladimir Lenin followed the revolutionary socialist model of a revolutionary movement guided by a vanguard party. By contrast, the October Revolution is portrayed as a coup d'état or putsch along the lines of Blanquism.

Revolutionary socialists, particularly Trotskyists, argue that the Bolsheviks only seized power as the expression of the mass of workers and peasants, whose desires are brought into being by an organised force—the revolutionary party. Marxists such as Trotskyists argue that Lenin did not advocate seizing power until he felt that the majority of the population, represented in the soviets, demanded revolutionary change. They claim he waited until there was no longer support for the reformist government of Alexander Kerensky, established in the earlier revolution of February 1917. In the Lessons of October, Leon Trotsky wrote:

Lenin, after the experience of the reconnoiter, withdrew the slogan of the immediate overthrow of the Provisional Government. But he did not withdraw it for any set period of time, for so many weeks or months, but strictly in dependence upon how quickly the revolt of the masses against the conciliationists would grow.

For these Marxists, the fact that the Bolsheviks won a majority (in alliance with the Left Socialist-Revolutionaries) in the second all-Russian congress of Soviets—democratically elected bodies—which convened at the time of the October revolution, shows that they had the popular support of the masses of workers, peasants and soldiers, the vast majority of Russian society.

In his pamphlet Lessons of October, first published in 1924, Trotsky argued that military power lay in the hands of the Bolsheviks before the October Revolution was carried out, but this power was not used against the government until the Bolsheviks gained mass support.

The mass of soldiers began to be led by the Bolshevik party after July 1917 and followed only the orders of the Military Revolutionary Committee under the leadership of Trotsky in October, also termed the Revolutionary Military Committee in Lenin's collected works. Trotsky mobilized the Military Revolutionary Committee to seize power on the advent of the Second All-Russian Congress of Soviets of Workers' and Soldiers' Deputies, which began on 25 October 1917.

The Communist International (also known as the Third International) was founded following the October Revolution. This International became widely identified with communism but also defined itself in terms of revolutionary socialism. However, in 1938 Trotskyists formed the Fourth International because they thought that the Third International turned to Marxism–Leninism—this latter International became identified with revolutionary socialism. Luxemburgism is another revolutionary socialist tradition.

Emerging from the Communist International but critical of the post-1924 Soviet Union, the Trotskyist tradition in Western Europe and elsewhere uses the term "revolutionary socialism". In 1932, the first issue of the first Canadian Trotskyist newspaper, The Vanguard, published an editorial entitled "Revolutionary Socialism vs Reformism". Today, many Trotskyist groups advocate revolutionary socialism instead of reformism and consider themselves revolutionary socialists. The Committee for a Workers International states, "[w]e campaign for new workers' parties and for them to adopt a socialist programme. At the same time, the CWI builds support for the ideas of revolutionary socialism". In "The Case for Revolutionary Socialism", Alex Callinicos from the Socialist Workers Party in Britain argues in favour of it.

== Philosophy ==
Revolutionary socialist discourse has long debated the question of how the preordained revolution moment would originate, i.e., the extent to which revolt needs to be concertedly organized and by whom. Rosa Luxemburg, in particular, was known for her theory of revolutionary spontaneity. Critics argued that Luxemburg overstated the role of spontaneity and neglected the role of party organization.

== See also ==
- Anarchism
- Anarcho-communism
- Anarcho-syndicalism
- Authoritarian socialism
- Communism
- Criticism of capitalism
- Libertarian socialism
- Political revolution
