= The Socialist Crisis in France =

Work by Luxemburg on socialism and government

The Socialist Crisis in France (German: Die sozialistische Krise in Frankreich) is a work by Rosa Luxemburg that first appeared in 5 instalments in Die Neue Zeit in 1900/1901. It addressed the question of whether communists should participate in bourgeois governments.

== Background ==
The background to her articles was the decision of Alexandre Millerand to join the Waldeck-Rousseau government of France in 1899. Luxemburg described how communist participation in government produced fewer, rather than more, improvements for the proletariat, because it forced communists to sugarcoat the government's results. This weakened extra-parliamentary pressure on the government, which was the only means of securing real improvement.

Millerand joined the French cabinet following the highly divisive Dreyfus affair and the resurgence of militant far-right anti-semites and monarchists, who threatened to undermine the French Third Republic. A group of socialists, led by Jean Jaurès, played a crucial role in building a movement for the release of Dreyfus. In June 1899, the conservative politician Pierre Waldeck-Rousseau tried to restore stability by inviting Millerand, a socialist ally of Jaurès, to join his government, which also included Gaston, Marquis de Galliffet, who had commanded the slaughter of the workers of the Paris Commune in 1871 and who had advocated the continued imprisonment of Dreyfus.

Jaurès argued that having Millerand enter the government was necessary to “defend the republic” against the monarchists and far right. He also said that accepting a cabinet position represented a "transitional stage in the development of a capitalist society, a stage at which political rule is exercised jointly by the proletariat and the bourgeoisie, which is outwardly reflected in the participation of socialists in government".

The leaders of the French Workers' Party strongly opposed Millerand's move, but most of the non-Marxist left in France, led by Jaurès, supported it. When the Second International held its fifth congress in Paris in September 1900, it too welcomed the “ministerial” position. The International's leading theorist, Karl Kautsky, refused to criticize "principled ministerialism" and delegates rejected a resolution that would have banned participation in government.

== Ideas ==
For Luxemburg the questions involved in Millerand's decision were similar to the principles at stake in the debate she led within the German Social Democratic Party of Germany, where she opposed the revisionist positions of Eduard Bernstein in her 1900 pamphlet Social Reform or Revolution?. Luxemburg's position was straightforward:

“The character of Social Democracy [i.e. the Marxist political movement] in bourgeois society is essentially oppositional; it may come forward as a governmental party only on the ruins of the bourgeois state.”

Although Millerand was widely praised when he first joined the cabinet, he was soon associated with all of its reactionary actions - a massacre of striking workers in Martinique, and the granting an amnesty to the criminals who had ruined Dreyfus. Waldeck-Roysseau's foreign policy included expeditions against China and the Ottoman Empire. Luxemburg analysed the Millerand experience in great detail and drew from it broader tactical lessons for revolutionaries that went beyond the immediate circumstances of his presence in the French government.

“The participation of Millerand in the cabinet…, far from issuing in a new era of social reforms in France, means the end of the struggle of the working classes for social reforms before it had even started, that is, the suffocation of precisely that element which alone might instil a healthy modern life into ossified French social policy.”

“Thus does the ship of dogma-free socialism return to port from its first test run in the waters of practical politics with broken masts, a smashed rudder and corpses on board.”

== Reception ==
“Rosa Luxemburg’s examination of the Millerand experiment represents one of the most important writings in the whole of socialist literature. Her political logic, hammered out on the anvil of hard facts, closed every loophole of escape, and her final judgement has a universal validity against all attempts to serve the cause of socialism with the methods of capitalist state power.”

— Paul Frolich, Rosa Luxemburg - Her Life and Work
