= Erfurt Program =

1891 platform of the Social Democratic Party of Germany

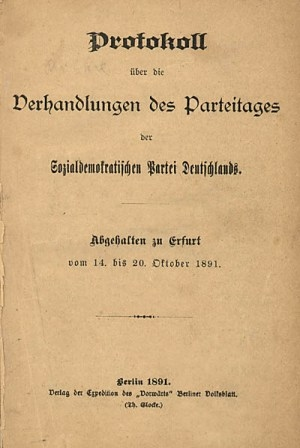
- Title page of the published minutes of the Erfurt Congress
- Original title: Erfurter Programm
- Ratified: 20 October 1891
- Location: Erfurt, German Empire
- Author(s): Karl Kautsky (theoretical section); Eduard Bernstein (tactical section)
- Signatories: Social Democratic Party of Germany
- Media type: Party platform
- Supersedes: Gotha Program (1875)
- Superseded by: Görlitz Program (1921)

The Erfurt Program (German: Erfurter Programm) was the party platform adopted by the Social Democratic Party of Germany (SPD) at its party congress in Erfurt in 1891. Drafted under the political leadership of August Bebel and Wilhelm Liebknecht, and with theorist Karl Kautsky as its principal author, the program officially committed the SPD to Marxism. It was the first and most prominent in a series of similar Marxist-inspired platforms adopted by socialist parties across Europe.

The program represented a stark break from its predecessor, the Gotha Program of 1875, by rejecting the Lassallean idea of achieving socialism through state aid. Instead, it declared the impending death of capitalism and the necessity of class struggle. The program was divided into two parts. The first, the "maximalist" section, outlined the unalterable principles of a socialist transformation based on Marxist theory. The second, "minimalist" section, detailed a series of practical legislative goals to be pursued within the existing framework of the German Empire.

This dual structure allowed the Erfurt Program to accommodate the competing ideological currents within the party. It provided a theoretical justification for long-term revolutionary goals while enabling a practical, reformist political strategy. This "Erfurt Synthesis" guided the SPD's policies through the final decade of the 19th century and the first two decades of the 20th. However, the internal contradictions between its revolutionary theory and its gradualist practice became increasingly apparent, particularly in the face of the rise of Revisionism on the right and a new revolutionary left after 1905. The synthesis ultimately broke down, culminating in the formal split of the party during World War I. The program was formally superseded by the Görlitz Program of 1921.

== Background ==
The unification of the German socialist movement in 1875 was achieved under the Gotha Program, a platform that was more heavily influenced by the ideas of Ferdinand Lassalle than by those of Karl Marx. The Gotha Program called for the "abolition of the iron law of wages through the cooperative control of collective labor" and pledged the party to work for a "free state" through "every legal means", without articulating a clear class character for the state or mentioning revolution.

The German socialist movement only became truly receptive to Marxism after Otto von Bismarck enacted the Anti-Socialist Laws in 1878. The twelve years of repression under these laws, which lasted until 1890, compelled the Socialists to operate illegally and fostered a growing revolutionary sentiment within the party and its working-class base. At its 1880 congress-in-exile in Wyden, Switzerland, the party unanimously voted to remove the phrase "by all legal means" from its program, and three years later at its Copenhagen congress, it declared itself to be a revolutionary party. During this period, the party's electoral support continued its irresistible surge, growing from 312,000 votes in the 1881 elections to 1,427,000 in the 1890 elections. This advance, in the face of legal persecution and electoral disappointments, fostered a sense of the historic invincibility of socialism among the party's theorists.

=== Party under the Anti-Socialist Laws ===
The period of illegality from 1878 to 1890, known in party histories as the "heroic epoch", was formative for the Social Democratic movement. Clandestine activities, such as the smuggling of the party newspaper Der Sozialdemokrat across the border, and the constant threat of arrest and imprisonment, gave the party a heightened sense of revolutionary identity. The experience of persecution also pushed the party's ideology in a more radical, Marxist direction. The party's Reichstag delegation (Fraktion) became its de facto leadership, as it was the only body that could operate with any degree of legality. A committee to revise the Gotha Program was formed at the 1887 party congress in St. Gallen, consisting of August Bebel, Wilhelm Liebknecht, and Ignaz Auer.

The party that emerged in 1890 was ideologically transformed. Where it had once been uncertain in its economic theories, it now had a firm commitment to Marxism. However, its commitment to its earlier democratic ideals had weakened. The experience of the Anti-Socialist Laws had estranged the socialists from the German liberal tradition, and the party developed an "ambivalent parliamentarism", participating in the parliamentary system while simultaneously rejecting its legitimacy. It needed a program that could reconcile the revolutionary fervour engendered by the years of persecution with the practical need for a reformist approach in a fundamentally non-revolutionary period. Marxist theory was seen as singularly appropriate for this task. The impetus for a new program was formally established at the party's 1890 congress in Halle, where Liebknecht reported that the press of time and events had prevented the drafting committee from fulfilling its charge. The congress voted unanimously for a new program to be presented at the next gathering.

To discredit the lingering Lassallean ideas, Friedrich Engels, a key intellectual leader for the German socialists, took the opportunity to publish Marx's Critique of the Gotha Programme, which had previously been withheld from the party membership. Karl Kautsky, the editor of the party's theoretical journal Die Neue Zeit, published the Critique in January 1891. This caused a "storm" within the party leadership, particularly upsetting Liebknecht and other members of the Reichstag delegation, but it successfully paved the way for the adoption of an explicitly Marxist program at the 1891 party congress in Erfurt.

== Drafting and adoption ==
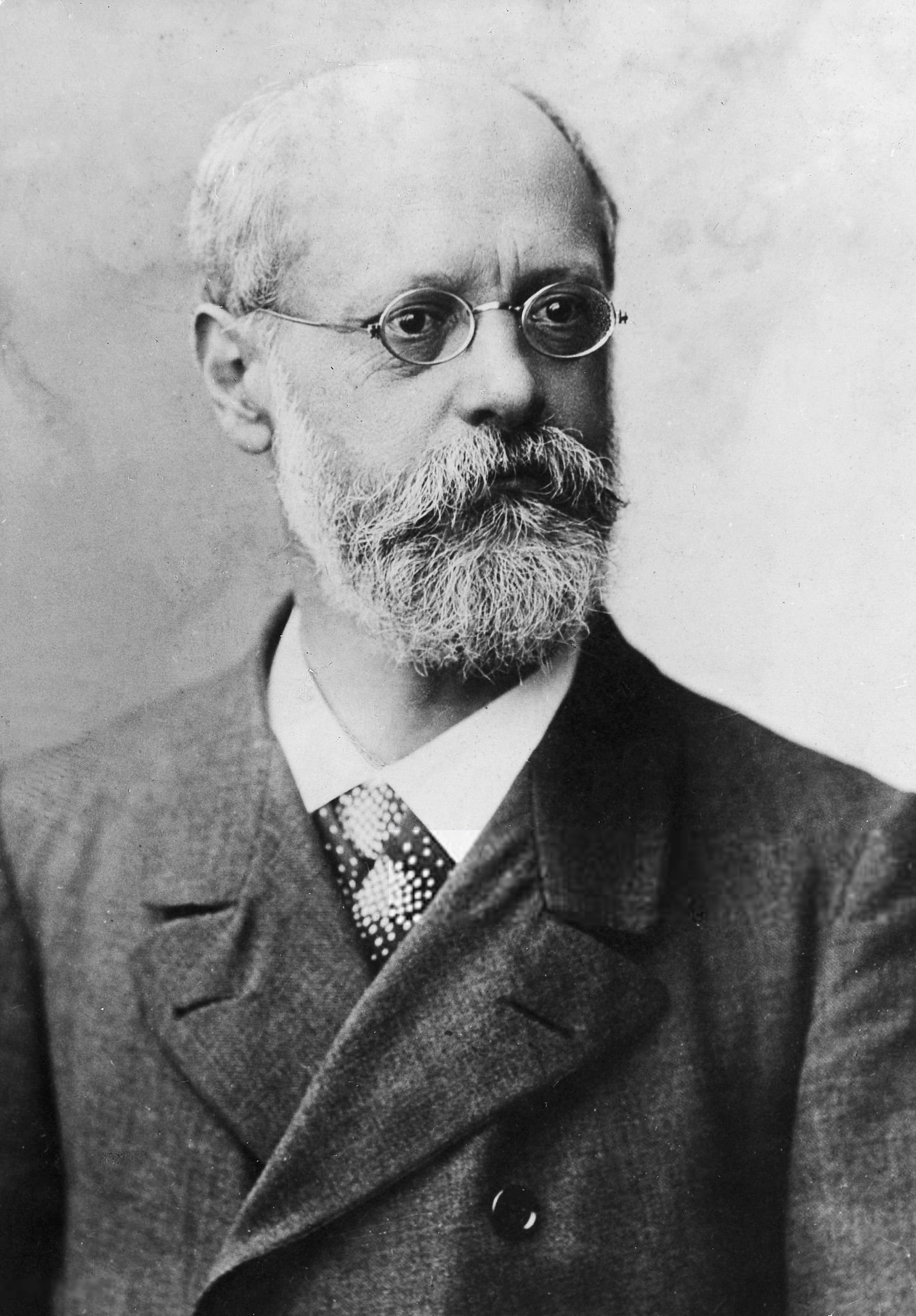
Karl Kautsky, the program's principal architect

The principal architect of the new program was Kautsky, who had joined the German Social Democratic movement in the early 1880s and founded Die Neue Zeit in 1883. He quickly became the party's leading intellectual figure, skilled in using dialectical thinking to reconcile antagonistic tendencies within the movement. The Erfurt Program was the first of several occasions where Kautsky acted as the primary theorist who could craft a synthesis that balanced the party's various factions. This intellectual shift reflected a generational change in the party's Marxist leadership, moving from figures like Liebknecht, whose reputation was based on his personal acquaintance with Marx and Engels, to a new generation of theorists like Kautsky and Bernstein who had developed their Marxism through dedicated study.

The Erfurt congress was held from 14 to 20 October 1891. A twenty-one-member commission was elected to reconcile two main proposals: one submitted by Kautsky and another drafted by Liebknecht on behalf of the party's central committee. At the commission's first meeting, Kautsky's shorter and more explicitly Marxist draft was accepted as the working basis by a vote of seventeen to four, a move that offended Liebknecht. Bebel, who ensured Kautsky's draft was accepted, also pressed for several changes. He was unsuccessful in his attempt to include the phrase "one reactionary mass" to describe all other political parties, but he did manage to add a clause calling for the free administration of justice. The final adopted program combined Kautsky's theoretical section with a practical, tactical section written by Eduard Bernstein. The program was formally adopted on 20 October 1891.

=== The Jungen opposition ===
In the period immediately preceding the Erfurt congress, a radical faction known as the Jungen (the Young Ones) emerged within the party. Centred in Berlin and led by a group of young intellectuals including Max Schippel and Bruno Wille, the Jungen represented a left-wing opposition to the established party leadership. They accused the party's leaders of "petty-bourgeois parliamentarism" and of having abandoned the revolutionary principles of the movement.

The Jungen drew inspiration from the anti-parliamentarian rhetoric of the early socialist movement, particularly Liebknecht's 1869 speech, but their critique lacked a firm basis in democratic principles. Their challenge reached its peak in 1890, with a series of public debates and newspaper articles attacking the party's leadership. However, the Jungen were decisively defeated by the party leadership under Bebel, who successfully rallied the party's base against them. Engels himself intervened in the dispute, publicly denouncing the Jungen for their "convulsively distorted 'Marxism'". The defeat of the Jungen opposition solidified the authority of the party's established leadership and its ambivalent approach to parliamentarism, paving the way for the adoption of the Erfurt Program.

== Content and ideology ==
The Erfurt Program's core was a synthesis designed for a non-revolutionary period, balancing the ideal of a complete societal transformation with the practical, day-to-day political and economic interests of the working class. It was a compromise that could simultaneously tell revolutionaries to be patient, as history was on their side, while instructing reformists that pursuing immediate gains was their first task, so long as they did not lose sight of the final goal. This "Erfurt Synthesis" was structured into two distinct parts: a theoretical, or "maximalist", section and a practical, or "minimalist", section.

=== Part I: Maximalist principles ===
The first part of the program, inspired by The Communist Manifesto and Das Kapital, articulated the party's long-term revolutionary principles. It drew a bleak picture of capitalist society, arguing that the economic development of bourgeois society necessarily led to the ruin of small-scale production and the expansion of capitalist monopolies. The program predicted that while workers' productivity was increasing, the growth of monopolies was robbing them of the fruits of their labor, leading to "mounting insecurity, misery, pressure, subordination, debasement and exploitation" for the proletariat and the declining middle class.

Economic crises were predicted to become increasingly severe, leading to an "ever more bitter" class struggle between the bourgeoisie and the proletariat. The program posited that this revolutionary process was guaranteed by historical necessity, as its unfolding was an essential feature of the capitalist mode of production itself. According to the program, the only solution to these problems was the "transformation of capitalist private property in the means of production—land, mines, raw materials, machines, transportation—into social ownership". This transformation, it asserted, could only be "the work of the working class alone", as all other classes were bound to the principle of private property. The struggle was defined as a political one, as the ultimate goal could only be achieved through the acquisition of political power by the party, which had the task of giving the workers' class struggle a "conscious and united character".

=== Part II: Minimalist demands ===
The second part of the program outlined a series of immediate objectives to be pursued within the existing capitalist framework. These practical demands were divided into political and economic goals. The political goals, while extensive, notably did not include a demand for a republic, a decision made out of fear of government repression.

The political demands included:

- Universal, equal, and direct suffrage with a secret ballot for all citizens over twenty years of age, including women.
- A system of proportional representation.
- Direct legislation by the people through initiative and referendum.
- "Self-determination" and self-government in the Reich, states, and communities.
- Direct election of officials.
- A direct, graduated income tax.

The economic demands included:

- An eight-hour day.
- Extension of the social insurance system with working-class representation in its administration.
- Guarantees of the right to organize.
- Prohibition of child labor for those under fourteen years of age.

The program theorized that the link between these two parts—the revolutionary goal and the reformist practice—was the "historical necessity" inherent in capitalist development. As capitalism expanded, it would simultaneously isolate and depress the workers, thereby developing in them the consciousness of the need for socialism and the strength to achieve it.

== Reception and influence ==
The draft program was praised by Friedrich Engels for its improvements over its predecessor, the Gotha Program, specifically as regards its removal of "outmoded traditions," both "Lassallean and vulgar socialistic." At the same time, however, he critiqued its opportunist, non-Marxist views on the state, as expressed in a criticism he sent to Kautsky on 29 June 1891. He also privately characterized its list of practical demands as "philistine".

The Erfurt Program was a significant success for the SPD. It provided a coherent ideological framework that allowed the party to grow rapidly while navigating the political realities of the German Empire. Under this program, the SPD established a "tactic of pure opposition", using parliament primarily as a platform for agitation rather than as a legislative body. The party refused to vote for the national budget or participate in ceremonies like the Hoch to the Kaiser.

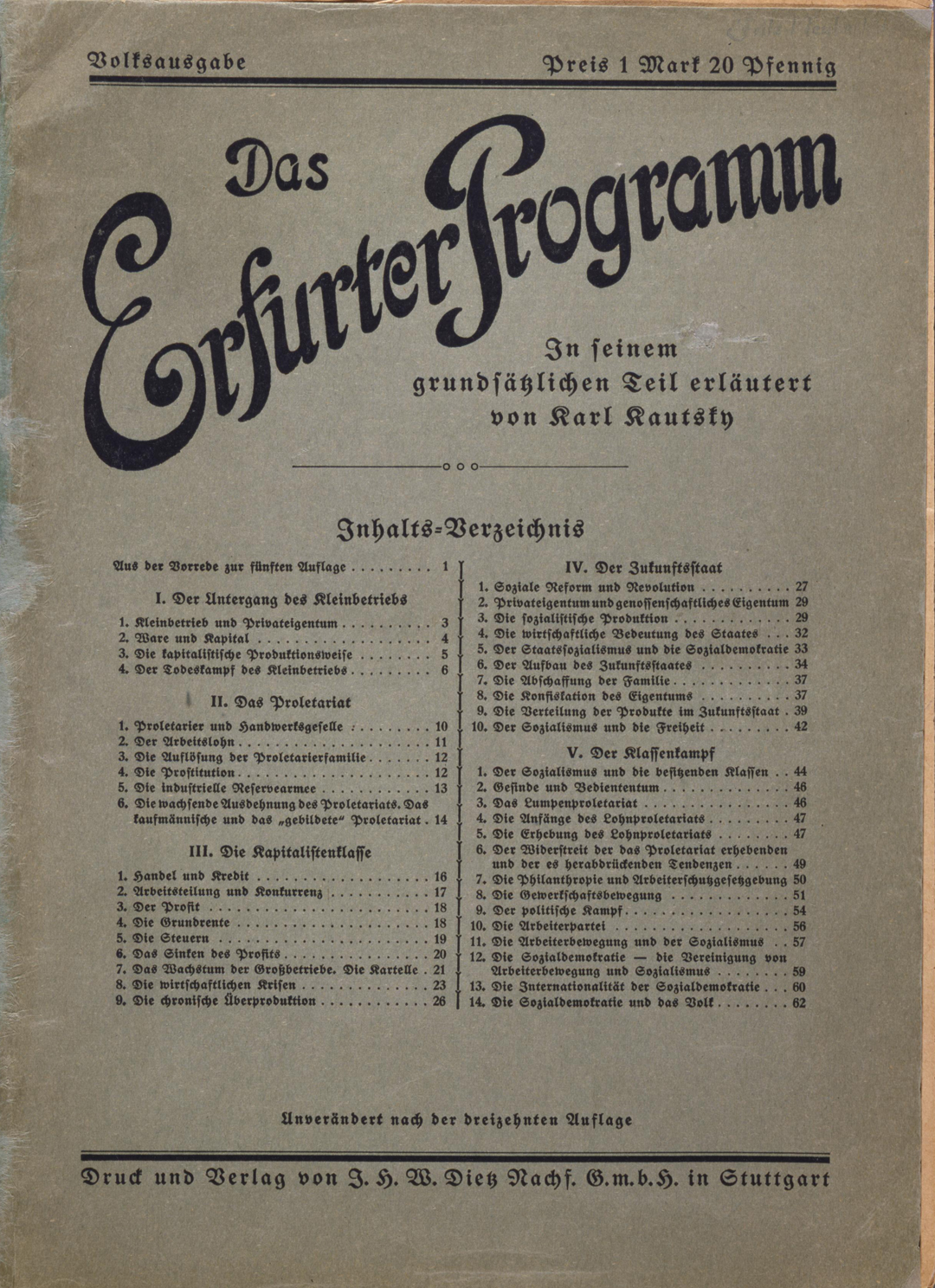
Cover of a 1904 pamphlet version of The Class Struggle (Das Erfurter Programm)

This strategy proved highly effective. The party's share of the vote in Reichstag elections grew steadily, from 19.7% in 1890 to 31.7% in 1903. This electoral success cemented the party's attachment to what became known as its "tried and true (altbewährte) tactic". After the congress, Kautsky was commissioned by the party to write the official commentary on the program, which was published in 1892 as The Class Struggle (Das Erfurter Programm). This work, Kautsky's first major publication without direct guidance from Engels, became his most famous and widely translated book, establishing him as the preeminent theorist of the Second International. Kautsky's commentary, viewed by the socialist parties of the Second International as a "sort of new Manifesto", confidently asserted that "Capitalist society has failed. Its dissolution is now only a matter of time; incessant economic development leads by natural necessity to the bankruptcy of the capitalist mode of production." The program's influence was profound; in 1899, Vladimir Lenin wrote: "We are not in the least afraid to say that we want to imitate the Erfurt Program: there is nothing bad in imitating what is good".

== Challenges and breakdown ==
The Erfurt Synthesis was stable as long as two conditions held: the German state continued to treat the working class as a pariah group, and the expanding capitalist economy provided enough material benefits to prevent the workers from being driven to revolt. It began to face serious challenges in the late 1890s and particularly after 1905, as the political and economic context in Germany shifted.

=== Revisionism and challenge from the right ===
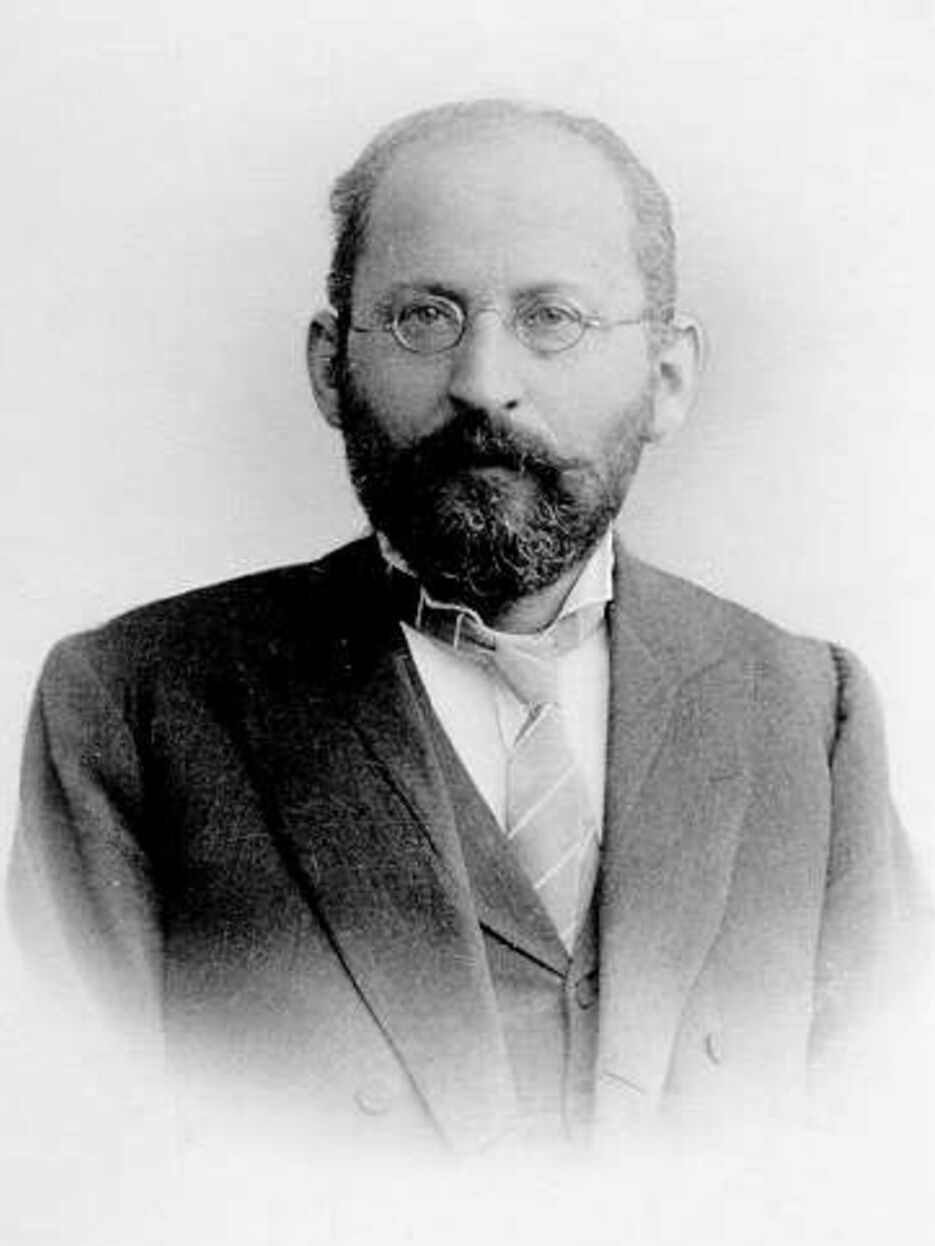
Eduard Bernstein

The unprecedented prosperity and rising real wages of the late 1890s began to undermine the Erfurt Program's core prediction of ever-increasing misery for the proletariat. This gave rise to Revisionism, a theoretical challenge articulated by Eduard Bernstein. Bernstein argued that capitalism was not heading for an imminent collapse but was, in fact, developing a capacity for adjustment and a more equitable distribution of wealth. He challenged the party to abandon its revolutionary rhetoric and to embrace a fully reformist, democratic-socialist path.

In southern Germany, where class lines were less sharply drawn, a reformist wing of the party had already emerged. They challenged the Erfurt Program's thesis that the peasantry was doomed and advocated for policies to protect small agricultural holdings, a direct contradiction of the program's precept that the SPD was a party of the proletariat. At the 1895 Breslau congress, this "agrarian question" led to a full-scale debate over a proposal to add a peasant plank to the Erfurt Program. While Bebel argued for the commission's report, Kautsky and Clara Zetkin led the opposition, which successfully defeated the proposal by a vote of 158 to 63, preserving the party's official proletarian purity.

The party's right wing, including Bernstein and the southern reformists, thus attacked the revolutionary theory of the Erfurt Program in favor of its gradualist practice. The resistance to Revisionism was stiff, in part because the Erfurt Program's radical rhetoric captured the "enduring spirit of the heroic years" of struggle under the Anti-Socialist Laws, creating a powerful emotional attachment to hardline opposition.

=== Challenge from the left ===
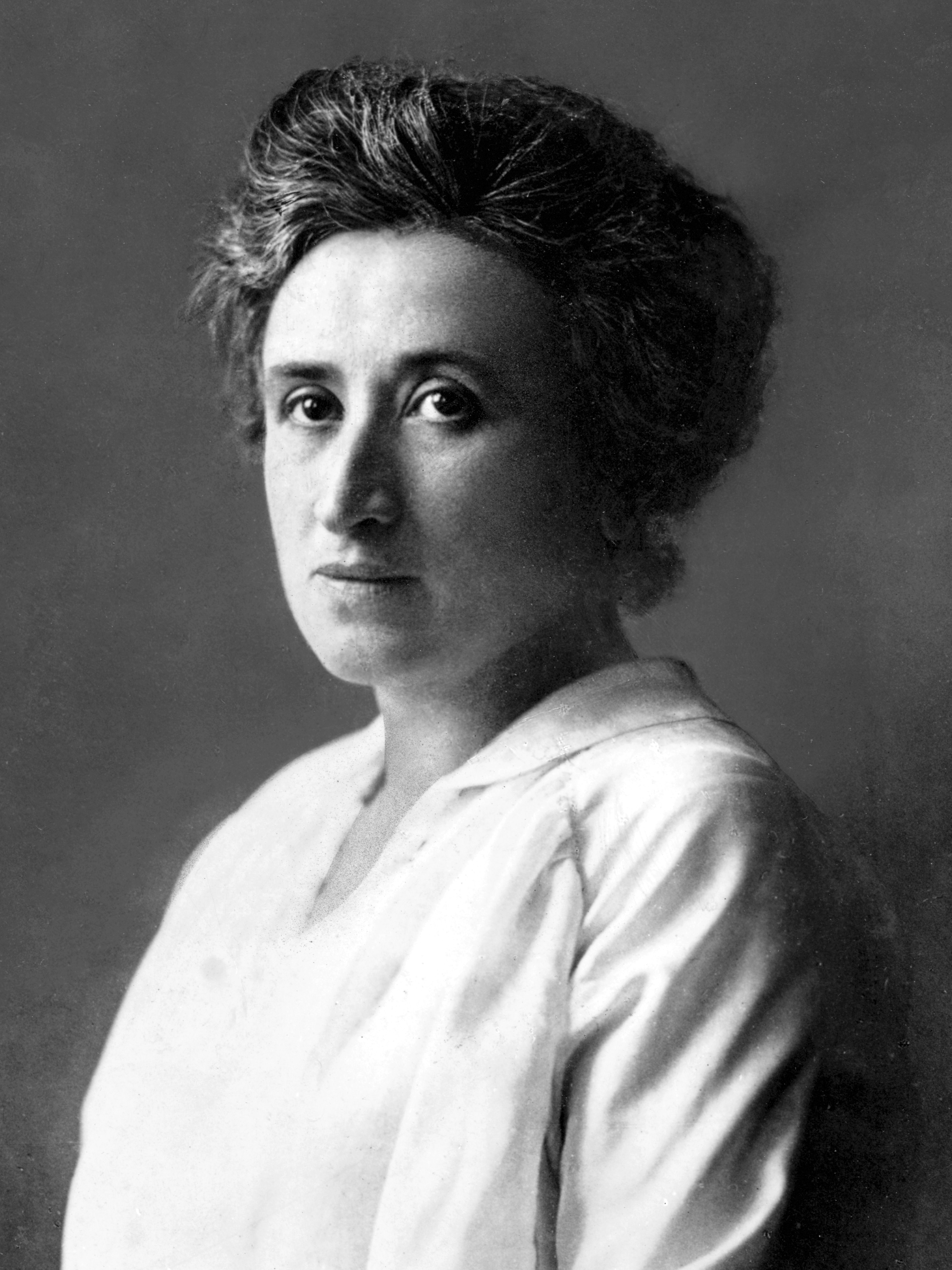
Rosa Luxemburg

A more fundamental challenge to the Erfurt Synthesis came from the left after 1905. The Revolution of 1905 in the Russian Empire and a period of intense domestic labor strife in Germany breathed new life into the party's revolutionary elements. Figures like Rosa Luxemburg, originally from Congress Poland and who had been present there during the revolution, began to challenge the party's traditional tactic of passive opposition that had grown out of the Erfurt Program. They argued that the time for "patience" was over and that the party must actively pursue a revolutionary course through tools like the mass strike. This "Revisionism of the left" represented a permanent challenge to the Erfurt Synthesis, attacking its gradualist practice in favor of its revolutionary theory.

== Legacy ==
The competing pressures from the reformist right and the revolutionary left pulled the Erfurt Program's internal contradictions apart. The synthesis of revolutionary theory and gradualist practice, which had held the party together for over two decades, ultimately proved untenable. The tensions culminated in the party's split during World War I, with the majority supporting the war effort in a reformist-nationalist turn, and the minority opposition clinging to the principles of proletarian internationalism. The party's radical rhetoric, derived from the Erfurt Program, was a key factor in its growth, attracting new voters who were drawn to its oppositional stance even if they were not ideologically sophisticated.

The adoption of the Erfurt Program, while appearing to settle the party's ideological direction, in fact "hid an equally important lack of certainty in the area of political tactics and theory". The party had gained a sense of certainty in its Marxist economic analysis but had lost its firm commitment to the democratic political ideals that had characterized the early socialist movement. In a historical irony, the well-articulated democratic goals of the Gotha era had posed as great a threat to the German Reich as the Marxism of the Erfurt Program did in 1890. The program contained an implicit distinction between a political revolution (the capture of state power) and a social revolution (the long-term transformation of the economy), a distinction Kautsky would only make explicit decades later in response to the Russian Revolution.

When the anti-war opposition formed the Independent Social Democratic Party of Germany (USPD) in 1917, it readopted the Erfurt Program as its platform. However, in the context of war and approaching revolution, the program was no longer suitable. It had been designed for a period in which the state was stable and the masses, while discontented, were not actively revolutionary. The legacy of the Erfurt Program was thus the schism in German socialism and the creation of a "centrist" ideological position, embodied by figures like Kautsky, who were ultimately trapped between the two magnets of reform and revolution.

== See also ==
- Frankfurt Declaration
- Transitional demand
