= Minimum programme =

Practice in Marxist politics

In Marxist practice, a minimum programme consists of a series of demands for immediate reforms and, in far fewer and less orthodox cases, also consists of a series of political demands which, taken as a whole, realise key democratic-republican measures enacted by the Paris Commune and thus culminate in the strictly political dictatorship of the proletariat.

One of the first examples of a minimum programme is in the 1880 programme drawn up for the French Workers' Party by Jules Guesde with Paul Lafargue, Friedrich Engels and Karl Marx. The introductory Preamble, also known as the "maximum section", was given to Guesde by Marx and concludes with the following paragraph (according to the Penguin translation from the German in MEW)

The French socialist workers, who have set themselves in the economic arena the goal of the return of all means of production to collective ownership, have decided, as the means of organisation and struggle, to enter the elections with the following minimum programme.

This programme was adopted at the Le Havre conference of the Party in November 1880 against the opposition of the possibilists like Paul Brousse and Benoit Malon and became known as the "minimum programme". Engels recommended the economic part of the minimum section to the SPD drafters of the Erfurt programme.

It is through later interpretations of the Erfurt Programme that the orthodox concept of a minimum programme becomes widespread and later mirrored by much of the Socialist International. The minimum is contrasted with a maximum programme, which will achieve socialism. In the short term, parties were to pursue only the minimum programme of achievable demands, which would improve workers' lives until the inevitable collapse of capitalism. Other groups believed that the achievement of a minimum programme enabling them to become mass parties and pursue their maximum programme.

Within the orthodox framework, the Communist International developed the alternative idea of a transitional programme, seeing the minimum/maximum division as leaving democratic socialist parties always campaigning only for their minimum programme and not clearly planning a route to achieve their maximum programme.
