= Social Reform or Revolution? =

Political philosophy pamphlet by Rosa Luxemburg

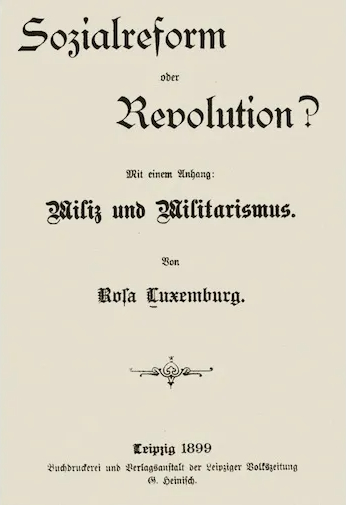
- Author: Rosa Luxemburg
- Original title: Sozialreform oder Revolution?
- Language: German
- Genre: Political philosophy
- Publication date: 1898–99 (as a series of articles); 1899 (as a pamphlet); 1908 (revised second edition)
- Publication place: German Empire
- Media type: Print

Social Reform or Revolution? (German: Sozialreform oder Revolution?) is an 1899 pamphlet by Polish-German Marxist theorist Rosa Luxemburg. Luxemburg argues that trade unions, reformist political parties and the expansion of social democracy—while important to the proletariat's development of class consciousness—cannot create a socialist society as Eduard Bernstein, among others, argued. Instead, she argues from a historical materialist perspective that capitalism is economically unsustainable and will eventually collapse and that a revolution is necessary to transform capitalism into socialism. The pamphlet was heavily influential in revolutionary socialist circles and along with Luxemburg's other work an important precursor to left communist theory.

== Background ==
In 1878, Germany's chancellor Otto von Bismarck imposed anti-socialist laws. As a result, thousands were arrested and hundreds exiled, political newspapers were closed and all political activity except elections was made illegal. During this period, the Social Democratic Party of Germany (SPD) declared itself to be revolutionary and repudiated the parliamentary road to socialism. The SPD's platform gave expression to the concerns of the urban working class in Germany and its share of the vote grew from 312,000 in the 1881 federal elections to more than 1.4 million in the 1890 elections.

In 1890, anti-socialist laws were lifted and a wave of strikes and trade union militancy followed. Fearing that the strikes would "scare off" conservative members or that repression might return, SPD leaders renounced the more revolutionary aspects of their program. At the 1891 Erfurt Congress, the party program enshrined Marxism—and the overthrow of capitalism—as the "official" thinking of the SPD, but argued for practical tasks appropriate for a time when revolution was not on the immediate agenda. Leading German socialist Eduard Bernstein was one of the authors of the Erfurt Programme.

Polish-born socialist Rosa Luxemburg moved to Germany in 1898 as the debate over revolution was raging within the SPD. Revolutionary socialists argued that socialism can only be achieved through the self-emancipation of the working class through an act of revolution. On the other side were the reformists, or revisionists, who argued that capitalism had reached a stage in which it was no longer necessary to call for revolution, but that enough reforms could be put into place—more democratic rights, more social welfare programs and so on—that over time would transform capitalism into socialism.

Bernstein advocated for revisionism with a series of articles on the Problems of Socialism between 1896–1898 and later a book, Die Voraussetzungen des Sozialismus und die Aufgaben der Sozialdemokratie ("The Prerequisites for Socialism and the Tasks of Social Democracy"), published in 1899. The SPD leadership did not officially support or reject Bernstein's views. Revolutionary activist Alexander Parvus responded with a series of vehement criticisms in early 1898 that led the issue into open debate within the party.

== Writing ==
Leadership of the efforts by revolutionaries within the SPD to tackle Bernstein's views fell to Luxemburg. She responded to Bernstein with two series of articles in Leipziger Volkszeitung in September 1898 and April 1899, which were collected as Part I of Social Reform or Revolution in 1899. Part II consisted of a response to Bernstein's book. The two parts were first published together in 1908.

== Themes ==
While a detailed critique of the thinking of Eduard Bernstein it includes a short critique of marginalism and identifies credit and the stock market as things that will exacerbate capitalism's periodic crises—not, as Bernstein had argued, measures that gradually remove the tendency towards crisis.

Luxemburg pointed out that Bernstein was little more than a utopian if he believed that socialism could be reformed into existence, comparing his arguments to those of French utopian Charles Fourier. The importance of trade unions, she argued, is not that they could end bourgeois ownership of capital, but that they are the body by which workers come together and understand that they are part of a class. Through struggles for reforms, they realize their class power. Luxemburg likened union struggles to the "labor of Sisyphus"—the mythical figure who was condemned to push a stone up a hill over and over again. The same applied to reforms won through the ballot box.

In the end, Luxemburg concluded that Bernstein was not simply arguing for a "more realistic" way to socialism, but had thrown out the prospect of socialism:

That is why people who pronounce themselves in favour of the method of legislative reform in place and in contradistinction to the conquest of political power and social revolution, do not really choose a more tranquil, calmer and slower road to the same goal, but a different goal. Our program becomes not the realization of socialism, but the reform of capitalism; not the suppression of the wage labor system but the diminution of exploitation, that is, the suppression of the abuses of capitalism instead of suppression of capitalism itself.

Rather than diminish the importance of the struggle for reforms, Luxemburg argued that these struggles are central. "In a word", she wrote, "democracy is indispensable not because it renders superfluous the conquest of political power by the proletariat but because it renders this conquest of power both necessary and possible".

== Reception ==
The writing and publication of Social Reform or Revolution took place against the backdrop of party congresses in 1899, 1901 and 1903. Luxemburg's positions won out against Bernstein, with the SPD remaining committed to orthodox Marxism. Karl Kautsky supported Luxemburg's position, lending her views great weight both within Germany and internationally.
