= Reformism =

Political ideology advocating gradual change

Reformism is a political tendency advocating the reform of an existing system or institution—often a political or religious establishment—as opposed to its abolition and replacement via revolution. Within the socialist movement, reformism holds that gradual change through existing institutions can eventually lead to fundamental changes in a society's political and economic systems. Reformism as a political tendency and hypothesis of social change grew out of opposition to revolutionary socialism, which contends that revolutionary upheaval is a necessary precondition for the structural changes necessary to transform a capitalist system into a qualitatively different socialist system. Responding to a pejorative conception of reformism as non-transformational, philosopher André Gorz conceived of non-reformist reform in 1987 to prioritize human needs over capitalist needs.

As a political doctrine, centre-left reformism is distinguished from centre-right reformism, which instead aims to safeguard and permeate the status quo by preventing fundamental structural changes thereof. Leftist reformism posits that an accumulation of reforms can eventually lead to the emergence of entirely different economic and political systems than those of present-day capitalism and bureaucracy. Religious reformism has variously affected, for example, Judaism, Christianity, (Note: Not just in the shape of Calvinism's Reformed Church, but also due to the reforms of Martin Luther, John Wesley and sundry Christian thought-leaders of the Reformation and Catholic Counter-Reformation.) and Islam, sometimes occasioning heresies, sectarian schisms, and entirely new religious denominations.

== Types ==
There are two types of reformism. One has no intention of bringing about socialism or fundamental economic change to society and is used to oppose such structural changes. The other is based on the assumption that while reforms are not socialist in themselves, they can help rally supporters to the cause of revolution by popularizing the cause of socialism to the working class.

The debate on the ability of social democratic reformism to lead to a socialist transformation of society is over a century old. Reformism is criticized for being paradoxical as it seeks to overcome the existing economic system of capitalism while trying to improve the conditions of capitalism, thereby making it appear more tolerable to society. According to Rosa Luxemburg, capitalism is not overthrown, "but is on the contrary strengthened by the development of social reforms". In a similar vein, Stan Parker of the Socialist Party of Great Britain argues that reforms are a diversion of energy for socialists and are limited because they must adhere to the logic of capitalism.

French social theorist Andre Gorz criticized reformism by advocating a third alternative to reformism and social revolution that he called "non-reformist reforms", specifically focused on structural changes to capitalism as opposed to reforms to improve living conditions within capitalism or to prop it up through economic interventionism. Some reformists can originate from centre-right. For example, the historical Reform Party of Canada advocated structural changes to government to counter what they believed was the disenfranchisement of Western Canadians. Some social democratic parties, such as the aforementioned Social Democratic Party of Germany and the Canadian New Democratic Party, are still considered to be reformist and are seen as centre-left.

== Reformist socialism ==
The first modern socialists of the 19th century followed utopian socialism. Rather than advocating for revolution, thinkers such as Henri de Saint-Simon, Charles Fourier, and Robert Owen believed they could convince the governments and ruling classes in England and France to adopt their schemes through persuasion. Reformism has expressed itself in socialism through a willingness to challenge revolutionary tenets of Marxist orthodoxy and through objections to aspects of scientific socialism, being broadly labeled as reformist socialism or progressive socialism. 19th-century economist G. A. Kleene referred to progressive socialism as containing Eduard Bernstein's position against "'Old-School' Marxism". Reformist willingness to challenge scientific socialism, such as through critique to the law of increasing misery, has been historically connected to the concept of progressive socialism.

In 1875, the Social Democratic Party of Germany (SPD) adopted a Lassallist orientation in its Gotha Program, which proposed "every lawful means" on a way to a "socialist society" and was criticized by Karl Marx, who considered communist revolution a required step. One of the delegates to the SPD congress was Bernstein, who later expanded on the concept, proposing what he termed "evolutionary socialism". Bernstein’s "revisionism" was quickly targeted by revolutionary socialists. Rosa Luxemburg condemned Bernstein's evolutionary socialism in her 1900 essay Social Reform or Revolution? and the orthodox Marxist Karl Kautsky sharply criticized Bernstein’s framework in his 1909 work Road to Power. After Luxemburg died in the German Revolution, reformists in the SPD soon found themselves contending with the Bolsheviks and their satellite Communist parties for the support of intellectuals and the working class. In 1959, the Godesberg Program (signed at a party convention in Bad Godesberg in the West German capital of Bonn) marked the shift of the SPD from an orthodox Marxist program espousing an end to the capitalist system to a reformist one focused on social reform.

After Joseph Stalin consolidated power in the Soviet Union, the Comintern launched a campaign against the reformist movement by denouncing them as "social fascists." According to The God that Failed by Arthur Koestler, a former member of the Communist Party of Germany, the largest communist party in Western Europe in the interwar period, communists aligned with the Soviet Union continued to consider the SPD to be the real enemy in Germany even after the Nazi Party had gotten into power.

In Italy during the onslaught of Italian fascism, Carlo Rosselli broadly concurred with Bernstein's revisionist and reformist assessment of orthodox Marxism, endorsing the perspective that socialism ought to be the democratic successor of liberalism and emphasizing anti-fascism. Both Rosselli and Bernstein dismissed the rigorous historical materialism and deterministic perspective of class struggle intrinsic to traditional Marxism, instead endorsing a pragmatic, ethical, and political approach to social democracy within the framework of existing liberal-democratic institutions (which Rosselli worked into his framework of liberal socialism).

Reformism is not directly synonymous with gradualism. However, Fabianism in the United Kingdom, while not a direct parallel of the Marxist reformism associated with Bernstein and the German SPD, is noted as having "undoubtedly done much toward the permeation of public opinion with a progressive evolutionary socialism" and being a gradualist tendency within progressive socialism or reformist socialism. Reformism was applied to elements within the British Labour Party in the 1950s and subsequently on the party's right wing. Anthony Crosland wrote The Future of Socialism (1956) as a personal manifesto arguing for a reformulation of the term. For Crosland, the relevance of nationalization, or public ownership, for socialists was much reduced as a consequence of contemporary full employment, Keynesian management of the economy and reduced capitalist exploitation. After the third successive defeat of his party in the 1959 United Kingdim general election, Hugh Gaitskell attempted to reformulate the original wording of Clause IV in the party's constitution, but proved unsuccessful. Some of the younger followers of Gaitskell, principally Roy Jenkins, Bill Rodgers and Shirley Williams, left the Labour Party in 1981 to found the Social Democratic Party; however, the central objective of the Gaitskellites was eventually achieved by Tony Blair in his successful attempt to rewrite Clause IV in 1995. In the 21st century, progressive or reformist socialism may be associated with the left wing of social democracy, or the moderate or "mainstream" wing of democratic socialism, and liberal socialism.

== By country ==
=== Iran ===
The Reformists (Persian: اصلاح‌طلبان, romanized: Eslâh-Talabân) are an Islamic liberal political faction in Iran. Iran's "reform era" is sometimes said to have lasted from 1997 to 2005—the length of President Mohammad Khatami's two terms in office. The Council for Coordinating the Reforms Front is the main umbrella organization and coalition within the movement; however, there are reformist groups not aligned with the council, such as the Reformists Front. Masoud Pezeshkian, a reformist, was elected president following the 2024 Iranian presidential election, and was subsequently confirmed by Supreme Leader Ali Khamenei on 28 July.

=== South Korea ===
Centrist reformism (Korean: 중도개혁주의; Hanja: 中道改革主義; RR: Jungdogaehyeokjuui) is a South Korean political ideology. It is part of South Korea's centrist tradition.

In international standards, centrist reformism can be seen as conservative liberalism or liberal conservatism.

== See also ==
- Centrist Marxism
- Bourgeois socialism
- Communalism (Bookchin)
- Democratic socialism
- Ethical socialism
- Fabian Society
- Impossibilism
- Incrementalism
- Libertarian possibilism
- Opportunism
- Passive revolution
- Radicalism
- Possibilism (politics)
- Post-capitalism
- Reformism (historical)
- Remeliorism
- Reformist political parties (Japan)
- Revolutionary socialism
- Revisionism
- Social change
- Social liberalism
