= Possibilism (politics) =

Reformist wing of the French socialist movement

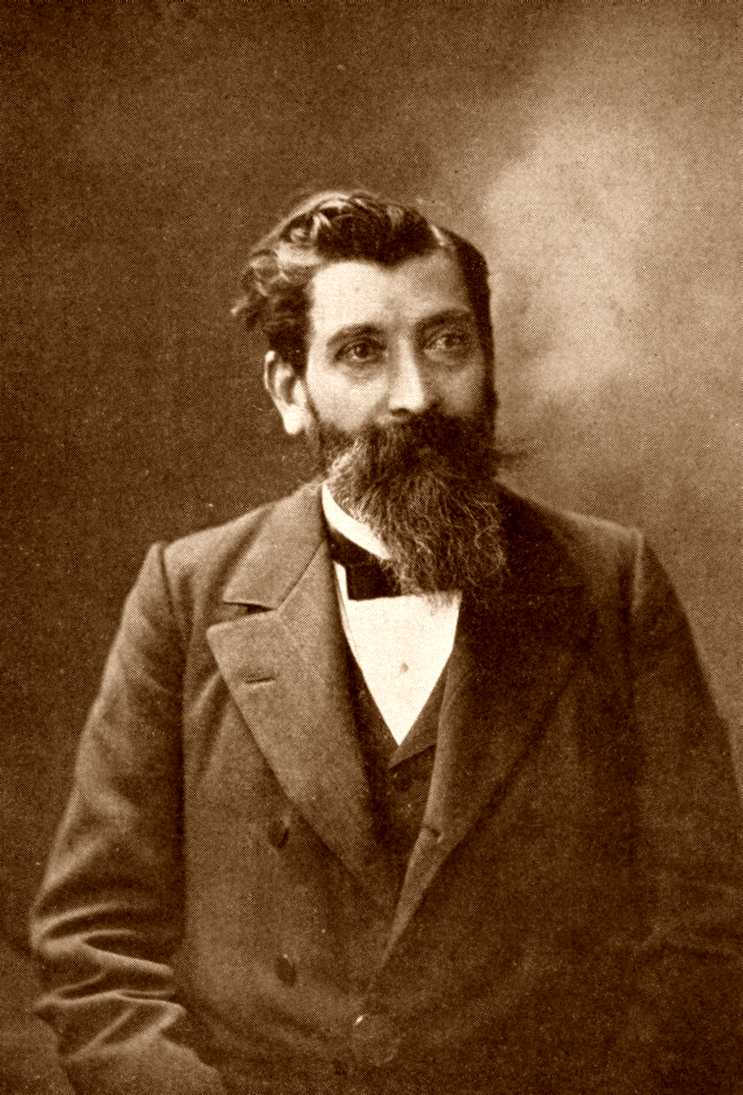
Paul Brousse

The Possibilists (French: Possibilistes), also called Broussists (French: Broussistes), were a faction of the French socialist movement of the late 19th century, led by Paul Brousse. Benoît Malon and others supported the faction although they did not always fully share its inspiring principles. It originated within the Federation of the Socialist Workers' Party of France (Fédération du parti des travailleurs socialistes de France), a Marxist-inspired organisation founded by Paul Lafargue, Jules Guesde, and others in Marseille in 1879.

Brousse opposed Marxist tactics and proclaimed the reformist principle of directing everyday political activity towards achieving the goals that were concretely possible time by time, while maintaining that socialists should keep always ready to jump at future revolutionary opportunities. Brousse wrote that "realistic politics requires the formation of a broad class party, acting by all means, weapons and votes; grouping all workers around their class interests, their little daily instincts, and leading them as quickly as possible to the ideal which is anarchist communism, that is to say a society in which public service will be generalized and the government abolished."

The Possibilists soon won a majority within the Federation, inducing the Marxists to split and found their new French Workers' Party (Parti ouvrier français, POF) in 1882. The Federation was initially renamed the Revolutionary Socialist Workers' Party and then commonly the Federation of the Socialist Workers of France (Fédération des travailleurs socialistes de France).

In 1889, as the Second International was founded, the Possibilists organized a rival congress in Paris on the same day, attracting 567 delegates from 14 countries. However, Possibilism quickly lost ground to the Second International, which became popular through its combination of reformist goals with a more ambitious revolutionary program for the longer term. According to Mike Taber, the Possibilist current quickly became "relegated to the status of a historical footnote" over the course of the following years. In 1902, the small political party of the Possibilists and other groups united in the French Socialist Party, which merged into the French Section of the Workers' International (Section française de l'Internationale ouvrière, SFIO) three years later.

== See also ==
- Libertarian possibilism
- Federation of the Socialist Workers of France 1879-1905
- French Section of the Workers' International 1905-1969
- French Socialist Party 1969-
- History of communism
- History of socialism
- History of the Left in France
- Minimum program
