= Frankfurt Declaration =

The Frankfurt Declaration is the general name that refers to the set of principles titled Aims and Tasks of Democratic Socialism issued on 3 July 1951 by the Socialist International in Frankfurt, West Germany. The Declaration condemned capitalism for placing the "rights of ownership before the rights of man", allowing economic inequality and its historical support of imperialism and fascism.

It declared that capitalism has coincided with "devastating crises and mass unemployment". It praised the development of the welfare state as challenging capitalism and declared its opposition to Bolshevik communism. It declared that socialism was an international movement that was plural in nature that required different approaches in different circumstances. However, the Declaration stated that true socialism could only be achieved through democracy. According to the Declaration, the economic goals of socialism include full employment, the welfare state and achievement of public ownership through a variety of means, including nationalization, creation of cooperatives to counter capitalist private enterprise and/or securing rights for trade unions.

The Declaration stated that economic and social planning did not necessarily have to be achieved in a centralized form, but it could also be achieved in decentralized forms. The Declaration denounced that all forms of discrimination whether economic, legal, or political must be abolished, including discrimination against women, races, regions and other social groups. The Declaration denounced all forms of colonialism and imperialism.

The Frankfurt Declaration was updated at the 18th Congress of the Socialist International in Stockholm in June 1989.

== Articles of principles of the Frankfurt Declaration ==
From the nineteenth century onwards, capitalism has developed immense productive forces. It has done so at the cost of excluding the great majority of citizens from influence over production. It put the rights of ownership before the rights of man. It created a new class of wage-earners without property or social rights. It sharpened the struggle between the classes.

Although the world contains resources which could be made to provide a decent life for everyone, capitalism has been incapable of satisfying the elementary needs of the world’s population. It proved unable to function without devastating crises and mass unemployment. It produced social insecurity and glaring contrasts between rich and poor. It resorted to imperialist expansion and colonial exploitation, thus making conflicts between nations and races more bitter. In some countries powerful capitalist groups helped the barbarism of the past to raise its head again in the form of Fascism and Nazism.

1. Socialism was born in Europe as a movement of protest against the diseases inherent in capitalist society. Because the wage-earners suffered most from capitalism, Socialism first developed as a movement of the wage-earners. Since then more and more citizens — professional and clerical workers, farmers and fishermen, craftsmen and retailers, artists and scientists — are coming to understand that Socialism appeals to all men who believe that the exploitation of man by man must be abolished.
2. Socialism aims to liberate the peoples from dependence on a minority which owns or controls the means of production. It aims to put economic power in the hands of the people as a whole, and to create a community in which free men work together as equals.
3. Socialism has become a major force in world affairs. It has passed from propaganda into practice. In some countries the foundations of a Socialist society have already been laid. Here the evils of capitalism are disappearing and the community has developed new vigour. The principles of Socialism are proving their worth in action.
4. In many countries uncontrolled capitalism is giving place to an economy in which state intervention and collective ownership limit the scope of private capitalists. More people are coming to recognise the need for planning. Social security, free trade unionism and industrial democracy are winning ground. This development is largely a result of long years of struggle by Socialists and trade unionists. Wherever Socialism is strong, important steps have been taken towards the creation of a new social order.
5. In recent years the peoples in the underdeveloped areas of the world have been finding Socialism a valuable aid in the struggle for national freedom and higher standards of life. Here different forms of democratic Socialism are evolving under the pressure of different circumstances. The main enemies of Socialism in these areas are parasitical exploitation by indigenous financial oligarchies and colonial exploitation by foreign capitalists. The Socialists fight for political and economic democracy, they seek to raise the standard of living for the masses through land reform and industrialisation, the extension of public ownership and the development of producers' and consumers' cooperatives.
6. Meanwhile, as Socialism advances throughout the world, new forces have arisen to threaten the movement towards freedom and social justice. Since the Bolshevik Revolution in Russia, Communism has split the International Labour Movement and has set back the realisation of Socialism in many countries for decades.
7. Communism falsely claims a share in the Socialist tradition. In fact it has distorted that tradition beyond recognition. It has built up a rigid theology which is incompatible with the critical spirit of Marxism.
8. Where Socialists aim to achieve freedom and justice by removing the exploitation which divides men under capitalism, Communists seek to sharpen those class divisions only in order to establish the dictatorship of a single party.
9. International Communism is the instrument of a new imperialism. Wherever it has achieved power it has destroyed freedom or the chance of gaining freedom. It is based on a militarist bureaucracy and a terrorist police. By producing glaring contrasts of wealth and privilege it has created a new class society. Forced labour plays an important part in its economic organisation.
10. Socialism is an international movement which does not demand a rigid uniformity of approach. Whether Socialists build their faith on Marxist or other methods of analysing society, whether they are inspired by religious or humanitarian principles, they all strive for the same goal — a system of social justice, better living, freedom and world peace.
11. The progress of science and technical skill has given man increased power either to improve his lot or to destroy himself. For this reason production cannot be left to the play of economic liberalism but must be planned systematically for human needs. Such planning must respect the rights of the individual personality. Socialism stands for freedom and planning in both national and international affairs.
12. The achievement of Socialism is not inevitable. It demands a personal contribution from all its followers. Unlike the totalitarian way it does not impose on the people a passive role. On the contrary, it cannot succeed without thorough-going and active participation by the people. It is democracy in its highest form.

== See also ==
- Social democracy
