= Das Göttliche =

1783 hymn by Johann Wolfgang von Goethe

Das Göttliche (The Divine) is a hymn in the Weimar Classicism style written by Johann Wolfgang von Goethe. It was composed in 1783, and first appeared in 1785 without Goethe's consent in the publication On the Teachings of Spinoza by Friedrich Heinrich Jacobi. The first version authorised by Goethe himself was published in 1789.

== Lyrics ==
"Das Göttliche"

Edel sei der Mensch,
Hilfreich und gut!
Denn das allein
Unterscheidet ihn
Von allen Wesen,
Die wir kennen.

Heil den unbekannten
Höhern Wesen,
Die wir ahnen!
Ihnen gleiche der Mensch!
Sein Beispiel lehr’ uns
Jene glauben.

Denn unfühlend
Ist die Natur:
Es leuchtet die Sonne
Über Bös’ und Gute,
Und dem Verbrecher
Glänzen, wie dem Besten
Der Mond und die Sterne.

Wind und Ströme,
Donner und Hagel
Rauschen ihren Weg
Und ergreifen
Vorüber eilend
Einen um den andern.

Auch so das Glück
Tappt unter die Menge,
Faßt bald des Knaben
Lockige Unschuld,
Bald auch den kahlen
Schuldigen Scheitel.

Nach ewigen, ehrnen,
Großen Gesetzen
Müssen wir alle
Unseres Daseins
Kreise vollenden.

Nur allein der Mensch
Vermag das Unmögliche:
Er unterscheidet,
Wählet und richtet;
Er kann dem Augenblick
Dauer verleihen.

Er allein darf
Den Guten lohnen,
Den Bösen strafen,
Heilen und retten,
Alles Irrende, Schweifende
Nützlich verbinden.

Und wir verehren
Die Unsterblichen,
Als wären sie Menschen,
Täten im Großen,
Was der Beste im Kleinen
Tut oder möchte.

Der edle Mensch
Sei hülfreich und gut!
Unermüdet schaff’ er
Das Nützliche, Rechte,
Sei uns ein Vorbild
Jener geahneten Wesen!

"The Divine"

Let man be noble,
Helpful and good!
Because that alone
Distinguishes him
From all beings
That we know.

Hail the unknown
Higher beings,
Of our belief!
That we should be like them!
Their examples teach us
That we might believe in them.

Because nature
Is insensitive:
The sun is shining
On bad and good,
The moon and the stars.
It shines on the evil
As on the best of us

The winds and the currents,
Thunder and hail
Make their way
And seize us
One by one.
As they hurry past

Fortune too
Reaches through the crowd
Grabs the curly-headed boy
In his innocence,
And then the bald one
Who is old and malevolent.

As the eternal
Great iron law requires
We must all
Complete the cycle
Of our existence.

Only we
Can do the impossible:
We differentiate,
We choose and judge;
He make the moment
Lasting.

He alone may
Reward the good
Punish the wicked,
Heal and redeem,
And bind to purpose
Everything wrong and lost.

And we worship
The immortals
As if they were people
Acting on a large scale,
What the best of us
Do or want in our small way.

Let the noble
Be helpful and good!
Tirelessly he shall work toward
What is useful and right,
Be to us an image
of those beings we sense!
