= Transitional demand =

Term in Marxist theory; describes the political aims of a socialist organization

In Marxist theory, a transitional demand either is a partial realisation of a maximum demand after revolution or an agitational demand made by a socialist organisation with the aim of linking the current situation to progress towards their goal of a socialist society.

== Development of transitional approach ==
Historically the parties adhering to the Second or Socialist International had adopted programmes that included both minimal demands, which it was believed could be satisfied by reform of the bourgeois state, and maximum demands which it was argued would see the end of capitalism and the beginning of a transition to communism. The left of the Socialist International came more and more to reject this separation of minimal and maximal demands and argued that socialism was imminent and that therefore the pursuit of minimal demands, reforms, was closing.

The use of transitional demands as part of a transitional programme was developed by the early Communist International and to some considerable degree was codified by the Second, Third and Fourth Congresses of the Comintern as "transitional slogans." However the Fifth and Sixth Congresses saw the Comintern returning to the division of its political demands between reformist, or minimal, and revolutionary, or maximum, demands. The key difference being that at the Fifth Congress both were seen as important but at the Sixth there was a marked tendency to reject any minimal demands as being operative in the short term.

Crucially, the Sixth Congress also saw the adoption of a programme by the Comintern which was more in line with maximum demands than with transitional slogans. A major debate took place at the Congress with regard to this with major contributions from Bukharin and Thalheimer the dissident German Communist who championed the concept.

Perhaps the most famous example of a transitional programme is The Death Agony of Capitalism and the Tasks of the Fourth International, adopted by the Fourth International and written by Leon Trotsky. Earlier examples include Lenin's The Impending Catastrophe and How to Avoid It.

== Comparison with other demands ==
Transitional demands differ from calls for reform (a minimum programme) in that they call for things that governments and corporations are unwilling or unable to offer, and therefore, any progress towards obtaining a transitional demand is likely to weaken capitalism and strengthen the hand of the working class.

Transitional demands differ from calls for revolution (a maximum programme) in that they call for primarily economic demands that could be achieved under capitalism. So "Rule by workers' councils" would not be a transitional demand, as it would imply the overthrow of capitalism. Examples of transitional demands would be "Employment for all" or "Housing for all," demands that sound reasonable to the average citizen, but are practically impossible for capitalism to deliver on. Trotsky held that, while socialists should not hide their programme, it was essential to plan a possible route to it.

The BBC television documentary Lefties, which aired in several parts in April 2006, featured interviews with people who were radicals in the 1970s and 1980s, in which the concept of transitional demands is described.

== Sources ==
- Strategy and Tactics of the Communist International: What are Transitional Slogans?
- Programme of the Communist International
