= Iron law of wages =

Proposed law of economics

The iron law of wages is a proposed law of economics that asserts that real wages always tend, in the long run, toward the minimum wage necessary to sustain the life of the worker. The theory was first named by Ferdinand Lassalle in the mid-nineteenth century. Karl Marx and Friedrich Engels attribute the doctrine to Lassalle (notably in Marx's 1875 Critique of the Gotha Program), the idea to Thomas Malthus's (1798) An Essay on the Principle of Population, and the terminology to Goethe's "great, eternal iron laws" in Das Göttliche.

It was coined in reference to the views of classical economists such as David Ricardo's law of rent, and the competing population theory of Thomas Malthus. It held that the market price of labor (which tends toward the minimum required for the subsistence of the laborers) would always, or almost always, reduce as the working population increased and vice versa. Ricardo believed that this happened only under particular conditions.

== Lassalle ==
According to Alexander Gray, Ferdinand Lassalle "gets the credit of having invented" the phrase the "iron law of wages", as Lassalle wrote about "das eiserne und grausame Gesetz" (the iron and cruel law).

According to Lassalle, wages cannot fall below subsistence wage level because without subsistence, laborers will be unable to work. However, competition among laborers for employment will drive wages down to this minimal level. This follows from Malthus' demographic theory, according to which population rises when wages are above the "subsistence wage" and falls when wages are below subsistence. Assuming the demand for labor to be a given monotonically decreasing function of the real wage rate, the theory then predicted that, in the long-run equilibrium of the system, labor supply (i.e. population) will rise or fall to the number of workers needed at the subsistence wage.

The justification for this was that when wages are higher, the supply of labor will increase relative to demand, creating an excess supply and thus depressing market real wages; when wages are lower, labor supply will fall, increasing market real wages. This would create a dynamic convergence towards a subsistence-wage equilibrium with constant population, in accordance with supply and demand theory.

As Ricardo noticed, this prediction would not come true as long as new investment, technology, or some other factor causes the demand for labor to increase faster than population: in that case, both real wages and population would increase over time. The demographic transition (a transition from high birth and death rates to low birth and death rates as a country industrializes) changed this dynamic in most of the developed world, leading to wages much higher than the subsistence wage. Even in countries which still have rapidly expanding populations, the need for skilled labor in certain occupations causes some wages to rise much faster than in others.

To answer the question of why wages might fall towards a subsistence level, Ricardo put forth the law of rent. Ricardo and Malthus debated this concept in a lengthy personal correspondence.

== Ricardo ==
The content of the iron law of wages has been attributed to economists writing earlier than Lassalle. For example, Antonella Stirati notes that Joseph Schumpeter claimed that Anne-Robert-Jacques Turgot first formulated the concept. Some (e.g., John Kenneth Galbraith) attribute the idea to David Ricardo. According to Terry Peach, economists interpreting Ricardo as having a more flexible view of wages include Haney (1924), J. R. Hicks (1973), Frank Knight (1935), Ramsay (1836), George Stigler (1952), and Paul Samuelson (1979). She sees Ricardo, for example, as being closer to the more flexible views of population characteristic of economists prior to Malthus. The theorist Henry George noticed that Ricardo's Law of Rent did not imply that a reduction of wages to subsistence is an immutable fact, but that it instead points the way towards reforms that could greatly increase real wages, such as a land value tax. Ricardo drew a distinction between a natural price and a market price. For Ricardo, the natural price of labor was the cost of maintaining the laborer. However, Ricardo believed that the market price of labor or the actual wages paid could exceed the natural wage level indefinitely due to countervailing economic tendencies:

Notwithstanding the tendency of wages to conform to their natural rate, their market rate may, in an improving society, for an indefinite period, be constantly above it; for no sooner may the impulse, which an increased capital gives to a new demand for labor, be obeyed, than another increase of capital may produce the same effect; and thus, if the increase of capital be gradual and constant, the demand for labor may give a continued stimulus to an increase of people...

Ricardo also claimed that the natural wage was not necessarily what was needed to physically sustain the laborer, but could be much higher depending on the "habits and customs" of a nation. He wrote:

An English laborer would consider his wages under their natural rate, and too scanty to support a family, if they enabled him to purchase no other food than potatoes, and to live in no better habitation than a mud cabin; yet these moderate demands of nature are often deemed sufficient in countries where 'man's life is cheap', and his wants easily satisfied.

== Criticism ==
There have been socialist critics of Lassalle and of the alleged iron law of wages both Marxist and anarchist. Karl Marx, argued that although there was a tendency for wages to fall to subsistence levels, there were also tendencies which worked in opposing directions. Marx criticized the Malthusian basis for the iron law of wages. According to Malthus, humanity is largely destined to live in poverty because an increase in productive capacity results in an increase in population. Marx criticized Lassalle for misunderstanding David Ricardo. Marx also noted that the foundation of what he called "modern political economy" needs, for the theory of value, only for wages to be a given magnitude. He did so in praising the physiocrats. The French anarchist and revolutionary syndicalist Émile Pouget also criticised the alleged iron law stating that “It isn’t even a law of rubber!". He argued, on a simply empirical basis, that England, the United States, and Australia had a higher pay rate and lower cost of basic necessities than France.

The vast majority of economists consider the traditionally formulated iron law of wages incorrect. At a theoretical level, it ignores productivity gains, which enable employers to pay higher wages while remaining profitable. The law also argues that higher living standards result in parents having an increased number of children while these factors are actually inversely correlated due to increased education and contraception usage in those with higher living standards. Additionally, the law effectively assumes that labour demand is largely fixed as population increases, whereas in reality a growing population also generally increases consumer demand, investment, and economic activity, similarly expanding labour demand.

In many countries, real wages and living standards have risen empirically since the industrial revolution, contradicting the law.

== See also ==
- Tendency of the rate of profit to fall
