= Critique of the Gotha Programme =

1875 work by Karl Marx

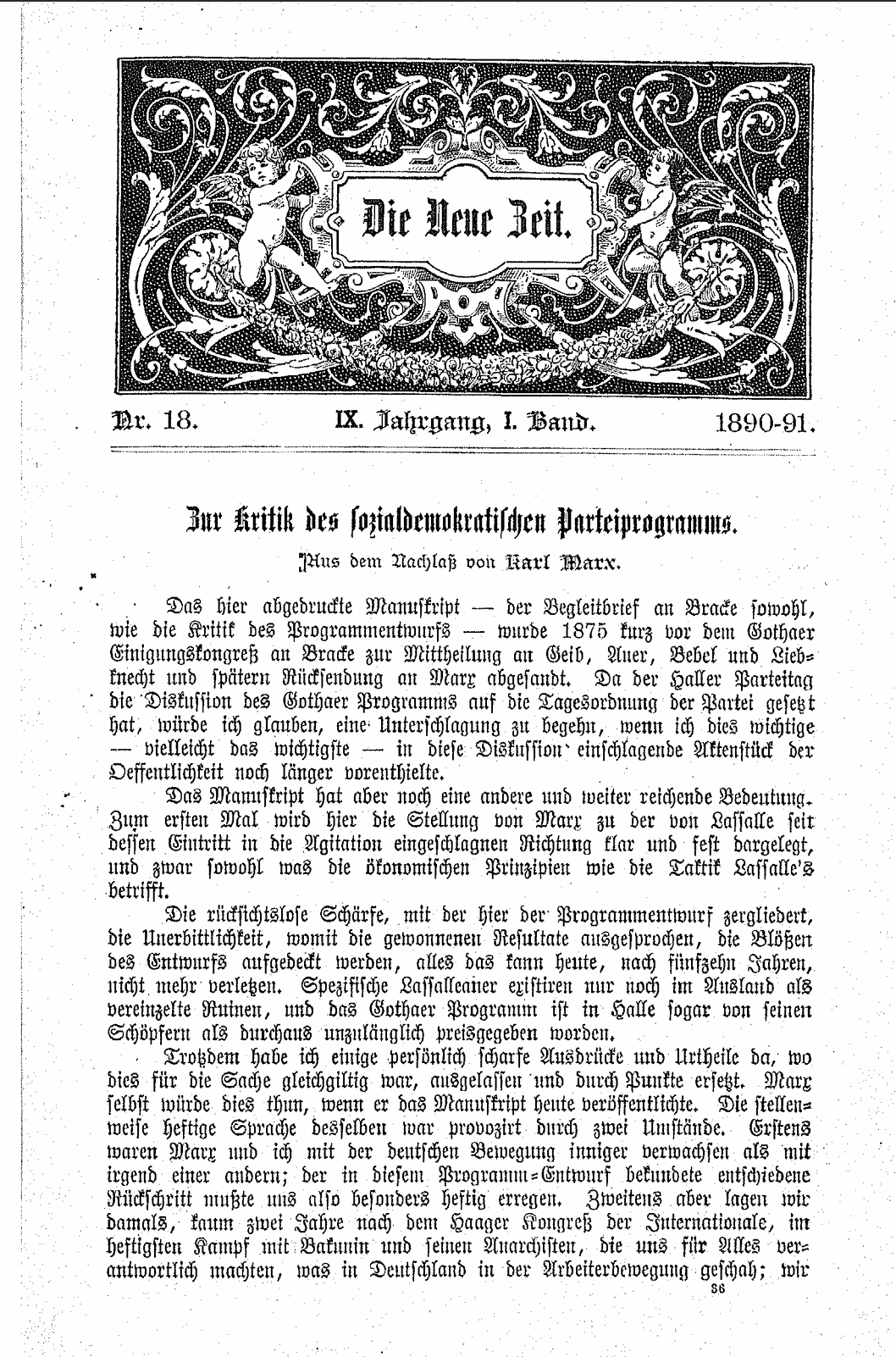
- First page, as published in Die Neue Zeit in 1891
- Author: Karl Marx
- Original title: Kritik des Gothaer Programms
- Language: German
- Subject: Gotha Programme
- Published: 1891
- Publisher: Die Neue Zeit
- Publication place: Stuttgart, German Empire
- The work was written in 1875 and published posthumously.

The Critique of the Gotha Programme (German: Kritik des Gothaer Programms) is a document written by Karl Marx in 1875 as a private communication to the leadership of the German Social Democratic Workers' Party (the "Eisenachers"). The critique was directed at the draft programme of the unified party that was to be created through a merger with the General German Workers' Association (the "Lassalleans") at a congress in the city of Gotha. Marx argued that the programme made significant and damaging concessions to the state-oriented socialism of Ferdinand Lassalle, whose ideas he considered opportunistic and insufficiently revolutionary.

The work is celebrated among Marxists for being one of Marx's most detailed pronouncements on programmatic matters. It offers his most extensive statements on the nature of a hypothetical future communist society, the strategy for achieving it, and the principles that would govern it. The Critique outlines the "two phases of communist society" as predicted by Marx: a lower phase where individuals receive goods equivalent to their labour contribution, and a higher phase in which society operates on the principle, "from each according to his ability, to each according to his needs". It also contains Marx's only sustained discussion of the "dictatorship of the proletariat" as the posited form of governance during the projected transition period between capitalism and communism.

The document was originally suppressed by the party leadership, who feared it would disrupt the unity congress, and was not published during Marx's lifetime. Friedrich Engels, who shared Marx's objections to the programme, published the Critique in 1891, as the newly formed Social Democratic Party of Germany (SPD) was drafting a new programme. Its publication was controversial within the party but helped to solidify its theoretical basis. The text became a foundational work for later Marxist thinkers, particularly Vladimir Lenin, whose book The State and Revolution is in large part an elaboration of the ideas in the Critique of the Gotha Programme.

== Background ==
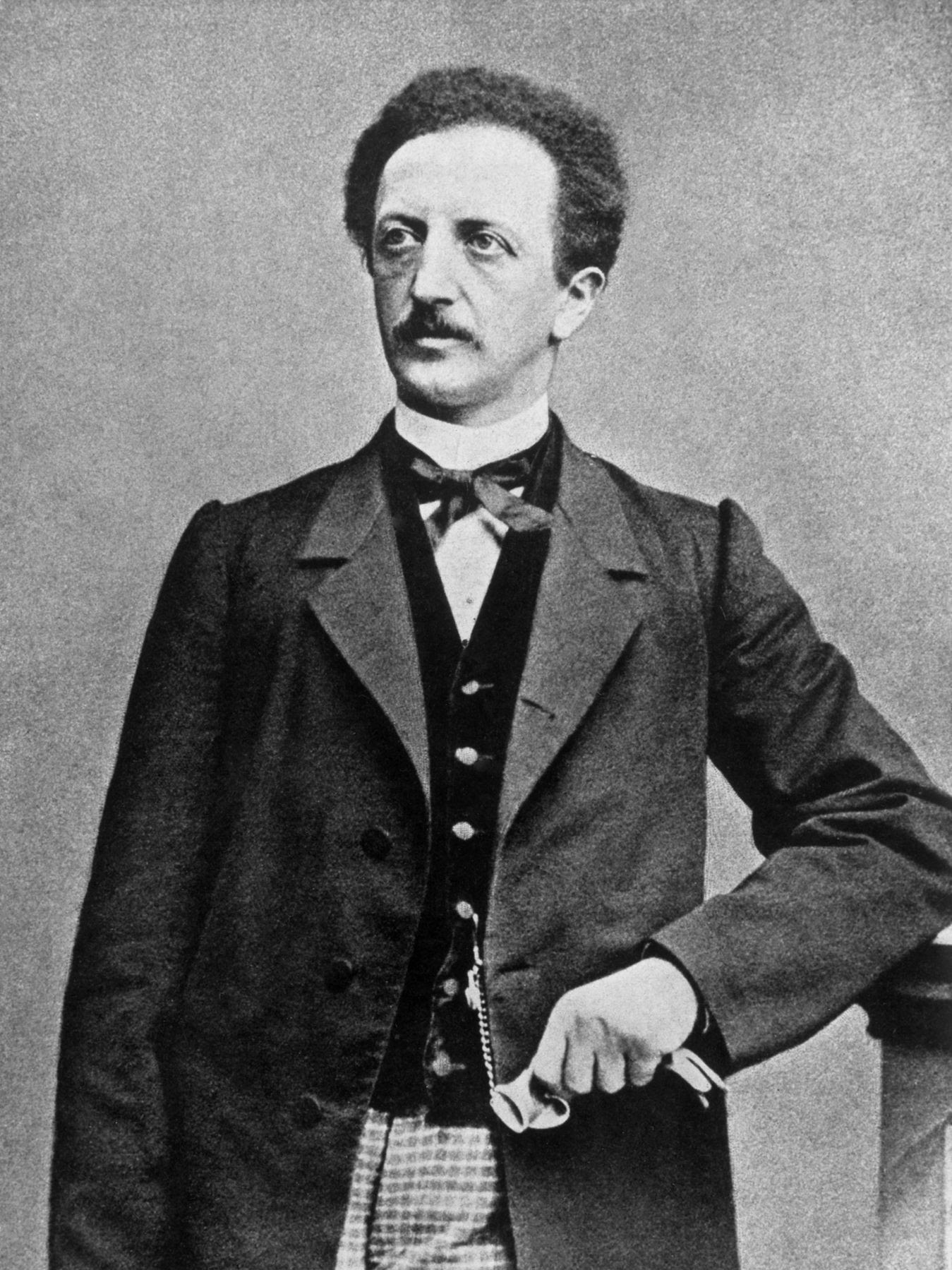
Ferdinand Lassalle, whose ideas Marx fiercely criticised in the Critique of the Gotha Programme

In May 1875, two German socialist parties, the Social Democratic Workers' Party ("Eisenachers") and the General German Workers' Association ("Lassalleans"), planned to unite at a congress in the city of Gotha. The Eisenach party, led by Wilhelm Liebknecht and August Bebel, was ideologically closer to Karl Marx and Friedrich Engels. The Lassallean wing, however, followed the ideas of the late Ferdinand Lassalle, who had died in 1864 and whose theories Marx viewed as opportunistic and insufficiently revolutionary. Marx and Engels rejected Lassalle's brand of socialism because they considered it insufficiently critical of capitalism and a money-based economy, and because they believed it was too focused on statist, reformist solutions to the social question rather than revolutionary transformation.

Karl Marx

Marx, living in London, received a copy of the draft programme for the unified party. He was, in his own words, "furious" at the document, which he saw as a betrayal of revolutionary principles and a capitulation to Lassalleanism. He advocated for a period of common action between the two groups without programmatic compromise, writing in a cover letter to the Eisenacher leadership that "every step of real movement is more important than a dozen programmes". He wrote the Critique in the form of marginal notes addressed to the Eisenach leaders to be circulated among them, threatening to "completely disassociate ourselves from said programme's principles" if it were adopted. To emphasize the theoretical stakes, he also sent copies of the recently published French edition of Das Kapital, which contained his most developed critique of capital.

Marx's primary objection was that the programme subordinated the class struggle to vague phrases about "fair distribution" and "equal rights", and that it relied on the state to establish socialism. For example, he expressed strong opposition to the opening declaration that "labour is the source of all wealth", arguing that nature was just as much a source of use value. He considered this a dangerous formulation because it implied that value production was a natural property of labour and thus a permanent condition of human life.

Despite Marx's objections, the programme was adopted with only minor changes at the Gotha Congress in late May. Marx chose not to make his denunciation public, in part because Otto von Bismarck had just jailed several leading Eisenachers, and he did not want to give aid to the party's enemies. The critique remained unpublished. Liebknecht—who feared that the popular Bebel would be susceptible to Marx's arguments—was "eminently successful in keeping the document from Bebel’s knowledge".

== Synopsis ==
Marx's critique is divided into four main parts, addressing different sections of the draft programme. His analysis focuses on two central themes: the programme's proposals for the distribution of the national product and its views on the state.

=== Distribution of social product ===
Marx first criticises the declaration that the "proceeds of labour" belong undiminished to all members of society. He dismisses this as a vague proposition that had been used by "champions of the state of society prevailing at any given time". He argues that the programme's focus on "fair distribution" misses the central issue, which is the need to transform the relations of production.

He objects to the demand that workers should receive the "undiminished proceeds of their labour", arguing that this showed a disregard for the practical necessities of a future communist society. Marx contended that a significant portion of the social product would need to be deducted before distribution to individual workers. These deductions would include funds for the replacement and expansion of the means of production, a reserve fund for insurance against accidents, and the costs of administering social services like schools and health services, as well as provisions for those unable to work. He states that in a communist society, the concept of "proceeds of labour" would lose its meaning, as producers would not exchange their products. Instead, individual labour would exist directly as a component of total labour, not mediated through exchange value, because abstract labour would be abolished.

=== Two phases of communist society ===
Marx outlines the principles of distribution that would apply in the "first phase of communist society", a society "which is thus in every respect, economically, morally and intellectually, still stamped with the birthmarks of the old society from whose womb it emerges". In this anticipated lower phase, each producer receives back from society precisely what they contribute, based on the actual amount of time that the individual works. This principle is distinct from the determination of value by socially necessary labour time under capitalism. He writes:

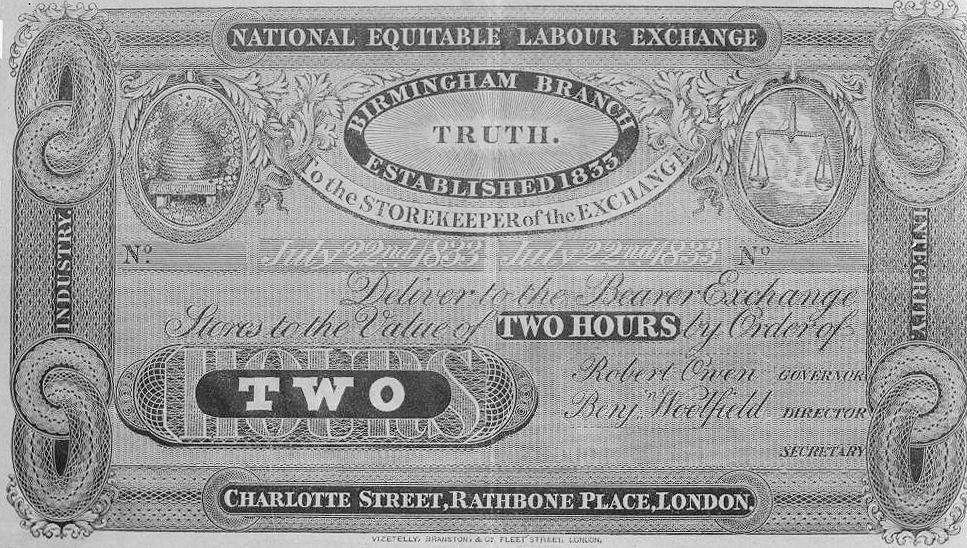
A "labour note" from Robert Owen's National Equitable Labour Exchange, 1830s. Marx proposed a similar system of certificates for the lower phase of communism, where individuals would receive goods equivalent to the amount of labour they contributed.

He receives a certificate from society that he has furnished such and such an amount of labour (after deducting his labour for the common funds), and with this certificate he draws from the social stock of means of consumption as much as costs the same amount of labour. The same amount of labour which he has given to society in one form he receives back in another.

Marx contends this principle of equal right is, in effect, unequal. Because it uses an equal standard (labour) to measure individuals who are inherently unequal in their capacities, family situations, and so on, it creates inequality. One worker might be stronger, or have more children to support than another. This system, which he characterises as still adhering to a "bourgeois right", is an unavoidable defect of the first phase. Marx's discussion of "duration or intensity" as a measure of labour refers to the actual hours worked, not to productive output, thus refuting the common interpretation of this principle as "to each according to his work".

A "higher phase of communist society" becomes possible only after these perceived defects are overcome. In this phase, the division of labour and the antithesis between mental and physical labour would have vanished, and labour would have become not merely a means of life but "life's prime desire". When society's productive forces have increased with the "all-round development of the individual", society can finally inscribe on its banners:

From each according to his ability, to each according to his needs!

Throughout this discussion, Marx uses the terms "socialism" and "communism" interchangeably. The later distinction between the two as representing distinct stages of social development is alien to Marx's thought.

=== Critique of the state and revolution ===
Marx's second major criticism addresses the programme's views on the state. He attacks the call for a "free state" as an aim unworthy of socialists, arguing that the whole programme was "tainted through and through by the Lassallean sect's servile belief in the state". He then poses the question: "What transformation will the body politic [Staatswesen] undergo in communist society?" He points toward a period of hypothetical political transition between capitalism and communism:

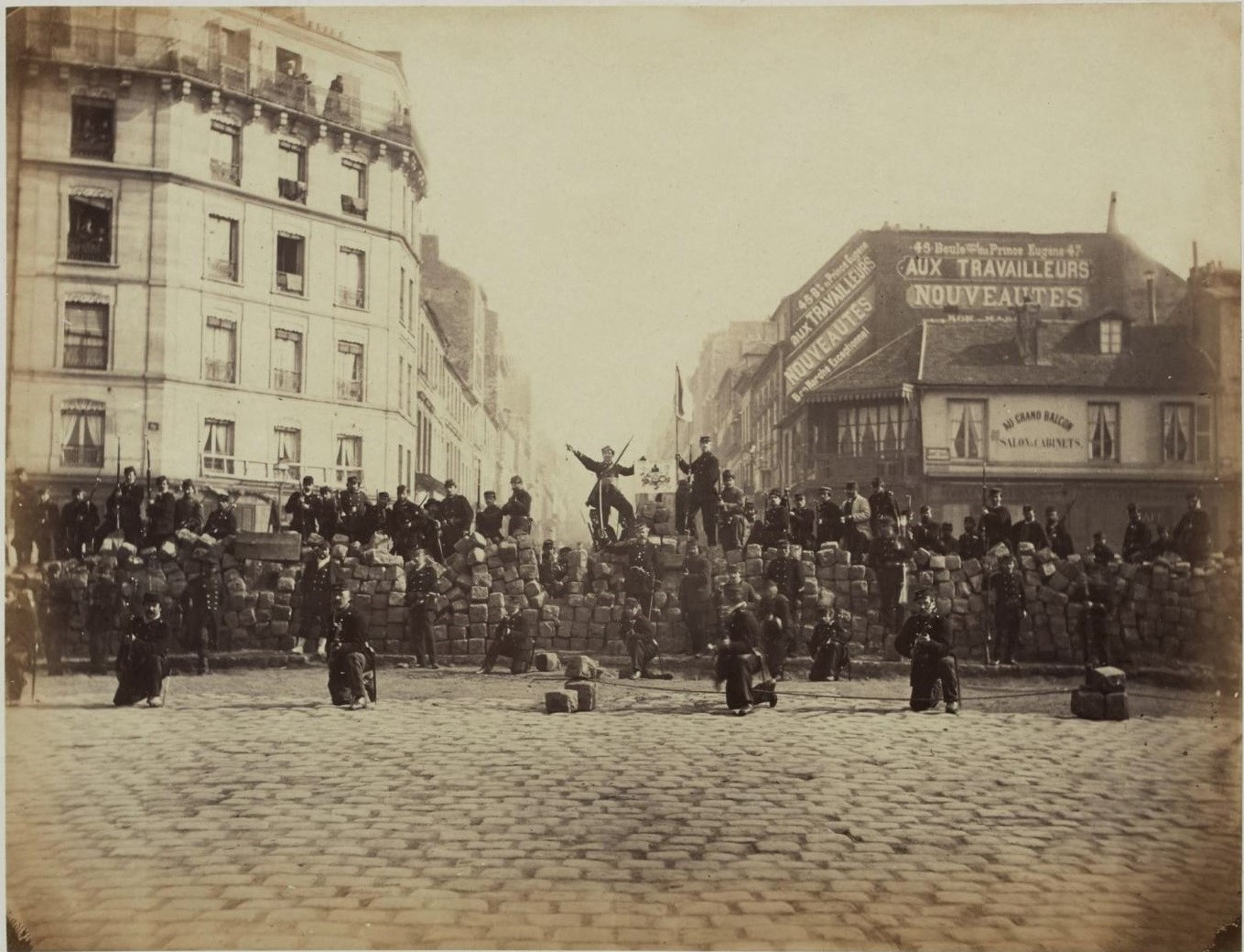
Barricade during the Paris Commune of 1871. Marx viewed the Commune as the first historical prototype of the "dictatorship of the proletariat," the transitional state between capitalism and communism.

Between capitalist and communist society lies the period of the revolutionary transformation of the one into the other. Corresponding to this is also a political transition period in which the state can be nothing but the revolutionary dictatorship of the proletariat.

This transition period, which Marx clarifies is not part of socialism or communism, would begin with the self-government of communities and would be rule by the masses, not for them. This government-form would be "thoroughly democratic and inclusive" but would be superseded once the economic basis of class society has been destroyed.

Marx asserts that the Gotha Programme contained nothing but the "old familiar democratic litany"—universal suffrage, direct legislation, popular rights, and a people's militia. He argues that these demands had already been realised in progressive bourgeois republics and were not revolutionary goals in themselves. As part of this, Marx questioned whether legal concepts of "rights" were inherently bourgeois. He suggested that all rights were indissolubly connected to egoistic, individualistic interests and that a communist society would move beyond the need for a legal and judicial apparatus to enforce them. He also criticises the programme's proposed solution to the "social question", which relied on state-aided workers' co-operatives. Marx argues that the "iron law of wages", a Lassallean concept, was based on a misunderstanding of the nature of wages, which were not the value of labour, but the value of labour power. The wage system, he concludes, is a "system of slavery" that becomes more severe as the productive forces of labour develop, regardless of whether the worker receives better or worse payment.

== Publication and legacy ==
Marx intended the Critique as a set of corrective notes for the Eisenach leaders and did not seek its wider publication. The text remained an internal document. After the unity congress, the Lassallean and Eisenach factions merged to form the Socialist Workers' Party of Germany (SAPD), which would later become the Social Democratic Party of Germany (SPD).

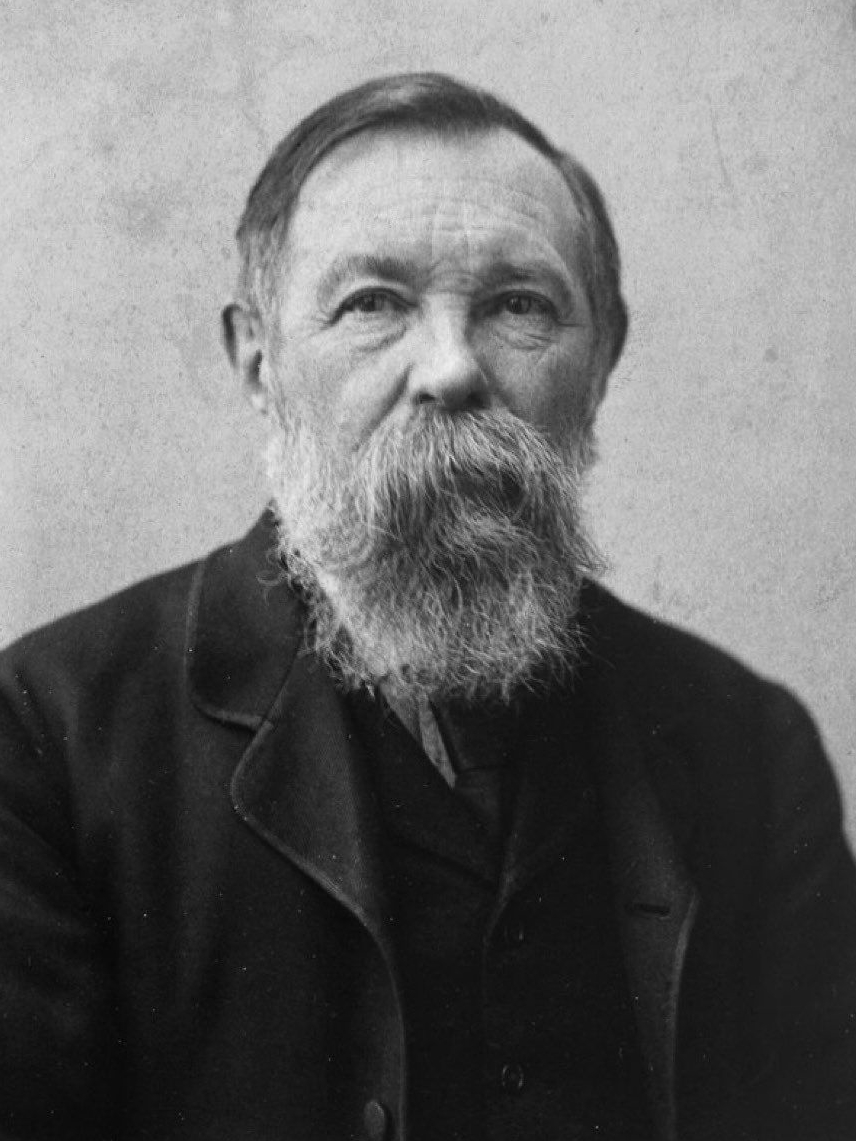
Friedrich Engels published the Critique in 1891, eight years after Marx's death.

Engels, who shared Marx's critique, published the manuscript in 1891 as the SPD was drafting a new programme, hoping it would help steer the party toward a more scientifically grounded platform. The party leadership again tried to suppress the document, but Engels threatened them with public exposure, ensuring its publication in the SPD's theoretical journal, Die Neue Zeit. Engels's intervention was crucial, as the leadership's efforts at suppression "would probably have succeeded, perhaps permanently, if Engels had not been still alive to break through the conspiracy of silence".

The publication was a "bombshell", provoking an angry reaction from the SPD's parliamentary group in the Reichstag, who suggested that the party's journal be placed under censorship. The Critique became a subject of political debate in the Reichstag itself, where opponents used it to attack the party. The SPD deputy Karl Grillenberger repudiated the text, claiming the party had not endorsed its proposals and that there was no question of a "revolutionary dictatorship of the proletariat". Liebknecht, in a later speech, employed a tu quoque argument, claiming that the bourgeois parties already exercised a "dictatorship of the bourgeoisie" and that closing off legal avenues for workers would make the "dictatorship of the proletariat" a necessity.

The Critique of the Gotha Programme has since become a central text in Marxist theory, valued as Marx's "most sustained, detailed, and explicit discussion" of revolutionary strategy and the transition to communism. The text became a foundational work for Vladimir Lenin. In 1917, on the eve of the October Revolution, Lenin wrote The State and Revolution, a work that is in large part an elaboration of the ideas in the Critique. Lenin championed the Critique for its clear rejection of reformism, emphasizing Marx's argument that the existing state could not be taken over but must be "smashed", and he brought renewed focus to the concept of the "dictatorship of the proletariat".

However, Lenin's interpretation also departed from Marx's text in ways that shaped the course of Marxism–Leninism. According to some analyses, Lenin misconstrued the lower phase of communism by arguing that wage labour would continue, with all citizens becoming hired employees of the state, rather than adopting Marx's concept of remuneration based on actual labour time through vouchers. Lenin is also credited with establishing the distinction between "socialism" (the lower phase) and "communism" (the higher phase) as two separate historical stages, a reading that some scholars argue is not found in Marx's own writings, where the terms are used interchangeably. This interpretation, which became a staple of Stalinism, pushed the ultimate goal of communism to a distant future while justifying statist policies in the name of "socialism". This conceptual framework shaped the 1936 Stalinist constitution, which defined the Soviet Union as a "socialist" society based on the principle of distribution "to each according to his work".
