= Gotha Program =

1875 platform of the Social Democratic Party of Germany

- Original title: Gothaer Programm
- Ratified: 22 (Note: While many sources cite May 22 as the beginning of the congress, the official history of the SPD notes that the formal meeting of the 130 delegates began on May 23, coinciding with the 12th anniversary of the founding of the ADAV.)–27 May 1875
- Location: Gotha, German Empire
- Author: Wilhelm Liebknecht
- Signatories: Social Democratic Party of Germany
- Media type: Party platform
- Superseded by: Erfurt Program (1891)

Full text
- Gotha Program at Wikisource

The Gotha Program (German: Gothaer Programm) was the party platform adopted by what would become the Social Democratic Party of Germany (SPD) at its initial conference, held in the city of Gotha from 22 to 27 May 1875. Written by Wilhelm Liebknecht, the program was the result of a compromise between the two founding factions of the party: the Marxist-influenced Social Democratic Workers' Party (SDAP), known as the "Eisenachers", and the General German Workers' Association (ADAV), founded by Ferdinand Lassalle.

The program called for universal suffrage, freedom of association, limits on the working day, and other laws protecting the rights and health of workers. While its immediate demands were radically democratic for the time, the Gotha Program was strongly influenced by Lassalleanism, declaring the party's intention to pursue its goals "by every legal means" and calling for the establishment of state-aided producer co-operatives.

This deference to Lassallean ideas drew sharp criticism from Karl Marx, an opponent of Lassalle who had been living in London. In an 1875 letter later published as the Critique of the Gotha Program, Marx attacked the program for a variety of perceived flaws. Marx took issue with what he saw as its theoretical vagueness, its lack of a revolutionary and class-based analysis, its embrace of bourgeois democratic ideals, and its concessions to the power of the state. The Gotha Program served the unified party for 16 years. During the period of Anti-Socialist Laws from 1878 to 1890, the party became more explicitly revolutionary and Marxist in its outlook. In 1891, following the repeal of the laws and the publication of Marx's critique, the party adopted the more Marxist Erfurt Program.

== Background ==
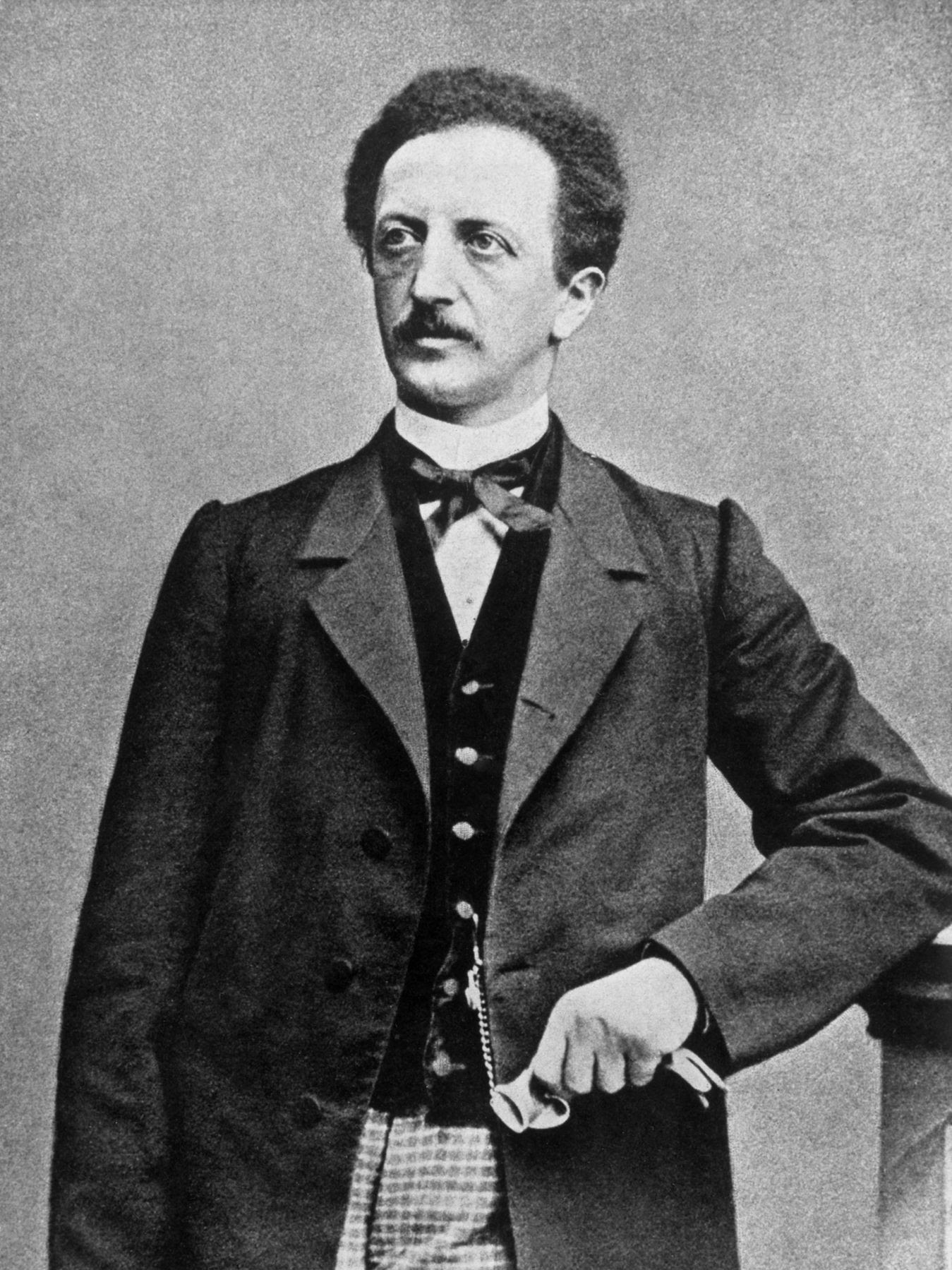
Ferdinand Lassalle

In the 1860s and early 1870s, the German socialist movement consisted of two main rival parties. The first, the General German Workers' Association (ADAV), was founded by Ferdinand Lassalle in 1863. Lassalle's program aimed to achieve socialism through the introduction of democracy, primarily by establishing producer co-operatives with state support. The second party was the Social Democratic Workers' Party (SDAP), founded in 1869 by Wilhelm Liebknecht, a disciple of Karl Marx, and the young activist August Bebel. The party's program, known as the Eisenach Program, was more explicitly Marxist and revolutionary, distinguishing it from the Lassallean ADAV.

After the unification of Germany in 1871, the old political divisions over unification became less relevant, and the two parties found common cause in defending the living standards of the working class against rising prices. This shared interest created an opening for a formal merger. Governmental repression of both parties following the unification of Germany also pushed them towards a merger. Leaders of the two factions held preliminary conferences in December 1874 and February 1875, where they produced a draft program for a unified party. The formal unity congress, where a unity commission representing both parties met, was held in Gotha from 22 to 27 May 1875. For the Eisenach leaders, the goal of achieving unity in the German labor movement for the practical pursuit of democratic objectives took precedence over strict adherence to Marxist doctrine. Marx’s primary grievance with the draft was its inclusion of Lassallean concepts—specifically the "iron law of wages" and the demand for state-aided producer cooperatives—which he viewed as a capitulation to the Prussian state and a misunderstanding of the capitalist mode of production.

== Content ==
The conference in Gotha produced both a new, unified party—the Socialist Workers' Party of Germany (SAPD)—and a new party platform. The Gotha Program has been described as an "awkward synthesis" of the traditional ideas of the Lassallean and Eisenacher factions. It was, in the words of historian Carl Schorske, "more strongly influenced by Lassalle than by Marx."

The program, written by Liebknecht, synthesized ideas from both factions. The political demands reflected the Eisenacher tradition, calling for a "Free State" (freier Staat) and demanding universal, equal, and direct suffrage; direct legislation by the people; and full civil liberties. The economic planks were strongly Lassallean, calling for the creation of state-financed producer co-operatives to abolish the iron law of wages and declaring that, in contrast to the working class, "all other classes are but one reactionary mass"; an explicit link to the trade union movement was not included. As a concession to the Eisenachers, Liebknecht did manage to add a stronger commitment to working-class internationalism than had appeared in the initial draft. A key plank that reflected the influence of the Lassallean faction was the pledge that the party would pursue its aims "with every legal means".

== Marx's critique ==
Karl Marx strongly criticized the program's Lassallean compromises.

The program was sent to Karl Marx in London for his review before its adoption. Marx responded with "intense annoyance" and wrote a lengthy letter, later known as the Critique of the Gotha Program, detailing his objections. In it, he argued that the program was "confused, state-socialistic," and theoretically inadequate, and that it had made too many concessions to Lassalleanism. He contended that it "contained none of his analysis of economic development, no word of revolution, and no clear indication of the class character of the state".

Alongside his criticisms of the program's Lassallean economic planks, Marx and his close associate Friedrich Engels attacked the notion of "one reactionary mass", the implicit anti-trade unionism of the "iron law of wages", and the conception of a "free people's state". Marx launched a strong attack on its political demands, which he dismissed as an "old democratic litany". He argued that the call for a "free state" was a misguided concession to bourgeois democracy, as the state was an instrument of class rule. For Marx, the democratic republic was not the final goal of socialism, but rather a transitional political form for the dictatorship of the proletariat.

The German party leaders did not publish Marx's critique. While Bebel and Liebknecht agreed with the substance of the critique, they concluded that unity was a more immediate priority. Bebel, who was privately annoyed with Marx's harsh tone, was confident that the programmatic concessions were insignificant. He believed that the new party's organizational structure, which was largely based on that of the SDAP, would ensure that the Eisenacher faction would retain control. Under the new party's rules, the dictatorial presidency of the ADAV was replaced with a central executive, the annual congresses were given supreme authority, and the party was committed to maintaining a strong local press. The critique was suppressed by Liebknecht, who cited the need for party unity and his own ideological disagreement with Marx's position; Liebknecht and the other Eisenachers remained committed to the democratic republic as their final political goal. The critique remained withheld from the general party membership until 1891, when Engels, at the encouragement of Karl Kautsky, published it in the party's theoretical journal, Die Neue Zeit.

== Legacy and replacement ==
Despite Marx's objections, the Gotha Program was adopted and served as the official platform of the unified party for the next 16 years. After the party was effectively outlawed by Otto von Bismarck's Anti-Socialist Laws in 1878, it was forced to operate illegally, and its revolutionary tendencies grew stronger. At its 1880 congress-in-exile in Wyden, Switzerland, the party unanimously voted to strike the clause pledging to pursue its goals "by all legal means".

By the time the Anti-Socialist Laws were repealed in 1890, the German socialist movement had become more receptive to orthodox Marxism. The first formal demand for a revision of the Gotha Program was made at the party's 1887 congress in St. Gallen, and a committee was appointed to draft a new one. The publication of Marx's Critique by Engels in 1891 provided further momentum for a complete revision of the party platform. Its publication touched off a debate in which Marxist intellectuals in the party severely criticized the program's Lassallean concessions. The Gotha Program was formally superseded by the new Erfurt Program, drafted primarily by Kautsky, which was adopted at the party's 1891 congress in Erfurt. The Erfurt Program was more explicitly Marxist and enshrined Marxism as the official doctrine of the party, now renamed the Social Democratic Party of Germany (SPD). While the new program represented a major theoretical shift, its immediate political aims were "in essence almost the same as those that had appeared in the Gotha program".
