= The Class Struggle (Erfurt Program) =

1892 book by Karl Kautsky

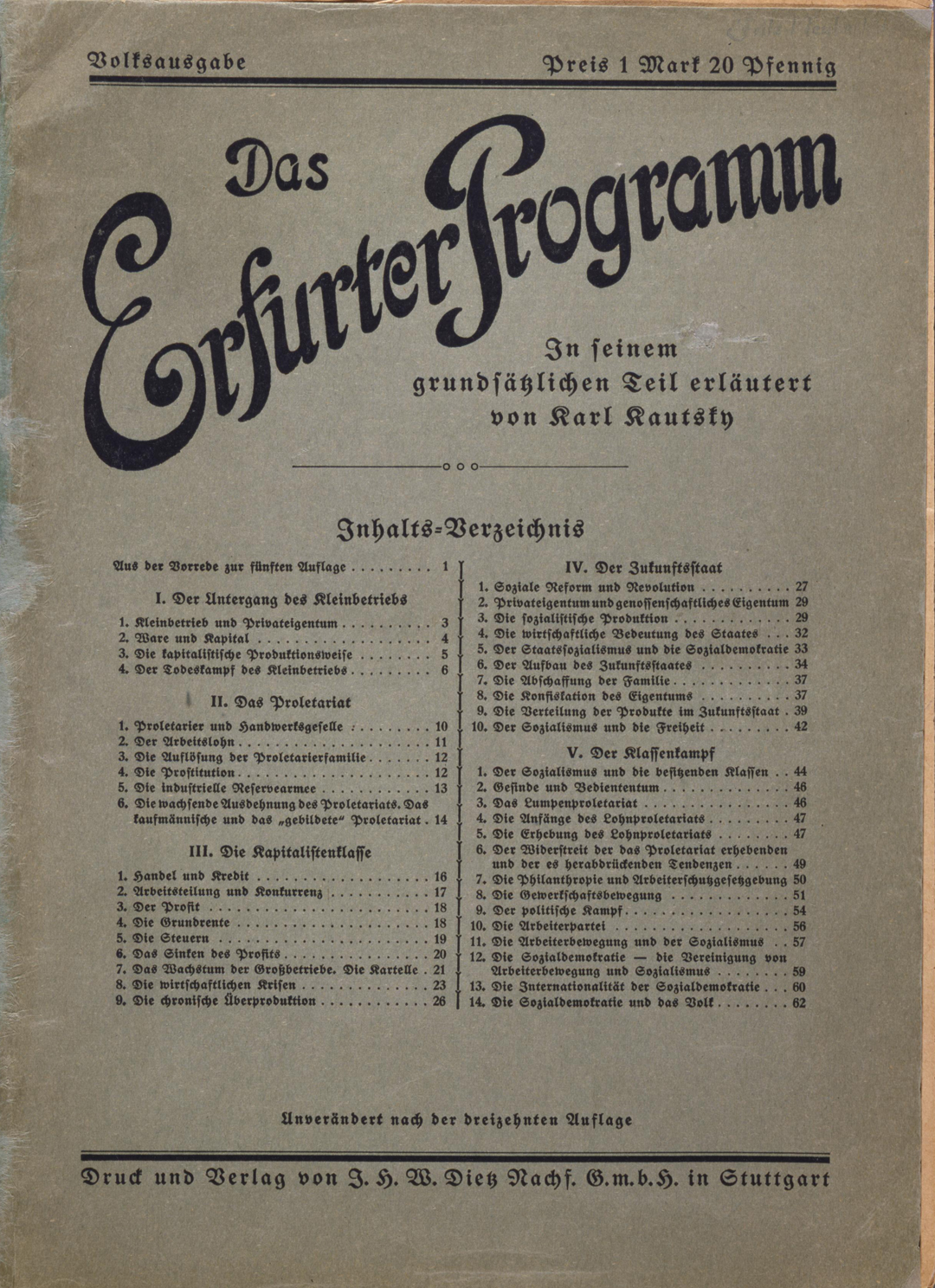
- Cover of a 1904 pamphlet version
- Author: Karl Kautsky
- Original title: Das Erfurter Programm in seinem grundsätzlichen Theil erläutert
- Language: German
- Subject: Erfurt Program
- Genre: Political philosophy
- Publisher: J. H. W. Dietz
- Publication date: 1892
- Publication place: Stuttgart, German Empire
- Text: The Class Struggle (Erfurt Program) at Wikisource

The Erfurt Program Explained in its Fundamental Part (German: Das Erfurter Programm in seinem grundsätzlichen Theil erläutert), commonly known as The Class Struggle (Erfurt Program), is an 1892 book by the Marxist theorist Karl Kautsky. It is a commentary on the 1891 Erfurt Program of the Social Democratic Party of Germany (SPD), for which Kautsky was a principal author. The book became one of the most widely read and influential works of Marxism, serving as a popular and systematic exposition of the theory for an international audience. It was Kautsky's first major work published without direct guidance from his mentor, Friedrich Engels, and cemented his reputation as the leading theoretician of the Second International.

The book analyzes the development of capitalism, the nature of the future socialist "commonwealth," and the tactics for achieving it. It outlines Kautsky's synthesis of Marxist theory, blending an emphasis on the historical inevitability of social revolution, rooted in economic development, with the necessity of conscious, organized political action by the proletariat. While Kautsky's prose reflected the pressures of internal party politics in Wilhelmine Germany, the work was widely received as a revolutionary document.

== Background ==
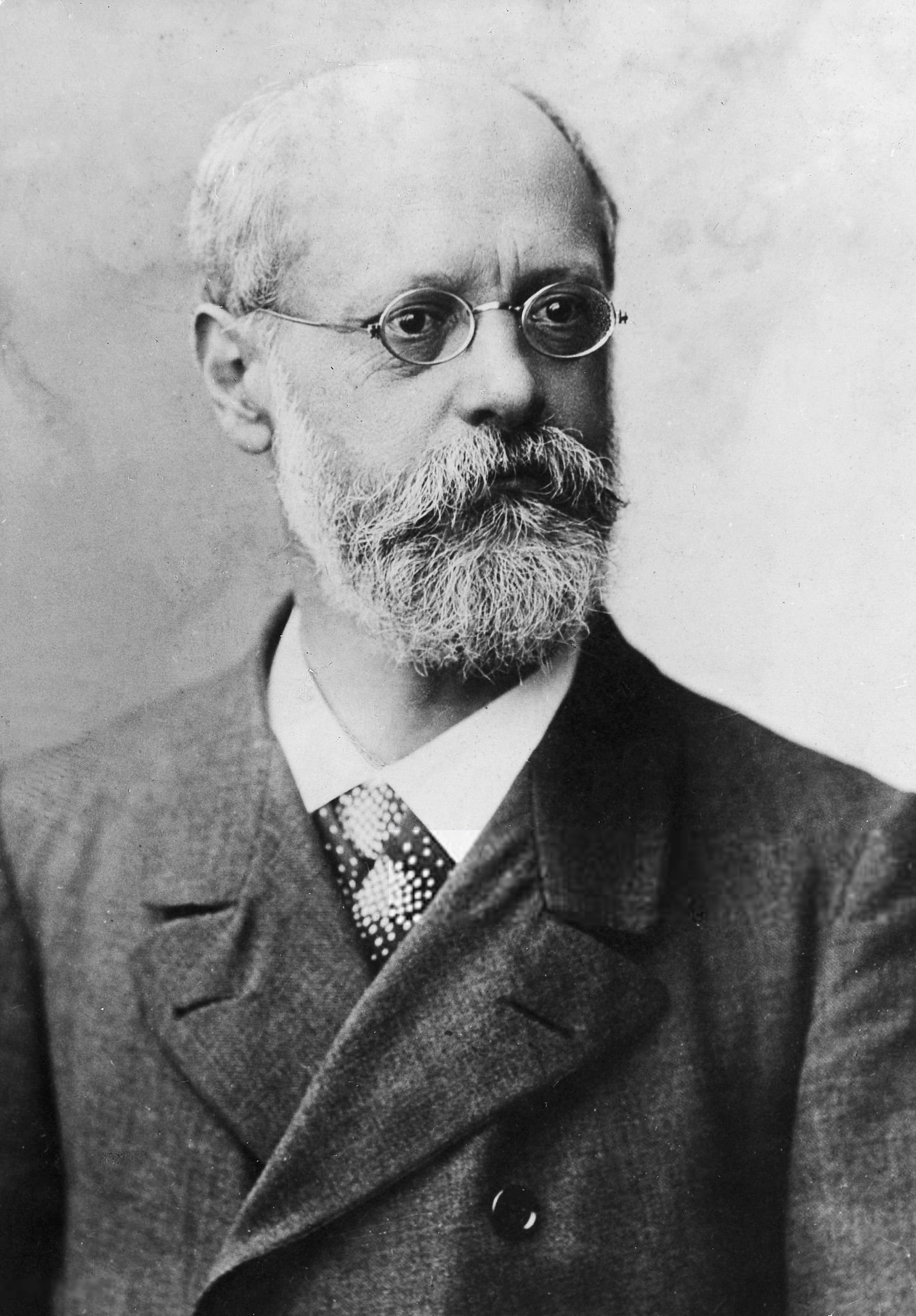
Karl Kautsky

At its 1891 party congress in Erfurt, the Social Democratic Party of Germany (SPD) adopted a new party platform, the Erfurt Program, following the repeal of the Anti-Socialist Laws in 1890. The program consisted of a theoretical section, drafted primarily by Karl Kautsky, and a practical section detailing legislative demands, written by Eduard Bernstein. At the party congress's program commission, Kautsky's shorter and crisper draft for the theoretical section was accepted as the working basis over a competing draft written by Wilhelm Liebknecht. According to historian Donald Sassoon, the Erfurt Program became one of the most widely read texts by socialist activists across Europe. Following the congress, the SPD's executive committee commissioned Kautsky to write a popular commentary to explain and elaborate upon the principles of the new program. This task expanded into a full-length book, Das Erfurter Programm, published in 1892.

The book became Kautsky's most famous and widely translated work. According to Kautsky's biographer, Gary P. Steenson, it was the first major work in which Kautsky presented his own formulation of Marxism without the direct guidance of his mentor, Friedrich Engels. English translations of the book, including the 1910 edition by W. E. Bohn, have usually been titled The Class Struggle after the book's fifth section, which Steenson notes is somewhat misleading given the book's broader scope.

== Summary ==
The Class Struggle is divided into five sections. The first three summarize material Kautsky had previously presented in The Economic Doctrines of Karl Marx, defining key Marxist terms and describing the process of capitalist development. Drawing on themes from both the Communist Manifesto and Das Kapital, Kautsky describes the "necessary" tendency of capitalist development toward the concentration of capital and the monopolization of wealth in the hands of a few capitalists and large landlords. This process simultaneously intensifies the exploitation and misery of the growing proletariat and the "decaying middle layers", leading to an "ever more bitter class struggle between the bourgeoisie and the proletariat". Kautsky argues that the essential features of the capitalist mode of production itself—its increasingly severe and widespread crises—provide the objective basis for the inevitable socialization of the means of production.

The fourth section, "The Commonwealth of the Future," discusses the transition to a socialist society. This was one of the few times Kautsky attempted to offer suggestions about the nature of post-capitalist society, a task he was generally hesitant to undertake due to the complexity of social development. He asserts the importance of human agency in history, stating, "When we speak of the irresistible and inevitable nature of social revolution, we presuppose that men are men and not puppets; that they are beings endowed with certain wants and impulses... which they will seek to use in their own interest." He offered several general predictions: the decay of the traditional family, the confiscation of large-scale private property (while protecting that of small artisans and peasants), a trend toward the equalization of wages, and the achievement of "freedom from labor" rather than simply "freedom of labor".

The final section addresses class relations and the tactics of the socialist movement. Kautsky emphasized the need for economic organization and political participation to advance the interests of the workers. However, he cautioned that the party must remain independent, maintain its exclusively working-class character, and understand that no amount of reform could delay the inevitable social revolution that would come with the maturation of capitalism and the industrial proletariat. He argued that revolution did not necessarily have to be accomplished through "violence and bloodshed," writing that a social revolution is a long-term process of political and economic struggle, not a single event. He suggested that if the ruling classes were "clever enough or weak and craven enough," they might abdicate voluntarily in the face of a hopeless situation. However, he also observed that "never yet was any revolution accomplished without vigorous action on the part of those who suffered most under existing conditions."

== Themes ==
A central theme of The Class Struggle is the relationship between historical determinism and human volition. Kautsky presents the victory of the proletariat as inevitable, a consequence of the economic laws of capitalism. At the same time, he stresses that this victory can only be achieved through the conscious, organized political struggle of the working class. This synthesis reflected Kautsky's attempt to balance the deterministic and voluntaristic elements within Marx's own writings. He argued that while objective conditions set the stage for revolution, it was the political action of the proletariat that would bring it about. The core of Kautsky's political recommendations for the SPD were the necessity of maintaining the party's proletarian purity, participating fully in the political process, and the inevitability of the eventual revolution. In the book, Kautsky encouraged those who detested capitalism by writing that "Irresistible economic forces lead with the certainty of doom to the shipwreck of capitalistic production." He asserted that "Capitalist society has failed. Its dissolution is now only a matter of time ... The creation of a new social form to replace the existing order is no longer merely desirable; it has become inevitable."

The book also reflects the political context of the SPD in the 1890s. Steenson notes that Kautsky's writing reveals the "moderating impact of internal party and external governmental pressures." Kautsky attempted to placate the reformist right wing of the party, which focused on parliamentary action and gradual improvements, without abandoning the party's official commitment to revolutionary Marxism. A key theme of the book is the indispensability of parliament as an instrument of government and political struggle. Kautsky argued that a "great modern state" could only be administered through a representative parliament, dismissing "direct legislation" as technically unworkable and politically sterile. For Kautsky, the conquest of a parliamentary majority by the SPD and the use of parliamentary legislation for socialist purposes was the content of the "dictatorship of the proletariat". Despite this balancing act, the book was overwhelmingly perceived by both party members and bourgeois critics as a revolutionary document in its time.

== Publication and reception ==
Published in 1892, Das Erfurter Programm quickly became Kautsky's most influential and widely translated book. It served as a comprehensive and accessible summary of Marxist theory for socialists across Europe and beyond, appearing to European socialist parties as "a sort of new Manifesto". Sassoon notes that popular works by Kautsky and August Bebel were read and distributed more widely than Marx's own works. By 1914, The Class Struggle had been translated into sixteen languages and "became the accepted popular summa of Marxism". Its success cemented Kautsky's reputation as the leading theoretician of the Second International. Vladimir Lenin, in 1899, praised the Erfurt Program as a model for other socialist parties to emulate.

In his introduction to a 1971 reissue of the 1910 English translation, scholar Robert C. Tucker described the book as "one of the minor classics of Marxist thought." The book's ideas, along with the Erfurt Program, came to define the orthodox Marxism that was later challenged by the revisionist movement led by Eduard Bernstein. Bernstein's critique attacked what he saw as the flawed "collapse theory" and "pauperization thesis" closely associated with Kautsky's Marxism. Kautsky would later respond that "the Erfurt Program contained 'not a single word on the theory of collapse'". He clarified that Marxists referred not to a mechanical economic process, but to the political and organizational maturation of the proletariat, which would bring an end to bourgeois society.

== See also ==
- The Road to Power
