= Forerunners of Modern Socialism =

Title page of Volume 1, Part 1 of Die Vorläufer des neueren Sozialismus (Forerunners of Modern Socialism).

Forerunners of Modern Socialism (German: Die Vorläufer des neueren Sozialismus) is a four volume work that documents the history of primitive communist and socialist ideas, edited by Karl Kautsky and including contributions by a number of prominent intellectuals of the Second International, including Eduard Bernstein, Paul Lafargue, C. Hugo, Franz Mehring, and Georgii Plekhanov. The first volume was published in 1895.

Although only partially translated into English as of the middle of the 2010s, this German-language work is regarded as an important pioneering Marxist study of the history of the impact of early Christianity and various classical philosophical thinkers upon the modern socialist movement.

== Publication history ==
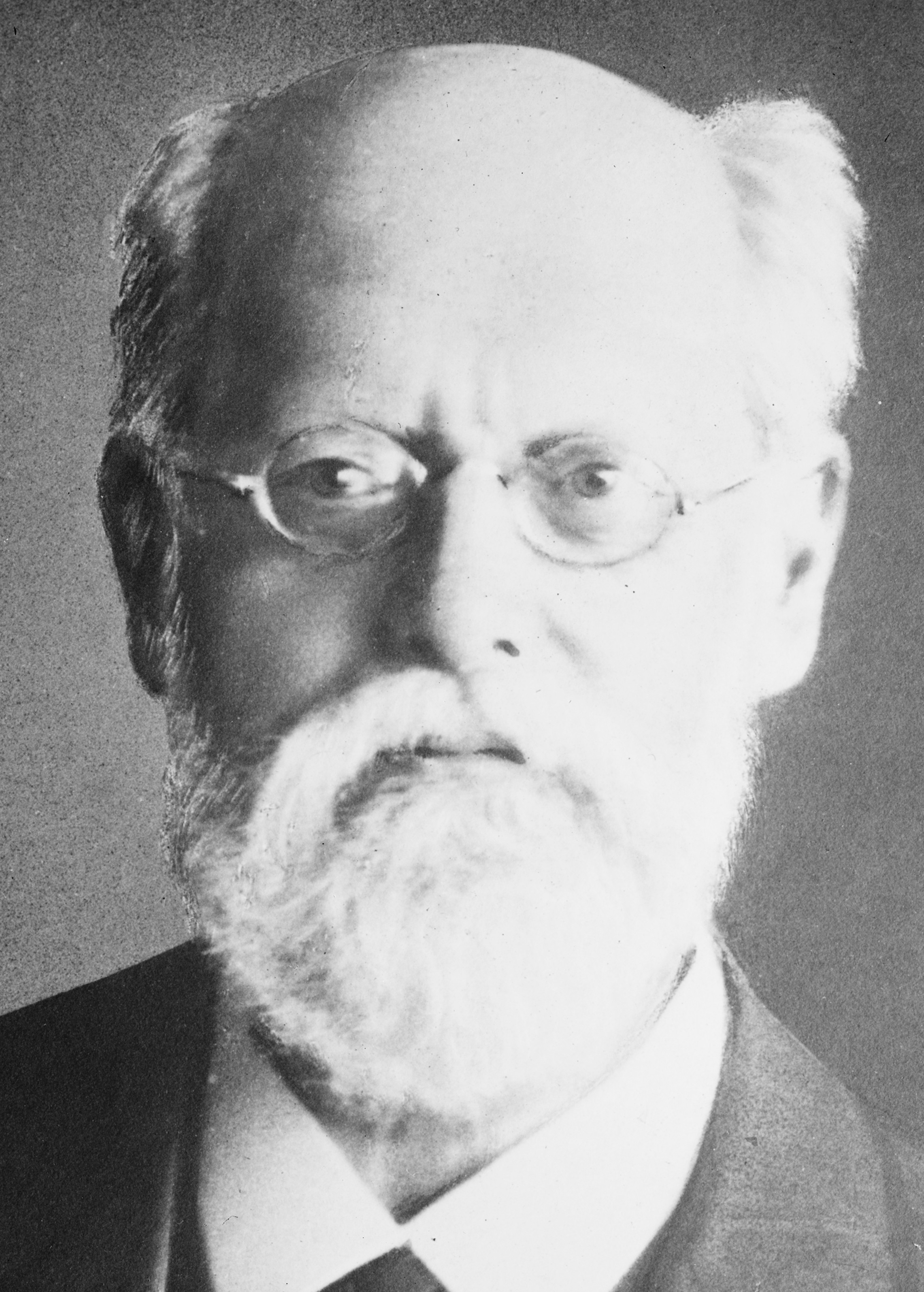
Karl Kautsky, called "the dean of German Marxism," was the editor of the four volume Die Vorläufer des neueren Sozialismus (Forerunners of Modern Socialism).

Forerunners of Modern Socialism was a series of volumes published under the general title "The History of Socialism in Individual Treatments" (German: Die geschichte des Sozialismus in Einzeldarstellungen), initiated under the editorship of Karl Kautsky (1854–1938). The first volume of what was to eventually emerge as a four volume work was published in Stuttgart by the Dietz publishing house and included topical contributions by Kautsky, Eduard Bernstein, Paul Lafargue, C. Hugo, Franz Mehring, and Georgii Plekhanov.

Kautsky contributed the chapters on Christianity from the ancient to the Reformation period. Eduard Bernstein contributed a chapter on Cromwell and Communism. Karl Marx's son in law, Paul Lafargue added substantial material on the Jesuit communistic community in Paraguay, also called the Jesuit reduction settlements, as well as Campanella's The City of the Sun.

It was a major work of Second International, Orthodox Marxism in analyzing history from ancient times to the early modern period.

Karl Kautsky, the leading theoretician of the Second International began his coverage of Thomas More with the observation that the two great figures inaugurating the history of socialism are More and Münzer, and that both of them "follow the long line of Socialists, from Lycurgus and Pythagoras to Plato, the Gracchi, Catiline, Christ..."

The final volume of the four-volume set was written by Hugo Lindemann and Morris Hillquit, focusing on socialism in France and America.

Engels wrote to Kautsky in 1895 a few months before his death "I have learnt a great deal from the book,[Forerunners of Modern Socialism, by K. Kautsky] it is an indispensable preliminary study for my new revision of the Peasant War. The main faults seem to be only two"

== Volumes ==
- Die Vorläufer des neueren Sozialismus: Erster Band, erster Theil: Von Plato bis zu den Wiedertäusern (Forerunners of Modern Socialism: Volume 1, Part 1: From Plato to the Anabaptists). Stuttgart, Germany: Verlag von J.H.W. Dietz, 1895.
- Die Vorläufer des neueren Sozialismus: Erster Band, zweiter Theil: Von Thomas More bis zum Vorabend der französischen Revolution (Forerunners of Modern Socialism: Volume 1, Part 2: From Thomas More to the Eve of the French Revolution). Stuttgart, Germany: Verlag von J.H.W. Dietz, 1895.
  - Karl Kautsky, Thomas More and his Utopia. H.J. Stenning, trans. London: A.C. Black/ILP; New York: International Publishers, 1927. —From vol. 1, pt. 2.
