= The Road to Power =

1909 book by Karl Kautsky

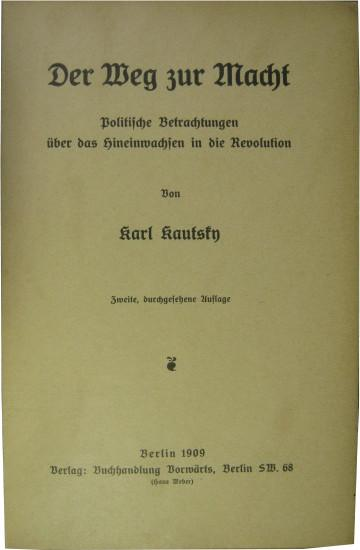
- Title page of the first edition
- Author: Karl Kautsky
- Original title: Der Weg zur Macht: Politische Betrachtungen über das Hineinwachsen in die Revolution
- Language: German
- Published: 1909
- Publisher: Buchhandlung Vorwärts
- Publication place: Berlin, German Empire

The Road to Power: Political Reflections on Growing into the Revolution (German: Der Weg zur Macht. Politische Betrachtungen über das Hineinwachsen in die Revolution) is a 1909 book by the Marxist theorist Karl Kautsky. Written at a time of growing internal division in the Social Democratic Party of Germany (SPD), the book was a defense of orthodox Marxist revolutionary strategy against the party's increasingly influential reformist wing. It argued that the era of peaceful capitalist development was ending and that a period of intense crisis and war would create a revolutionary situation, making the "conquest of political power by the proletariat" an imminent possibility.

The book was received very differently in Germany and Russia. In Germany, its publication caused a scandal within the SPD; the party executive tried to suppress it, and it drew criticism from both the reformist right and the radical left. In Russia, however, the Bolsheviks, including Vladimir Lenin, enthusiastically embraced the work as a "most complete exposition of the tasks of our times" and an endorsement of their own revolutionary positions. After the outbreak of World War I, Lenin repeatedly cited The Road to Power to denounce Kautsky as a "renegade" who had betrayed his own revolutionary principles. According to historian Lars T. Lih, the book helped to inspire the Bolsheviks to carry out the October Revolution in 1917, a "revolution à la Kautsky".

== Background ==
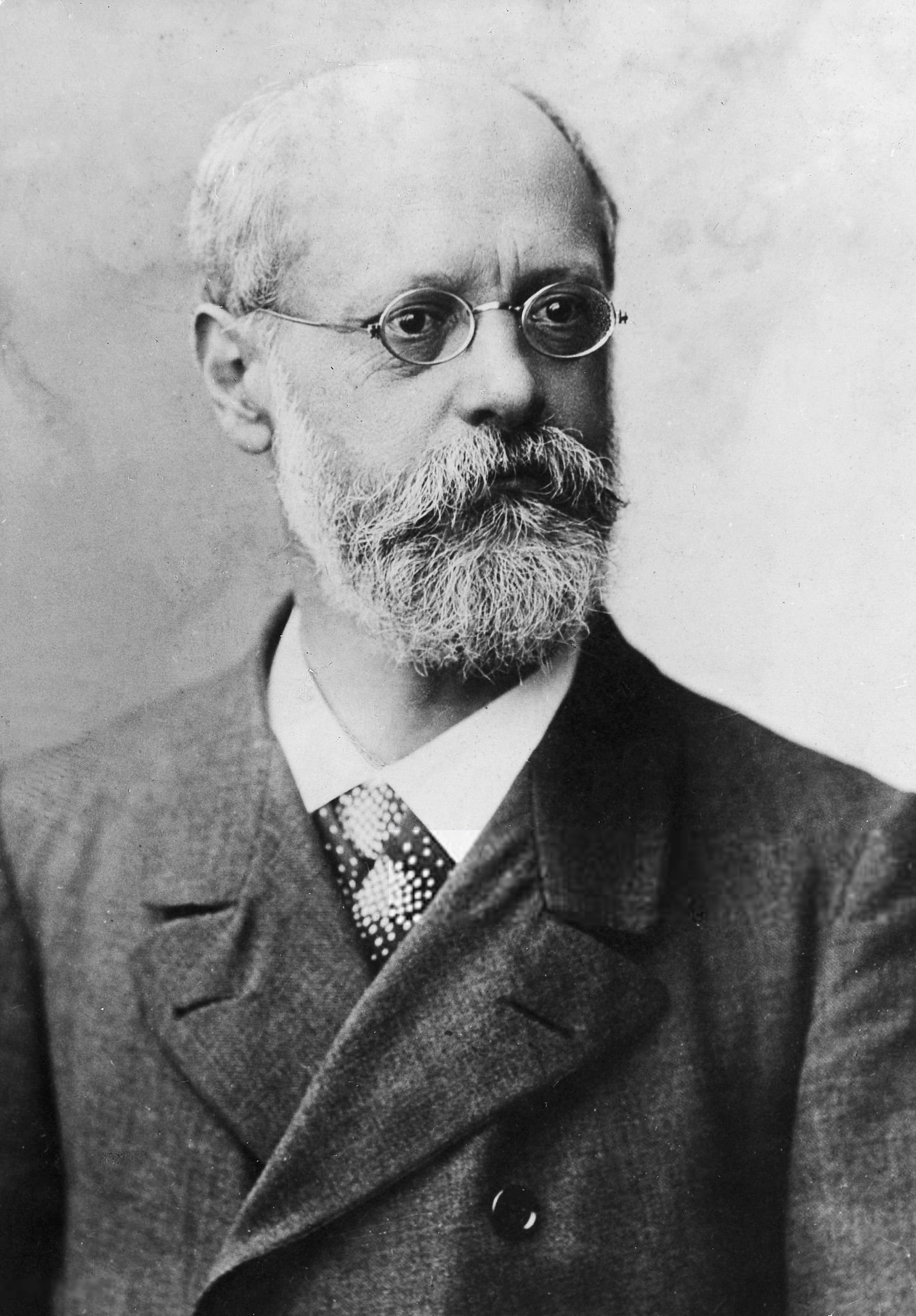
Karl Kautsky

Karl Kautsky wrote The Road to Power in response to what he saw as the dangerous growth of reformism and the decline of revolutionary fervor within the German socialist movement. The SPD's severe electoral losses in the 1907 Reichstag election, which were driven by a wave of nationalist and colonialist sentiment, intensified the party's internal divisions. In the aftermath, during the era of the Bülow Bloc, the party's right wing became more assertive in its push for a less confrontational, more reform-oriented strategy. A particular point of conflict was the decision by SPD delegations in the South German state parliaments (Landtage) to vote in favor of provincial budgets, a move that broke with the party's long-standing tradition of opposing any budget that strengthened the existing state.

As the leading theorist of "orthodox" Marxism, Kautsky saw these developments as a dangerous departure from the party's principles. Described by historian Carl Schorske as the "one comprehensive theoretical treatise" of the party's radicals during this period, The Road to Power was conceived as a "complement" to Kautsky's 1902 work The Social Revolution and intended as a forceful restatement of the party's revolutionary foundations. Kautsky expanded on earlier articles from Die Neue Zeit, the party's theoretical journal which he edited, to reach a wider party audience. He sought to demonstrate that the era of relatively peaceful capitalist progress was ending and that a new period of intense crisis and war would create a revolutionary situation, requiring the party to prepare for a revolutionary confrontation rather than seek accommodation with the existing order.

== Synopsis ==
In The Road to Power, Kautsky argued that a new "period of struggles" was imminent. He rejected the reformist idea that socialists could peacefully "grow in" to power, contending that imperialism, as the "last refuge of capitalism", was leading to a sharpening of class antagonisms, a growing arms race, and the increasing likelihood of a world war. Kautsky predicted that the inevitable "world war is ominously imminent, and war means also revolution." Consequently, he asserted, the proletariat "can no longer speak of a premature revolution." While his rival on the radical left, Rosa Luxemburg, had envisioned this revolution taking the form of mass upheavals, Kautsky contended that it was impossible to "know the form and character of the revolution" in advance. He wrote that it could be a long, bloody struggle or be "fought exclusively by means of economic, legislative and moral pressure." The revolution was an inevitable product of historical development that could neither be artificially provoked nor prevented.

Kautsky reiterated that the "dictatorship of the proletariat" (Diktatur des Proletariats), which he defined as the "exclusive rule" (Alleinherrschaft) of the proletariat, was the "only form" in which the working class could exercise political power. He maintained that such a regime could only be established once the proletariat had won the support of the majority of the population.

The book outlined four preconditions for a successful revolution:

1. The state must be decisively hostile to the masses.
2. A large party must exist in "irreconcilable opposition".
3. This party must represent the interests and have the trust of the great majority of the nation.
4. Confidence in the ruling regime, including its bureaucracy and army, must be shaken.

Kautsky argued that these conditions were maturing in Germany, pointing to the growth of militarism, the rise of national revolutions in Asia, and especially the "moral decay" of the ruling classes, exemplified by the recent Eulenburg affair. To take advantage of this situation, he argued, the SPD must maintain its "moral integrity" and its character as an "indestructible power in the midst of the destruction of all authority." The party had to pursue its goals "through strictly legal methods alone" and avoid any "ministerialism" (participation in bourgeois governments) or budget-voting that would compromise its oppositional stance. He argued to the reformists that the working class would only remain loyal to the party and its practical reformist work as long as it believed in the party's revolutionary character.

Kautsky also presented the book as a defense of the importance of theory and the party's intellectuals against the practical, day-to-day focus of the party's bureaucracy and the trade unions. He argued that no matter how much the party and unions grew, they could never hope to organize more than an elite of the working class. The unorganized masses were "only revolutionary as a possibility, not a reality." He concluded that only effective socialist propaganda and theory could "convert the possibility into reality" by raising the consciousness of the masses and preparing them for the revolutionary moment. He argued that in revolutionary periods the party's "attractive power" grows, allowing it to represent the entire class. The party's main functions were agitation and organization; it was to remain in "irreconcilable" opposition to the existing order, preparing to lead the masses when the revolutionary crisis, brought about by the ruling class's own contradictions, inevitably arrived.

== Publication and controversy ==
The Road to Power was first issued by the SPD's official publishing house, Vorwärts, in January 1909. The first edition of 5,000 copies sold out within weeks. In February 1909, however, the SPD's central committee (the Parteivorstand) voted, with only one dissent, to prohibit its further distribution. The party leadership feared that the book's "exaggerated radicalism" and predictions of revolution could provoke government repression and provide grounds for a trial for high treason. The party leader August Bebel, though privately agreeing with Kautsky's analysis, chastised him for his lack of tactical sense, writing that Kautsky "contemplates, as if hypnotized, the goal, and has no interest in, or understanding of, anything else."

The attempt to suppress the book caused a storm within the party. Kautsky's allies, particularly the party's radical left wing, were outraged. The trade-union leadership and much of the party bureaucracy, in contrast, saw the book as a "fundamental attack on their positions" and supported the executive's decision, publishing a pamphlet titled Sisyphean Labor or Positive Successes? that caricatured Kautsky's arguments as a condemnation of their practical work. Kautsky responded by threatening to leave Germany and taking his case to the party's Control Commission. There, his close friend Clara Zetkin used her influence to persuade the executive to relent.

A second edition was published in April 1909 after Kautsky agreed to minor editorial changes and added a preface taking personal responsibility for the book's contents, dissociating the party from its views. The changes primarily involved removing some instances of the word "revolution," though the substance of the work remained intact. The book was reissued, with second and third editions of 5,000 copies each selling out quickly, and became one of Kautsky's best-selling works.

== Reception and legacy ==
=== In Germany ===
Within the SPD, the book was divisive. The party's right wing and the trade-union leadership saw it as a dangerous and irresponsible provocation. The radical left, while agreeing with its revolutionary conclusion, criticized Kautsky for what they saw as a passive, "attentiste" (wait-and-see) strategy that shied away from advocating for immediate mass action. This latter view shaped later academic interpretations, such as that of Carl Schorske, who described the book's message as one of "revolutionary passivity." Schorske argued that Kautsky assigned a "passive role" to the proletariat, viewing it not as an "irresistible force" (as Luxemburg did) but as an "immovable object" that would be the "passive beneficiary" of the ruling class's self-destruction. In Schorske's view, the book represented a "return to the Erfurt synthesis" and served as a proposed "truce" between the party's wings, based on the theoretical concept of a "passive revolution" that allowed Kautsky to reconcile his revolutionary theory with the party's largely reformist practice. Kautsky himself, along with other radicals, invoked the book's ideas later in 1909 to argue against supporting new taxes to fund military expansion, striving to "keep the clear oppositional position of Social Democracy intact."

=== In Russia ===
In stark contrast to its reception in Germany, the book was enthusiastically received by the Bolsheviks in Russia. Grigory Zinoviev reviewed it immediately in the party journal Sotsial-Demokrat, hailing it as the "platform... of the left wing of the party" and a definitive refutation of revisionism. The Bolsheviks saw Kautsky's analysis of a new era of war and revolution, his rejection of alliances with liberals, and his insistence on "irreconcilable" opposition as a vindication of their own struggle against the Mensheviks.

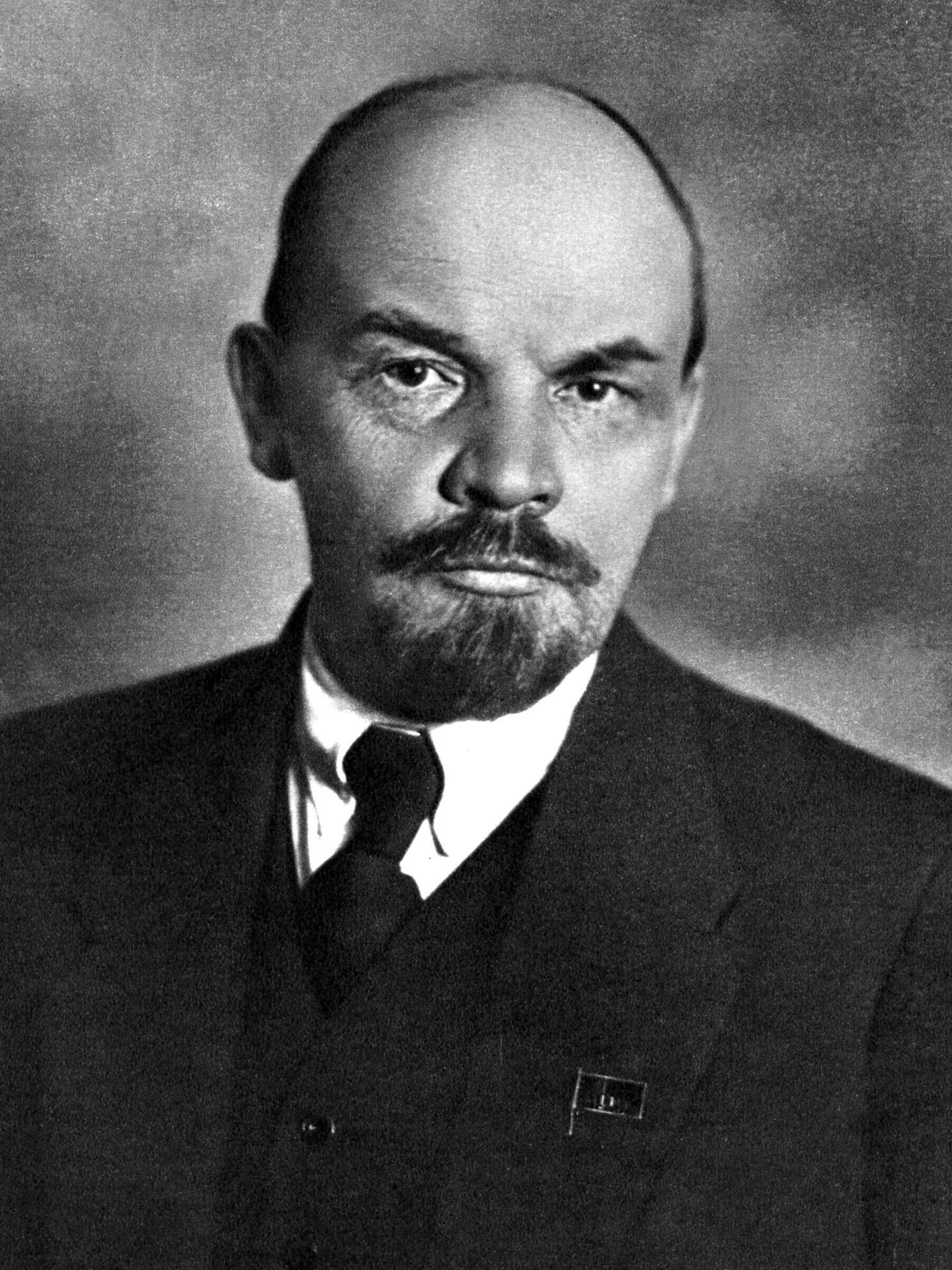
Vladimir Lenin

After the outbreak of World War I in 1914, Vladimir Lenin's praise for the book's content was joined by bitter denunciation of its author. Infuriated by Kautsky's wavering stance on the war, Lenin repeatedly and "obsessively" cited The Road to Power to portray Kautsky as a "renegade" who had betrayed his own revolutionary principles. In a December 1914 article, "Dead Chauvinism and Living Socialism," Lenin provided a detailed, chapter-and-verse summary of The Road to Power, quoting its revolutionary predictions to highlight the gap between Kautsky's pre-war theory and his wartime practice:

This is how Kautsky wrote in times long, long past, fully five years ago. This is what German Social-Democracy was, or, more correctly, what it promised to be. This was the kind of Social-Democracy that could and had to be respected.

According to historian Lars T. Lih, Lenin's continued reliance on the book's framework shows that he "clearly rediscovered the qualities of these books that had inspired him when he first read them." Lih argues that the Bolsheviks' strategy in 1917—their confidence that war had created a revolutionary situation, their focus on winning a majority of the toiling masses, and their use of that mass support to take power—followed the script laid out in The Road to Power. The October Revolution was, in this sense, a "revolution à la Kautsky."
