= Foundations of Christianity =

Book by Karl Kautsky

- Author: Karl Kautsky
- Original title: Der Ursprung des Christentums
- Translator: Henry F. Mins
- Language: English
- Subject: Religion
- Published: 1908 (in German); 1925 (George Allen and Unwin, in English); 1953 (Russell and Russell, in English); 1972 (Monthly Review Press, in English); 2007 (Socialist Resistance, in English)
- Publication place: Germany
- Media type: Print (hardback & paperback)
- Pages: 288
- ISBN: 978-0-902869-93-6

Foundations of Christianity (German: Der Ursprung des Christentums) is a 1908 book by Marxist theoretician Karl Kautsky. In it, he attempts to explain the origins of Christianity, and claims that it can best be explained by historical materialism rather than divinity.

== Publishing history ==
The first edition in English, published in 1925 by George Allen and Unwin, followed the eleventh German version. The German text was re-translated into English by Henry F. Mins, and published by Russell and Russell in 1953. In 1972, a translation by Jacob W. Hartmann was published by Monthly Review Press. The edition currently in print was published by Resistance in 2007 and contains a preface by Michael Lowy.

== Summary ==
In his foreword, Kautsky expressed his hope that the book would be 'a powerful weapon in the struggles of the present, in order to hasten the attainment of a better future'. He began his analysis by looking for evidence that 'the person of Jesus' existed at all, using pagan and Christian sources. The next dozen chapters are then taken up with a materialist description of the ancient Roman society from which early Christianity sprang. Kautsky then went on to describe the history of the Jewish people, up to the point where Christianity began.

Having set the scene, Kautsky described the beginnings of Christianity. The next five sections are called 'The Primitive Christian Community', 'The Christian Idea of the Messiah', 'Jewish Christians and Gentile Christians', 'The History of Christ's Passion' and 'The Development of the Christian Community'.

Kautsky contended that Christianity was born out of a group of Jewish proletarians in a morally decaying Roman Empire, who sought to defeat the Romans through a violent insurrection.
