= Karl Kautsky =

Austro-German Marxist theorist (1854–1938)

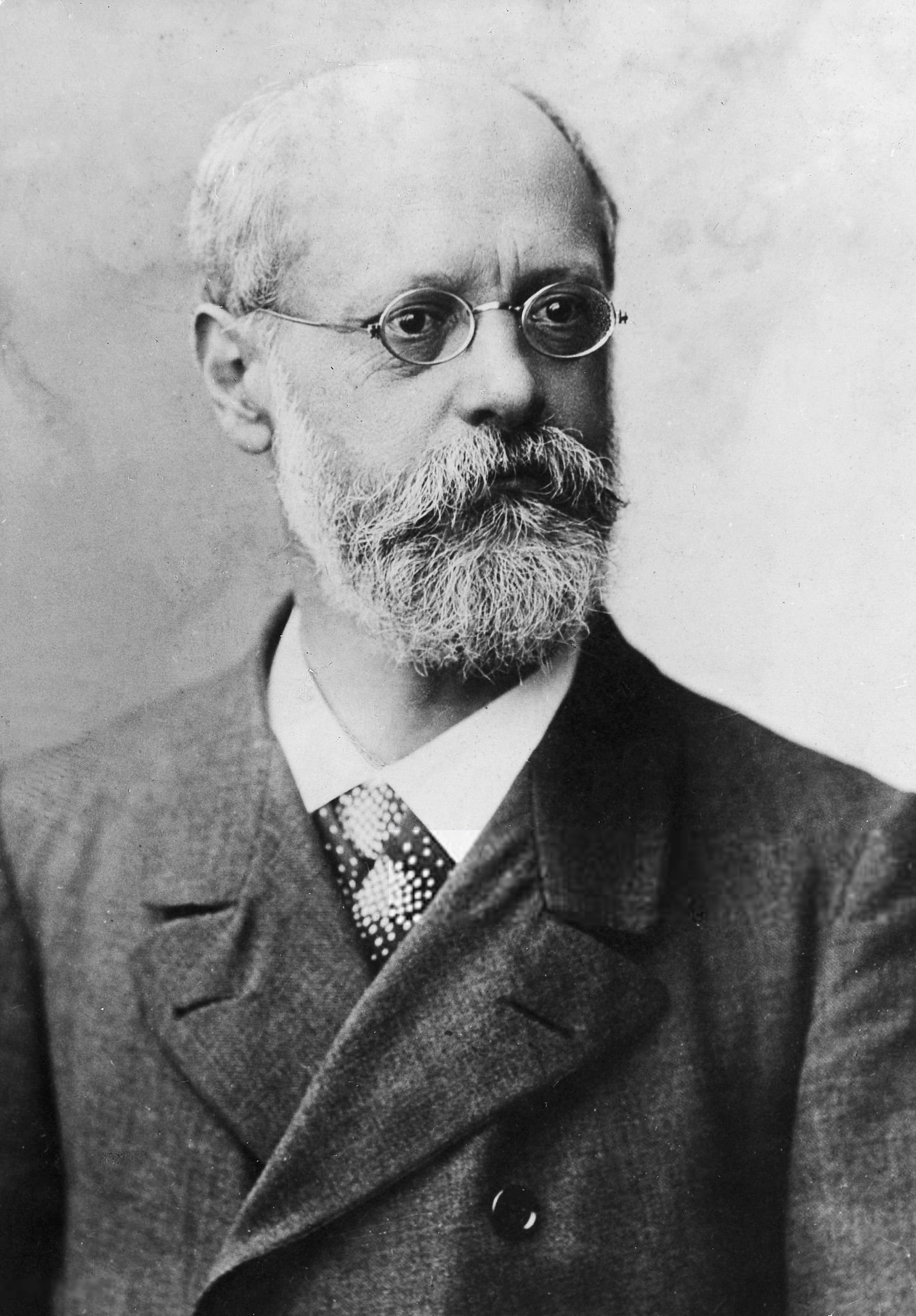
- Kautsky in 1904
- Born: Karl Johann Kautsky; 16 October 1854; Prague, Austrian Empire
- Died: 17 October 1938 (aged 84); Amsterdam, Netherlands
- Education: University of Vienna
- Known for: Leading theorist of orthodox Marxism
- Notable work: Editor of Die Neue Zeit (1883–1917); Erfurt Program (1891); The Class Struggle (Erfurt Program) (1892); The Road to Power (1909); The Dictatorship of the Proletariat (1918)
- Political party: Social Democratic Party of Austria (1875–1880); Social Democratic Party of Germany (1880–1917; 1922–1938); Independent Social Democratic Party of Germany (1917–1922)
- Movement: Marxism; Social democracy; Democratic socialism
- Spouses: Louise Strasser (m. 1883; div. 1889); Luise Ronsperger (m. 1890)
- Children: 3
- Parents: Johann Kautsky; Minna Kautsky

Karl Johann Kautsky (/ˈkaʊtski/; German: [ˈkaʊtski]; 16 October 1854 – 17 October 1938) was an Austrian-born Marxist theorist. One of the most authoritative promulgators of orthodox Marxism, he was for decades the leading theorist of the Social Democratic Party of Germany (SPD) and the Second International. His influence was so pervasive that he was often called the "Pope of Marxism", with his views remaining dominant until the outbreak of World War I in 1914. His influence extended beyond Germany, shaping the development of Marxism in the Russian Empire, where he was seen by figures like Vladimir Lenin as the leading authority on Marxist theory.

Born in Prague and educated in Vienna, Kautsky became a Marxist in the early 1880s while in exile in Zurich. He founded the journal Die Neue Zeit in 1883 and was its editor for 35 years. From 1885 to 1890, he lived in London, where he became a close friend of Friedrich Engels. Following the repeal of Germany's Anti-Socialist Laws, he authored the theoretical section of the SPD's 1891 Erfurt Program. His commentary on the program, The Class Struggle, became a popular and widely circulated summary of Marxism. Kautsky's theoretical framework reinterpreted Karl Marx's critique of political economy into a doctrine of historical-empirical laws predicting the inevitable concentration of capital, polarisation of society, and immiseration of the working class.

Kautsky's orthodox Marxism advocated a gradualist, evolutionary approach to socialism. He argued that a socialist revolution was inevitable but could not be forced prematurely. The role of a socialist party was to organise the working class, win political reforms, and improve workers' lives through the institutions of bourgeois parliamentary democracy, until material conditions were ripe for the transition to socialism. This "centrist" stance, positioned between reformism and revolutionary radicalism, drew him into major conflicts. He defended Marxist orthodoxy against the revisionism of Eduard Bernstein, and opposed the revolutionary spontaneity advocated by Rosa Luxemburg.

Kautsky's pre-war influence collapsed after 1914. He opposed the SPD's decision to support the German war effort, which led him to break with the party and co-found the anti-war Independent Social Democratic Party of Germany (USPD) in 1917. After the war, he became a prominent critic of the October Revolution, denouncing it as a premature coup that had established a new form of dictatorship. He argued that the Bolsheviks' methods had betrayed the democratic principles he saw as essential to socialism. He rejoined the SPD in 1922 but his influence steadily declined. He fled to Amsterdam after the 1938 Anschluss of Austria, and died there the same year. Vilified by Leninists as a "renegade", Kautsky is seen by others as a consistent proponent of democratic socialism whose work continues to influence modern currents.

== Early life ==
=== Family and background ===
Karl Kautsky was born in Prague on 16 October 1854, then part of the Austrian Empire. His parents were Johann Kautsky, a Czech theatrical scene designer, and Minna Jaich, an Austrian actress and writer of Czech descent. The family moved to Vienna when Kautsky was seven years old in 1863. Despite Kautsky's later efforts in his memoirs to suggest a vague proletarian background, his immediate family was not working class. Though his parents faced some financial difficulties in their early married years, they had family connections to rely on. By the time Karl was six, his father provided a comfortable income, allowing for at least two servants. Karl was the eldest of four children, followed by Minna (b. 1856), Fritz (b. 1857), and Johann (b. 1864).

Kautsky maintained a particularly close intellectual relationship with his mother, Minna. She came from a family of actors and theatrical artists and, freed from household duties by the family's improved finances after 1860, turned to intellectual pursuits. She and Karl developed a shared interest in contemporary philosophy and natural science. When Karl received Ernst Haeckel's The History of Creation in 1874, they studied it together. Later, when Kautsky began writing his first socialist pieces, he would show them to his mother for advice. Minna Kautsky herself became a socialist writer, gaining a minor reputation for her romantic socialist fiction even before her son's work was known, and was admired by Friedrich Engels.

A common misconception, noted by Steenson, is that Kautsky was Jewish; he was not. His second wife, Luise Ronsperger, was Jewish, and their sons faced persecution under the Nazis, which may have contributed to this confusion.

=== Education and early influences ===
Kautsky was an avid reader from a young age. He was tutored at home until he was nine. In 1864, he began attending the Melk seminary, run by Benedictine monks, which he found oppressive. From 1866 to 1874, he attended the more progressive Academic Gymnasium in Vienna, where he studied religion, Latin, Greek, German, geography, history, mathematics, natural history, and philosophy. He was a mediocre student, partly due to chronic illness, poor eyesight, and a distrust of his teachers. His studies were also affected by his growing interest in extracurricular matters, such as the Paris Commune in 1871. He performed best in history and philosophy.

In the autumn of 1874, Kautsky entered the University of Vienna, intending to study "historical philosophy" to become a university lecturer or a middle-school teacher. He took courses in psychology, history, physical geography, and literature. A brief attempt to study law was abandoned due to illness and a self-professed lack of oratorical skill. He ultimately attended nine semesters but never took a degree, his growing socialist activities turning him away from academia. Kautsky himself felt he learned little at university due to conflicts with professors, believing that socialists were largely self-taught. Friedrich Engels later criticized Kautsky's university training for instilling a "frightful mass of nonsense" and a tendency towards hasty judgment, though he acknowledged Kautsky's efforts to unlearn these habits. However, Steenson argues that Kautsky's broad and somewhat unstructured university studies fostered his eclectic intellectual tastes, which suited him for his later role in popularizing Marxism.

During his university years, Kautsky briefly considered careers in art, like his father, and playwriting. He had written creatively from his seminary years. Inspired by his father's successful stage adaptation of Jules Verne's Around the World in Eighty Days, Karl wrote a scientific fantasy play, The Atlantic-Pacific Company, about the construction of a Panama-Nicaragua canal. It had limited success in Vienna, Graz, and Berlin in 1877–1878. Its failure, coupled with his increasing involvement in the socialist movement, led him to abandon playwriting.

== Entry into socialism ==
Kautsky's immediate family was largely apolitical, though there was a sporadic Czech nationalism, a sympathy Karl initially shared. His political consciousness began to emerge in the summer of 1868 after a visit to rural Bohemia, where he was impressed by Czech nationalist sentiments and peasant agitation. For the next two years, he considered himself an "outspoken Czech nationalist", influenced by figures like František Palacký, who combined romantic nationalism with political liberalism. This Czech nationalism, however, did not last long in the predominantly German environment of Vienna.

Two events in early 1871 profoundly shaped Kautsky's radicalization: the Paris Commune and his reading of George Sand's romantic socialist novel, The Sin of M. Antoine. The Commune fired his imagination, stirred his sympathies for the working class, and pushed his political radicalism towards socialism. Sand's novel, which he reread many times, provided crucial emotional support during a period of isolation and family disapproval of his socialist leanings. It reinforced his ethical commitment to the oppressed and suggested that the coming of socialism would require a long process of study and development. Other early socialist influences included the historical works of Louis Blanc. By late 1871, Kautsky's Czech nationalism had evolved into a vaguely socialist, democratic radicalism. In 1873–1874, he wrote unpublished articles and stories seeking to reconcile capital and labor through education, equality, and worker cooperatives, advocating for a federal republic with extensive freedoms.

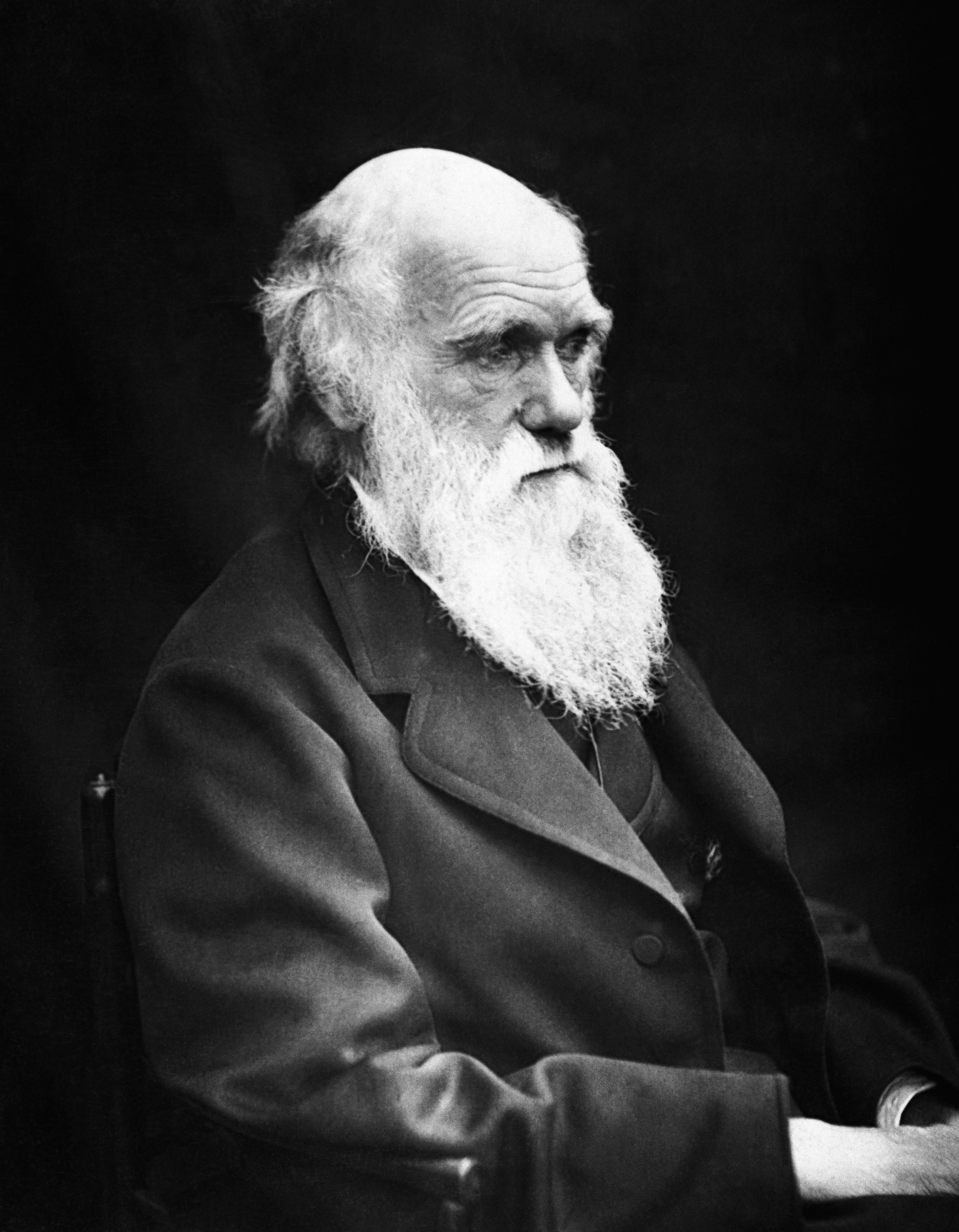
Charles Darwin

Around this time, Kautsky came under the influence of positivism, materialism, and the scientific thought of the era, particularly the works of Charles Darwin, Ernst Haeckel, Ludwig Büchner, and Henry Thomas Buckle. Darwin's work, especially its elimination of a deity from explanations of origins, was crucial in shaping Kautsky's natural-scientific and anti-Christian worldview. Darwin's Descent of Man was particularly significant, as its explanation for the non-supernatural origin of human ethics was, in Kautsky's words, a "revelation" that removed one of the last hindrances to his adoption of materialism. He was impressed by Haeckel's attempts to apply natural science to human society, though he rejected Haeckel's racism and cruder forms of Social Darwinism. Büchner's monistic view of the world and near-socialist positions also appealed to him. Buckle's History of Civilization in England initially suggested a materialist outlook but ultimately emphasized the role of intellectual factors, a contradiction Kautsky would later address more consistently.

=== Austrian socialist movement and early writings ===
At around the age of twenty, Kautsky became active in the Austrian socialist movement and began writing for its journals. He joined the small Austrian Social Democratic Workers' Party (SPÖ) in January 1875. The party, founded in 1874, was weak due to Austria's limited industrialization, economic depression, and internal divisions along national and tactical lines. Kautsky aligned himself with the radical faction led by Andreas Scheu and became a propagandist and lecturer, primarily on historical topics. His frustration with the party's impotence and state repression led to a brief flirtation with anarchist ideas.

His earliest published works appeared primarily in German socialist journals like Der Volksstaat (later Vorwärts) and Austrian socialist papers. These articles focused on natural science and its relation to socialism, and on Austrian political developments. A key early work was "Socialism and the Struggle for Existence" (1876), in which he critiqued anti-socialist interpretations of Darwinism, arguing that solidarity, not just individual struggle, was a factor in evolution and human society. These early writings still showed strong romantic and idealist influences, with Kautsky's commitment to socialism being primarily moral. His first book, Der Einfluss der Volksvermehrung auf den Fortschritt der Gesellschaft (The Influence of Population Increase on the Progress of Society, 1880), was a critique of the Malthusian view of overpopulation. In this pre-Marxist phase, Kautsky's theory of history was, by his own account, "nothing other than the application of Darwinism to social development", focused on the struggle for existence between different tribes, peoples, and races. Steenson notes that by 1885, Kautsky had clearly broken with the idea that natural laws could be directly applied to human society, emphasizing instead the historical specificity of social laws.

Kautsky first read Karl Marx's Capital in 1875, but its influence was not immediately apparent in his writings. A more significant turning point was his encounter with Friedrich Engels's Anti-Dühring, which was serialized in Vorwärts from 1877 to 1878. Though Kautsky did not thoroughly study it until 1880 with Eduard Bernstein, its ideas began to appear in his work by spring 1878, marking a shift towards a greater awareness of economic factors and Marxian analysis. In 1879, through the wealthy German socialist Karl Höchberg, Kautsky was offered a subsidized position among exiled German socialists in Zurich, Switzerland. This offer, contingent on abandoning his quasi-anarchist sympathies, provided a market for his socialist writings and removed him from the increasingly anarchist-dominated Austrian socialist environment. He arrived in Zurich in January 1880.

== Theoretician of German social democracy ==
=== Zurich and London exile (1880s) ===
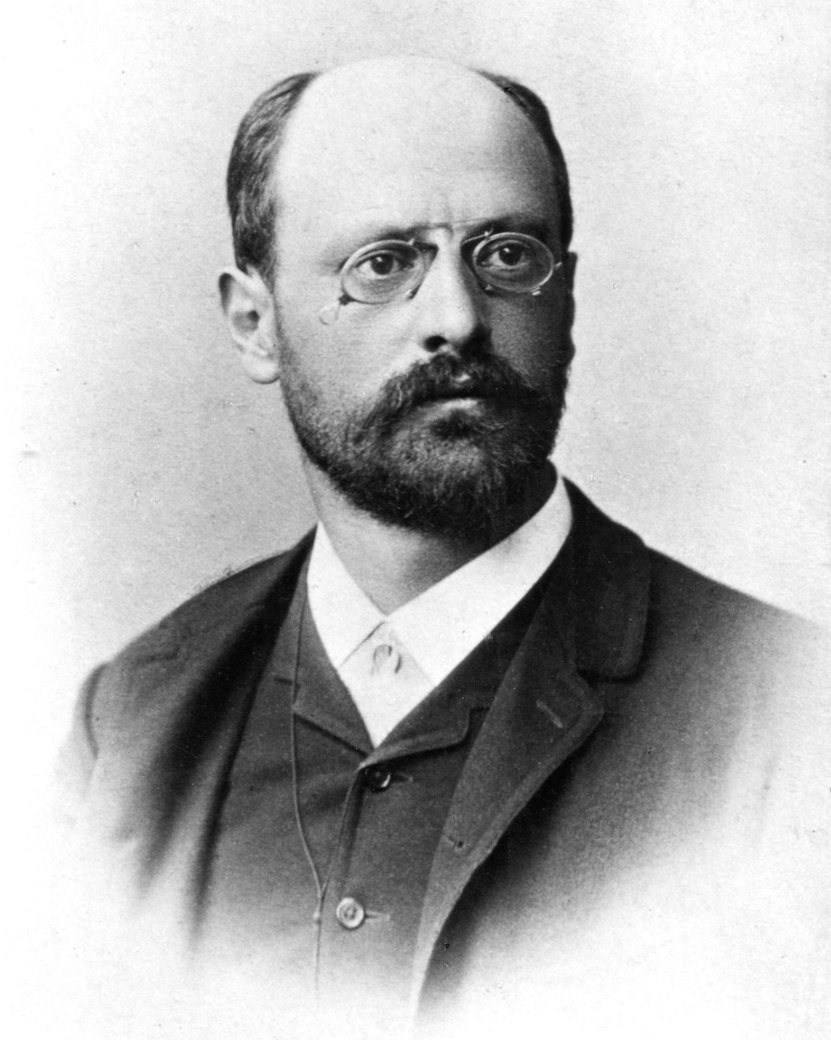
Kautsky in 1882

The decade of the 1880s was pivotal for Kautsky, both personally and intellectually. During the Anti-Socialist Laws in Germany, he moved frequently between Zurich (1880–1882, 1884), Vienna (1882–1883, 1888–1889), Stuttgart (1883), and London (1885–1888, 1889–1890), before settling in Stuttgart in late 1890. In this period, he developed a radical outlook, denouncing the bureaucratic-military state, viewing parliament as a tool for agitation, and promoting a "mystique" of the party as a new ecclesia militans (church militant).

In Zurich, Kautsky lived independently for the first time, supported by Höchberg. He became part of the German socialist émigré circle and earned the nickname "Baron Juchzer" for his somewhat fastidious dress and ebullient optimism. Höchberg acted as his first serious editor and introduced him to the work of Herbert Spencer and practical economics. Most importantly, Kautsky formed a close friendship and intellectual partnership with Eduard Bernstein. Together, they undertook an intense study of Engels's Anti-Dühring, which cemented their conversion to Marxism. Bernstein, with his party experience, also tutored Kautsky in the practicalities of the German movement.

In February 1881, writing in Der Sozialdemokrat, the official newspaper of the Social Democratic Party of Germany (SPD) published in exile, he affirmed the necessity of a violent revolution in which violence would act as the "midwife of every old society pregnant with a new one". He argued that while a party could not create a revolution, it must organize itself for the revolution and "take advantage of it". He saw the SPD's role as guiding the masses and giving the revolution direction. In a December 1881 article, he argued that the first step of the revolution would be to "demolish the bourgeois state" and create a new one. The victorious proletariat, he wrote, would need a government to "curb the ruled with all the means at its command. All this may sound very undemocratic, but necessity will compel us to act in this way".

Kautsky first visited Marx and Engels in London from March to June 1881. While Marx was unimpressed, viewing Kautsky as a "mediocrity", Engels recognized his eagerness and potential. Kautsky was briefly considered as editor for Der Sozialdemokrat, but August Bebel and Engels ultimately found Bernstein more suitable for the political demands of the role, deeming Kautsky better suited for theoretical work.

=== Die Neue Zeit ===
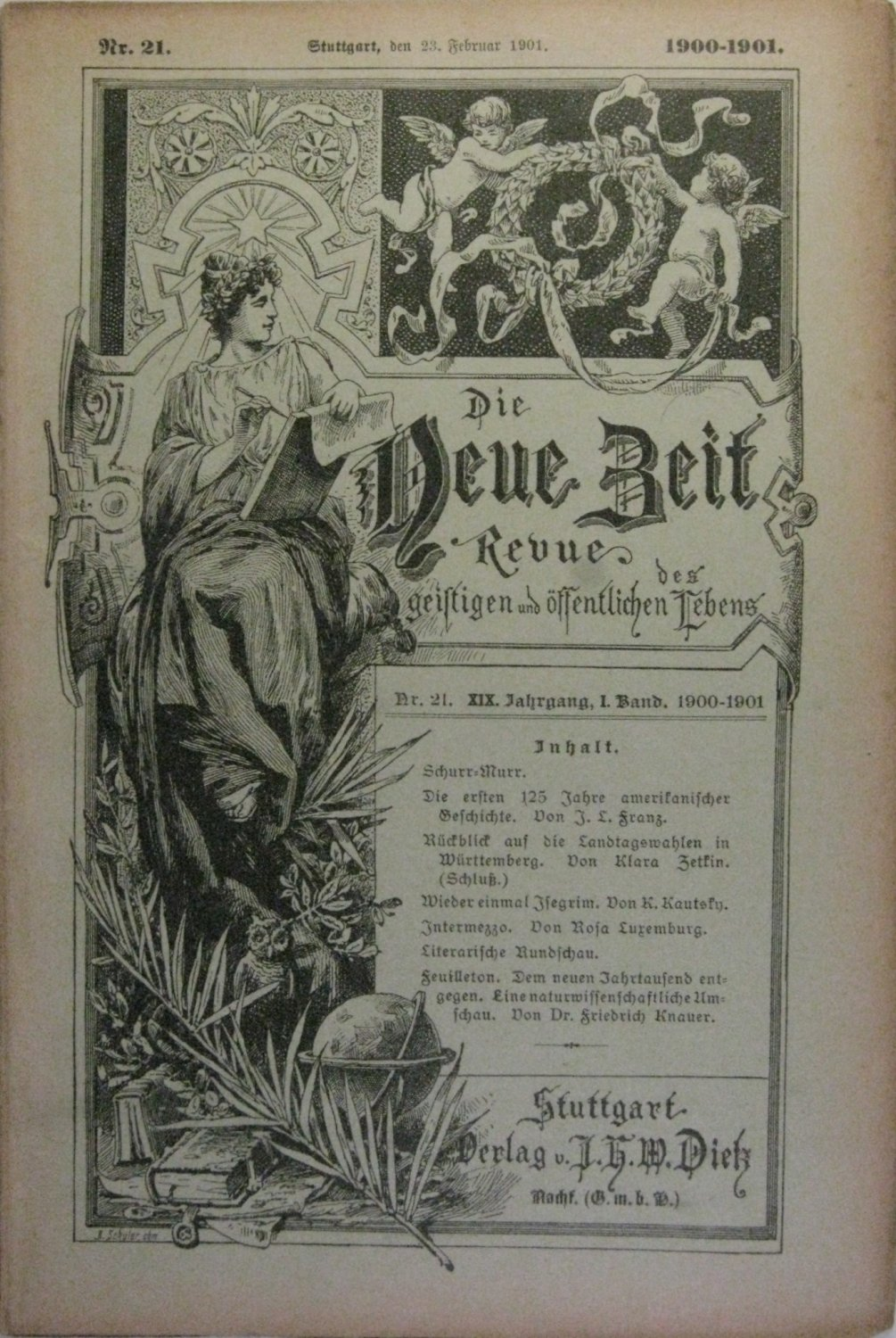
Cover of a 1901 issue of Die Neue Zeit

In 1883, Kautsky founded and became the primary editor of Die Neue Zeit (The New Age), a Marxist theoretical journal published by Johann Heinrich Wilhelm Dietz in Stuttgart. This provided Kautsky with a regular income and a crucial platform for developing and promoting his brand of Marxism. The journal was intended as an organ of scientific socialism, with Marx and Darwin as its "twin pillars". In a letter to Engels asking him to contribute to the first issue, Kautsky wrote: "I cannot think of a better introductory article ... than one about Darwin. The name alone is already a program." According to its first editorial, its objectives were the "democratization of science as an instrument for the socialist elevation of the proletariat", party commitment, and devotion to truth. Wilhelm Liebknecht was a designated permanent contributor, and the editorial board initially comprised Dietz, Liebknecht, and Kautsky. Kautsky remained its editor until 1917. Under his editorship, it became the most prestigious of all international Marxist journals, creating his national and international reputation as an expounder of Marx. The journal's influence extended to the Russian Empire, where it was the most popular Marxist publication, seen as a crucial source of theory for Russian Social Democrats.

The early years of Die Neue Zeit were marked by Kautsky's financial struggles and conflicts over editorial control, particularly with Wilhelm Blos and Bruno Geiser, who were installed by Dietz during Kautsky's brief return to Zurich in 1884. Kautsky, with crucial support from Bebel, successfully resisted attempts by the moderate wing of the SPD to dilute the journal's Marxist orientation. From 1885 to 1888, Kautsky edited Die Neue Zeit from London, benefiting from close collaboration with Engels and the resources of the British Museum. This was a highly productive period for him. A key early theoretical debate published in the journal was Kautsky's (Engels-guided) critique of the state socialist ideas of Karl Rodbertus in 1884–1885, aimed at countering its appeal within the German socialist movement. In 1894–1895, the journal's status was the subject of a major internal party debate. To ensure it could continue providing an income for key party intellectuals like Bernstein and Franz Mehring, Bebel overruled Kautsky's desire to convert it from a weekly back to a monthly, a decision that highlighted the journal's practical role in subsidizing the movement's theorists.

=== Erfurt Program ===
Kautsky played a central role in drafting the new party program for the SPD after the lapse of the Anti-Socialist Laws in 1890. The previous Gotha Program of 1875 was considered outdated. In January 1891, Engels sent Kautsky Marx's previously unpublished Critique of the Gotha Program, which Kautsky then published in Die Neue Zeit. This created considerable controversy within the SPD leadership, particularly with Wilhelm Liebknecht and Dietz, due to its harsh criticism of the 1875 program and of Ferdinand Lassalle. Despite the storm, Kautsky's draft for the new program, which emphasized orthodox Marxist principles, was largely accepted by the party commission at the Erfurt Congress in October 1891, winning out over a rival draft prepared primarily by Liebknecht. He was entrusted with writing the theoretical section, which outlined the long-term goals of social polarization and the socialization of the means of production, while Bernstein wrote the "minimum programme" of short-term demands. Although Bebel's support ensured the acceptance of Kautsky's draft, he also pushed for changes, such as a clause for the free administration of justice. Kautsky, in turn, successfully led the opposition to Bebel's desire to include the Lassallean phrase "one reactionary mass" to describe all non-socialist parties. The Erfurt Program was the first party platform based strictly on Marxist principles. The program served as a compromise, reconciling the revolutionary sentiment engendered by the years of persecution with the need for a reformist tactic in a fundamentally non-revolutionary period.

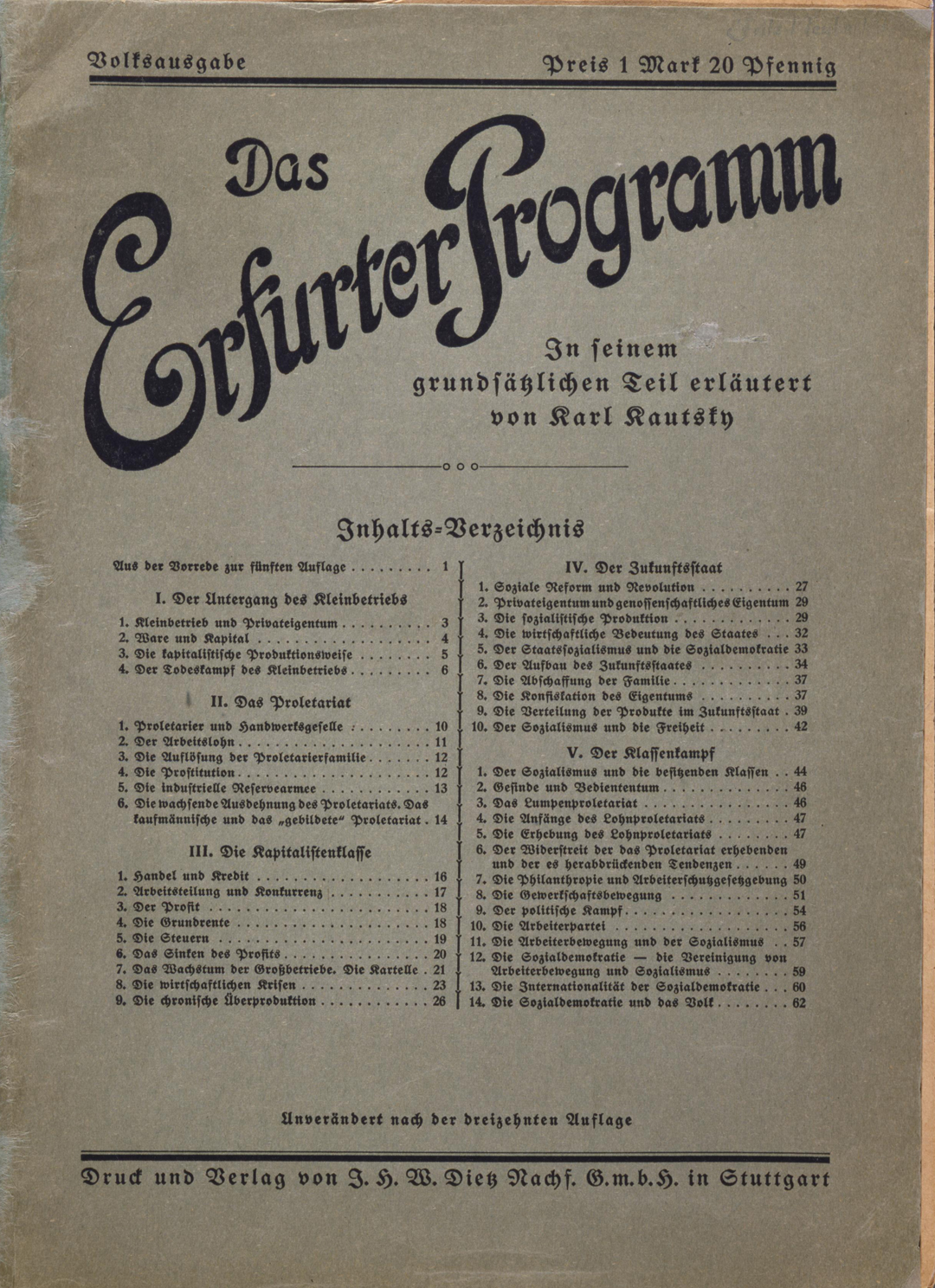
Cover of a 1904 pamphlet version of The Class Struggle (Erfurt Program)

Following the congress, Kautsky was commissioned by the party's central committee to write a pamphlet explaining and amplifying the program. This resulted in Das Erfurter Programm (1892, translated as The Class Struggle), which became his most famous and widely translated work, establishing him as a leading interpreter of Marxism. In it, Kautsky outlined the origins of modern capitalism, the role of human action in history, the nature of the future socialist state (though he was reluctant to offer detailed plans), and the tactics of the working-class movement, emphasizing party purity, political participation, and the inevitability of revolution. He argued that modern parliamentarism was indispensable for governing a large modern state and that a genuine parliamentary republic could serve as an instrument for the "dictatorship of the proletariat" as much as for the dictatorship of the bourgeoisie. He attacked concepts like direct legislation as unworkable and expressions of political sterility rooted in petty-bourgeois individualism. His commentary was seen by a generation of Marxists, including Vladimir Lenin, as the authoritative definition of social democracy. Lenin, who translated it into Russian in 1894, saw Kautsky's program as the "New Testament" of Marxism, a confirmation of the predictions made in the "Old Testament" of the Communist Manifesto.

=== The peasant question ===
A major tactical and theoretical issue for the SPD in the 1890s was its approach to the peasantry. While some, particularly in South Germany led by Georg von Vollmar, advocated for an agrarian program to win peasant votes, Kautsky was consistently skeptical. He had argued since the 1870s that peasants' attachment to private property and their individualism made them unlikely allies for a socialist party. He saw an inevitable conflict between the urban worker and the peasant; for instance, protecting peasant smallholdings meant higher food prices for urban consumers. For Kautsky, the best the party could do was to "neutralise" the peasantry, as it could never be a reliable socialist ally.

At the SPD's Frankfurt Congress in 1894, a resolution was passed calling for an agrarian program. Kautsky opposed this, arguing that specific appeals to peasants would dilute the party's proletarian character and contradict its class-struggle basis. He was particularly irritated by the "antitheoretical posture" of many of the program's proponents. He maintained that most of the rural population was, or was becoming, a rural proletariat. He believed land, as a primary means of production, must ultimately be socialized. At the Breslau Congress in 1895, Kautsky's resolution rejecting the proposed agrarian program was passed by 158 votes to 63, despite opposition from Bebel on this specific issue. In a stirring speech, Kautsky's ally Clara Zetkin called on the party to "hold firmly to the revolutionary character of our party". He further developed these ideas in his major work Die Agrarfrage (The Agrarian Question, 1899). This work, praised by Lenin as the most significant contribution to economic literature since Capital, systematically argued for the superiority of large-scale agriculture and posited that the party's task was to win over the agricultural proletariat and neutralize the small peasants, not to preserve their doomed form of production.

=== Revisionism debate ===
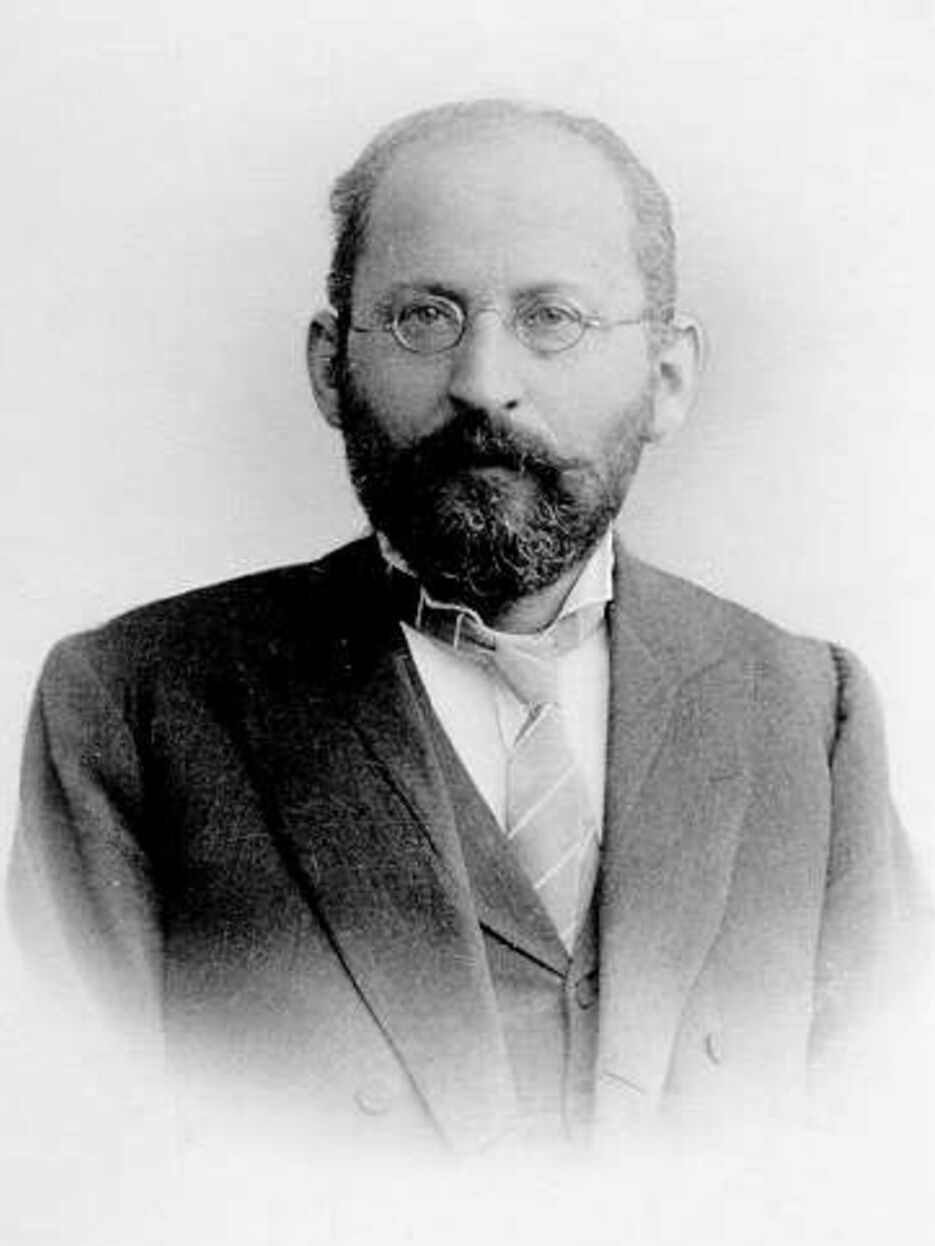
Eduard Bernstein

The most significant challenge to Kautsky's orthodox Marxism in this period came from his former close friend, Eduard Bernstein. Starting in 1896, Bernstein published a series of articles in Die Neue Zeit titled "Problems of Socialism", which questioned fundamental tenets of Marxism, including the theory of value, the inevitability of capitalist collapse, the intensification of class struggle, and the need for a purely proletarian revolutionary party. Bernstein advocated for an evolutionary, ethical socialism, famously stating, "the goal is nothing, the movement everything".

Kautsky was initially reluctant to publicly criticize Bernstein, due to their long friendship and Bernstein's exile. He first defended Bernstein against attacks by figures like Ernest Belfort Bax. However, as Bernstein's views became more explicit, particularly with the publication of Evolutionary Socialism (Die Voraussetzungen des Sozialismus und die Aufgaben der Sozialdemokratie) in 1899, Kautsky, urged by Bebel, felt compelled to respond. He was pushed into assuming the role of "defender of the faith" partly by Russian orthodox Marxists like Georgi Plekhanov, for whom Bernstein's theories were a particularly sensitive issue. The debate was centred on the empirical validity of Marx's prognosis of increasing capital centralisation and proletarianisation. Both agreed that if Marx's prognosis was invalid, the revolutionary perspective would lose its scientific basis.

In his classic defence of Marxist theory, Bernstein and the Social Democratic Programme (1899), Kautsky argued that Bernstein's analysis, based on observations of England, was not applicable to Germany, where no significant democratic forces existed outside the working class. For Kautsky, theory (orthodox Marxism) served a practical function: it provided the German workers with self-confidence and the certainty of victory. He contended that while capitalism was not mechanically collapsing (refuting the "collapse theory" Bernstein attributed to him), its contradictions were sharpening, particularly with the rise of finance capital and cartels, which increased social misery even if absolute poverty did not. He also developed his concept of Verelendung (immiserization), arguing that even if workers' material conditions improved, their share of the national wealth declined and social and political assaults by the ruling class would intensify class struggle. His objective was to keep the party "armed for every eventuality", maintaining a flexible tactic that could reckon "with crisis as with prosperity, with reaction as with revolution, with catastrophes as with slow peaceful development." The SPD officially condemned revisionism at its Hanover (1899) and Dresden (1903) congresses. The debate permanently damaged Kautsky's friendship with Bernstein. Kautsky later came to view revisionism as a "renaissance of bourgeois radicalism" linked to the decline of the petty bourgeoisie, and privately urged Bernstein to break with the SPD and form a new left-bourgeois party.

Kautsky also engaged in tactical debates concerning cooperation with bourgeois parties. He opposed participation in the Prussian Landtag elections under the restrictive three-class franchise in 1893 but argued in favor of it by 1897 to weaken the Junkers and fight for democratic reforms. He supported Jean Jaurès's engagement in the Dreyfus Affair but condemned Alexandre Millerand's entry into a bourgeois French government, seeing it as an unnecessary compromise. At the Second International's Paris Congress in 1900, Kautsky's resolution, which opposed electoral alliances but allowed for socialist entry into bourgeois governments under extraordinary circumstances (such as a Russian invasion of Germany) with party approval, was adopted.

== "Classical years" and challenges (1905–1914) ==
=== Russian Revolution of 1905 and mass strike debate ===
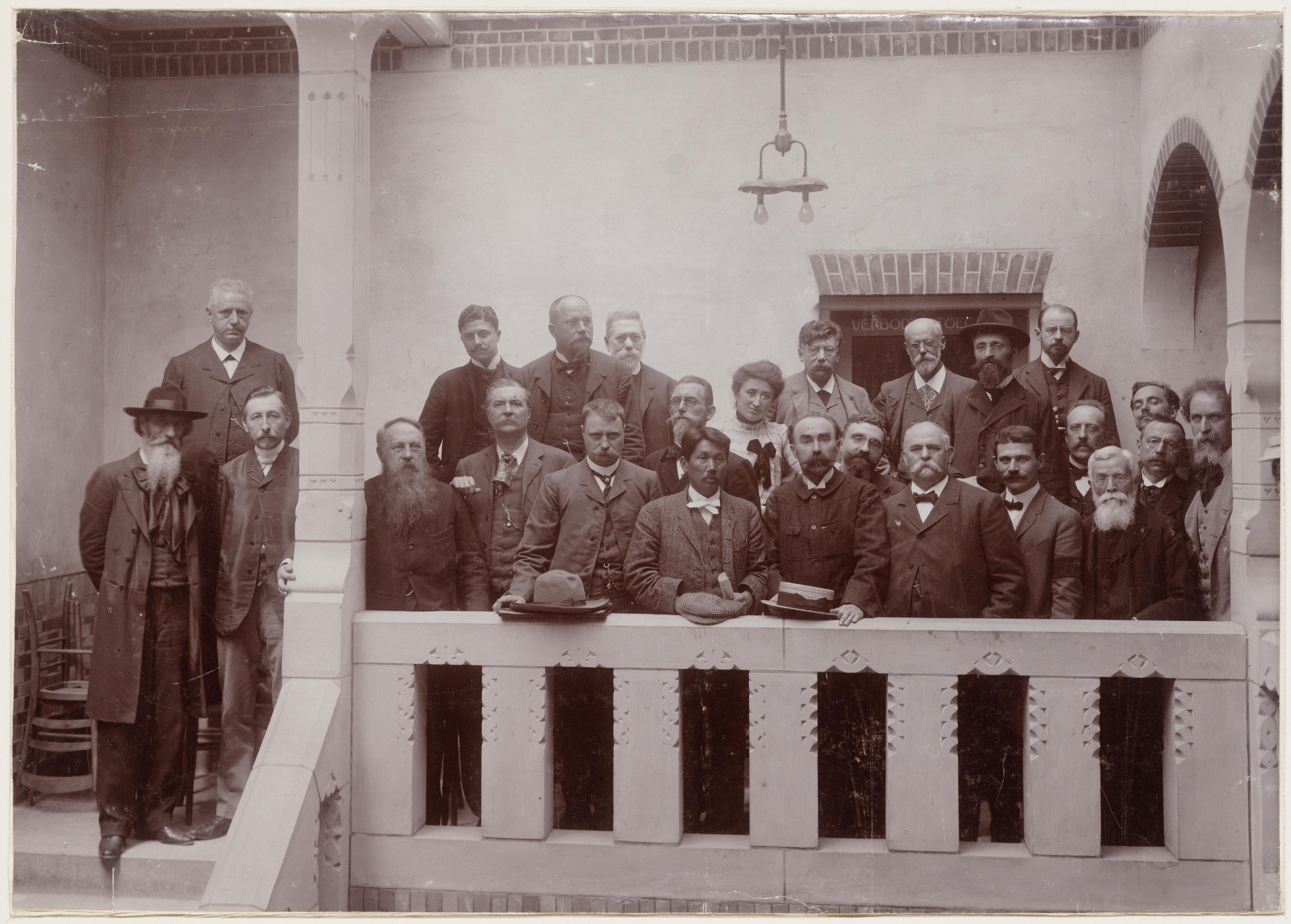
Kautsky (back row, third from right) at the Amsterdam Congress of the Second International, 1904

The Russian Revolution of 1905 significantly impacted European socialists, particularly in Germany, by highlighting the potential of the mass strike. Kautsky had paid some attention to Russia before, viewing it as backward but ripe for a bourgeois revolution. He had close ties with Russian Marxists like Pavel Axelrod, Georgi Plekhanov, and Rosa Luxemburg, and was seen as an arbiter in their factional disputes. When the revolution broke out, Kautsky was one of the first Western Marxists to analyze its significance, arguing that Russia was now the "torch-bearer of revolution" for the world, and that the East was opening the revolutionary road for the West at the "beginning of the era of proletarian revolutions". He saw the revolution as a democratic, not socialist, process, driven by the proletariat. Kautsky supported the revolutionaries and argued that the Russian peasantry, unlike Germany's, had revolutionary potential. He believed a worker-peasant coalition could achieve a liberal, capitalist Russia, which would then eventually lead to socialism.

The 1905 revolution, coupled with a surge in strike activity in Germany, fueled a major debate within the SPD on the mass strike. Trade union leaders, concerned about costs and employer retaliation, were cautious. The SPD leadership, increasingly conservative, also resisted adopting the mass strike. However, the party's radical intellectual wing, including Luxemburg and Karl Liebknecht, saw it as a way to vitalize the party and achieve democratic reforms. Kautsky's position was nuanced. He had long considered the general strike a potentially useful, if dangerous, weapon. He argued that the growing interest in the mass strike was a response to the "growing disdain for parliamentarism" following the SPD's 1903 electoral victory, which had not translated into significant political change. He drew radical conclusions from the 1905 Ruhr coal strike, arguing that the employers' power was so great that "it can no longer be assailed by pure trade-union means" and that a political orientation was now necessary. He urged discussion of the mass strike not because he was eager to use it, but to ensure it was understood and not misused. He believed that in Germany, a successful mass strike was "only conceivable in a revolutionary situation".

The SPD's Jena Congress in 1905 passed a Bebel-sponsored resolution that ambiguously accepted the mass strike as a defensive tactic and affirmed party superiority over trade unions. However, a secret agreement in February 1906 between party and trade union leaders effectively curtailed any organized mass action by the SPD, as the party accepted fiscal responsibility for political strikes it could not afford. At the Mannheim Congress in 1906, this agreement was essentially ratified, despite Kautsky's and Luxemburg's opposition. In a failed attempt to subordinate the unions to the party, Kautsky proposed an amendment declaring it the "duty of every party comrade ... to feel bound by the decisions of the party congresses in his trade-union activity." The defeat of his amendment represented a major victory for the trade-union leadership and a reversal of the radicals' gains from the previous year.

After the defeat of the 1905 revolution, Kautsky's relationship with the Russian Marxists became increasingly strained by their constant factionalism. In 1910, he reluctantly agreed to act as a trustee, alongside Clara Zetkin and Franz Mehring, for the finances of the Russian Social Democratic Labour Party (RSDLP) in an attempt to enforce unity between the Bolshevik and Menshevik factions. The effort failed, entangling Kautsky in years of disputes over party funds and accusations from all sides. The experience deepened his disillusionment with the Russian émigré leadership, whom he chided for their "organisational particularism" and inability to put the interests of the movement above factional and personal quarrels.

=== Development of "centrism" ===
The mass strike debate and its outcome led Kautsky to develop what became known as his "centrist" position, attempting to find a "true" course between reformism on the right and radicalism on the left. He opposed both the reformist idea that socialism could be achieved by gradual reforms and the revolutionary theory that the party's main task was to prepare for a single violent upheaval. He believed that theory (Marxism) generated the necessary motivation for socialist action and that the party's main task was to prepare the workers for an inevitable, though not necessarily imminent, revolution by raising their consciousness and organizing them. He argued for a "strategy of attrition" (Ermattungsstrategie), where the party would win not by shock tactics but by outlasting the opposition through persistent aggressive political positioning. In this strategy, the party would use parliamentary struggles, street demonstrations, and strikes to gradually weaken its opponents and strengthen the proletariat, only engaging in a decisive battle when the enemy had been sufficiently worn down.

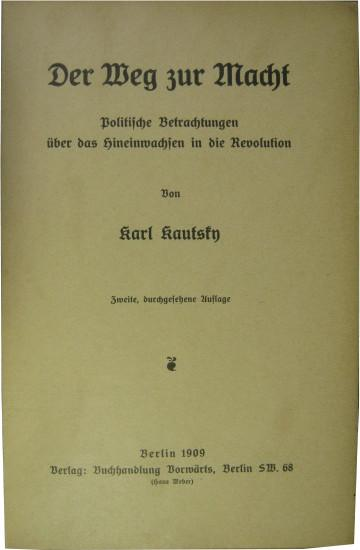
Title page of The Road to Power (1909)

In 1909, Kautsky published The Road to Power (Der Weg zur Macht), which he conceived of as a "complement" to his 1902 work The Social Revolution. In this book, he argued that a new "era of revolutions" was approaching due to the sharpening of class and international conflicts. He predicted "significant shifts in the relationship of forces in favour of the proletariat" and reiterated that the dictatorship of the proletariat was the "only form" of political power for the working class. Kautsky presented the revolution as an inevitable product of capitalist development which could not be artificially stimulated, assigning a passive role to the party: it must maintain its oppositional integrity while waiting for the ruling class to destroy itself through its inner contradictions. The work represented a return to the "Erfurt synthesis" and a theoretical proposal for a truce between the party's factions. The book's radical tone caused a stir within the SPD; the party leadership refused to publish it under the party's imprint, and revisionists threatened a split over its publication, viewing it as dangerously revolutionary. After the initial edition of 5,000 sold out quickly, the executive refused a second printing. With the help of his friend Clara Zetkin on the party's control commission, Kautsky forced the executive to relent.

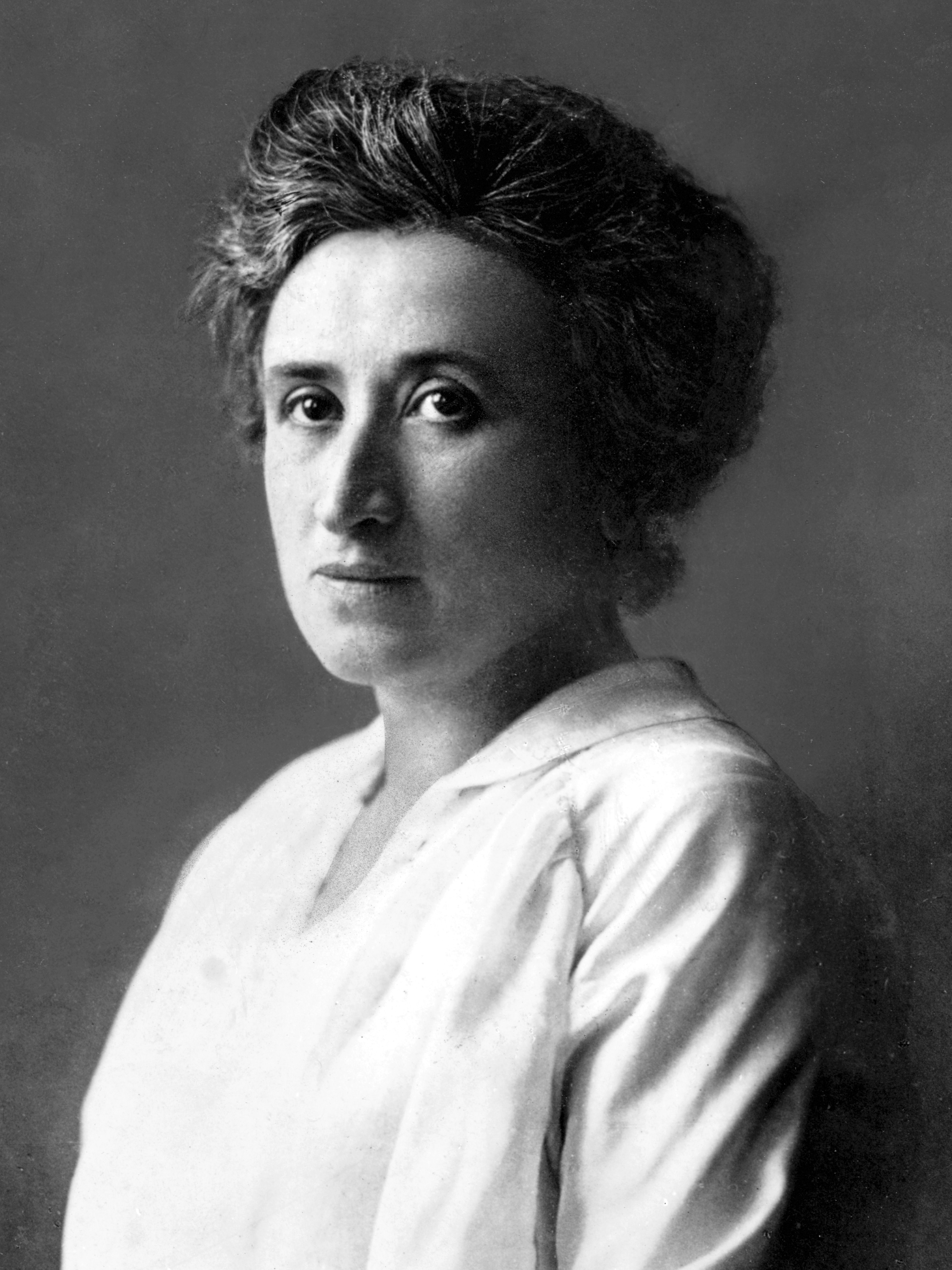
Rosa Luxemburg

This period saw a definitive break with Rosa Luxemburg. A debate in 1910 over franchise reform in Prussia, where Luxemburg supported mass action and Kautsky urged caution, escalated into a bitter personal and theoretical split after Kautsky refused to publish an article by Luxemburg advocating for a republic. Kautsky articulated his centrist stance in an article titled "Between Baden and Luxemburg" (August 1910), arguing that the party must navigate between the reformist compromises of the South German SPD (who had voted for the Baden state budget) and the putschist tendencies of Luxemburg. He characterized the SPD as a "revolutionary, not a revolution-making" party. He criticized Luxemburg for failing to grasp the specific conditions of Germany, where the state was far stronger than in Russia, making a "strategy of annihilation" (Niederwerfungsstrategie) suicidal.

=== Imperialism and the path to war ===
As imperialism and militarism intensified in Europe, Kautsky devoted considerable attention to these issues. He initially associated colonial expansion with commercial-capitalist and agrarian-aristocratic interests. Under the influence of J. A. Hobson and particularly Rudolf Hilferding's Finance Capital (1910), his views evolved. He saw imperialism and nationalism primarily as bourgeois capitalist phenomena used by the German government to strengthen itself against the workers.

Kautsky opposed any form of socialist colonial policy, viewing it as a contradiction in terms and inherently exploitative, brutalizing, and racist; this was a consistent theme from his 1907 pamphlet Socialism and Colonial Policy. At the Second International's Stuttgart Congress in 1907, he endorsed a minority report opposing imperialism while the majority of the German delegation took a more conservative stance. While he initially believed mature capitalism did not necessarily imply imperialism and militarism, by 1912 he accepted this connection. However, as the threat of war grew, his humanitarian aversion to war led him to seek ways to avoid it, arguing that the "armaments race is based on economic causes, but not on economic necessity". He theorized that imperialism was a specific policy of finance capital, not an inevitable economic stage of capitalism. According to this view, imperialism was one of several possible political responses to chronic overproduction, which Kautsky attributed to the faster rate of accumulation in industrial versus agrarian sectors. He conjectured that a future phase of "ultra-imperialism" was possible, in which international capitalist cartels would cooperate to exploit the world peacefully, superseding the violent competition of the imperialist phase. He believed that if war came, socialists should take an unpopular oppositional stance, which would ultimately position them to lead the revolution that would follow the war's inevitable collapse of capitalist society.

== World War I and party split ==
=== Opposition to the war ===
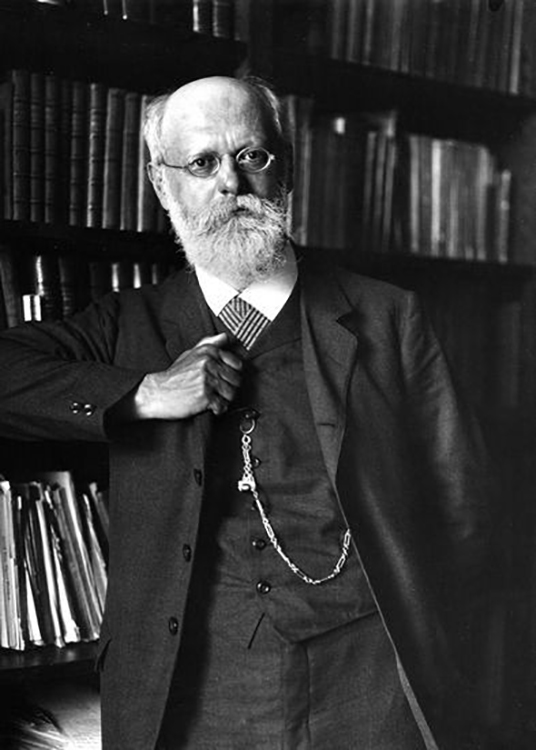
Kautsky in the 1910s

When World War I broke out in August 1914, Kautsky, though not a member of the SPD Fraktion (parliamentary group), was invited to its decisive meeting on war credits. He and Hugo Haase initially drafted a statement for refusing war credits. When it became clear that the majority would vote for credits, Kautsky urged abstention. Finally, when the Fraktion voted 78 to 14 for credit approval, he joined Gustav Hoch in an unsuccessful attempt to include a clause in the party's declaration demanding no annexations or violations of neutrality. Kautsky had lost, and the SPD accepted the Burgfrieden (civic truce).

Throughout the war, Kautsky's main concern was to maintain as much theoretical integrity as possible and to prevent the SPD from completely succumbing to nationalist war fever. He distinguished between the legitimate defense of a "national state" and the aggressive "nationalistic state", arguing that workers had a right to national self-defense but must reject chauvinism and imperialism. He strongly opposed the Burgfrieden and the imperialistic war aims increasingly adopted by the SPD majority.

Kautsky believed the Second International had not been destroyed by the war but that its true nature and limitations had been revealed. He argued that it was an instrument for peacetime, not for war, and that its task was now to "reconquer peace". He engaged in extensive polemics, primarily against the right-wing socialists (the Umlerner or "re-learners") who argued the party must change its theories to fit the new realities of war. Wartime censorship made it easier to criticize the right than the left. During the war, Kautsky re-established a close working relationship with Eduard Bernstein, who had also moved to an anti-war position. Conversely, his relationship with former collaborators like Heinrich Cunow, who became a leading proponent of war Marxism, deteriorated.

=== Founding of the USPD ===
As the war continued and the SPD majority increasingly suppressed dissent, Kautsky laid the theoretical groundwork for a party split. He argued that the majority's intolerance and violation of party custom by denying minority voices justified separation. In a series of articles in late 1915, he defended the right to dissent and warned that suppression bred extremism.

In April 1917, Kautsky, along with Bernstein, Haase, and other oppositionists, founded the Independent Social Democratic Party of Germany (USPD) at a congress in Gotha. He had initially headed a small group, which also included Bernstein and Emanuel Wurm, that vigorously opposed the establishment of a separate party, fearing it would strengthen the Spartacists. Kautsky wrote the party's manifesto, which called for an international, democratic peace with self-determination and blamed the SPD majority for the split. The new party was born divided, its common denominator being only opposition to the war. The split led to Kautsky's loss of the editorship of Die Neue Zeit. He continued to develop his views on nationalism and democracy, arguing in The Liberation of Nations (1917) that self-determination was essential for both international democracy and the proletarian struggle. He also refined his distinction between political and social revolution.

== Revolutions and post-war period ==
=== German Revolution ===
The German Revolution of 1918–1919 brought Kautsky into government service. He served as chairman of the Socialization Commission and as an advisor in the Foreign Office, tasked with publishing documents on war guilt. His work resulted in The Guilt of William Hohenzollern (1919). Kautsky advocated for a democratic republic and opposed the attempts by the extreme left (Spartacists) to establish a council-based (Räte) system, which he viewed as undemocratic and likely to lead to civil war. He believed the workers' councils had an important economic role in gradual socialization but were unsuitable as permanent political bodies. For Kautsky, only a National Assembly elected by universal suffrage could provide the legitimate foundation for a democratic state; councils, as class-based institutions, could not represent the whole nation and would lead to a minority dictatorship. His moderate stance and insistence on democratic processes put him at odds with the increasingly radicalized USPD, and he effectively broke with the party by mid-1919 when it endorsed the concept of a council dictatorship.

Kautsky's plan for socialization was gradualist, emphasizing orderly transition, compensation for expropriated property to maintain production, and adaptation to the technical development of different industries. He saw the state's role as facilitative rather than directly administrative in a socialized economy. His proposals included the dissolution of the standing army, the submission of the bureaucracy to a national assembly, and the devolution of police powers to municipalities.

=== Critique of the Russian Revolution and Bolshevism ===
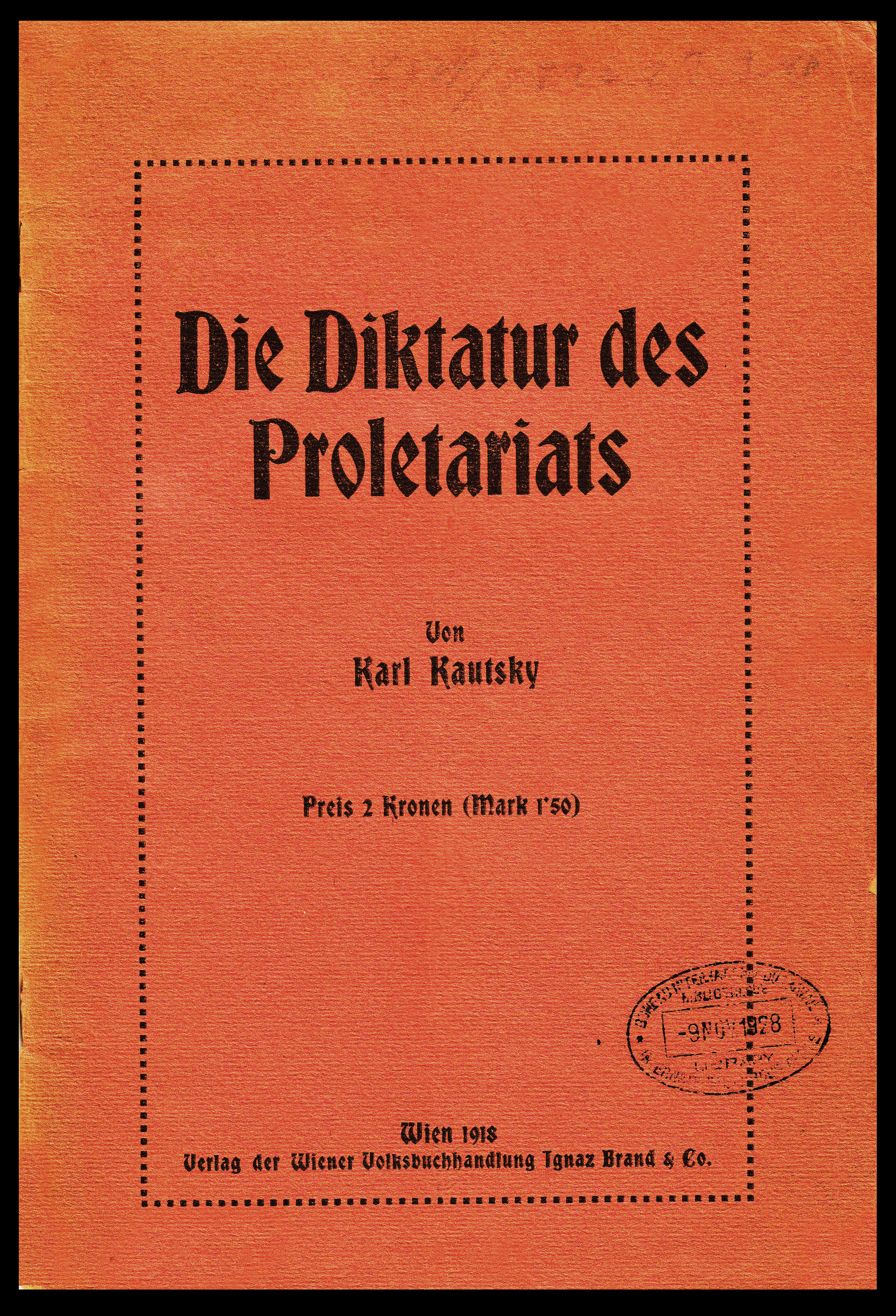
Cover of The Dictatorship of the Proletariat (1918)

Kautsky was an early and persistent critic of the Bolshevik Revolution. While he had seen Russia as ripe for a political (bourgeois-democratic) revolution, he argued that the conditions for a socialist revolution were absent. His critique stemmed from a lifelong commitment to democratic principles, which he saw as a precondition for socialism. His most comprehensive critique came in The Dictatorship of the Proletariat (1918). He argued that socialism's goal was the abolition of all exploitation and oppression, which required democracy, not a dictatorship of one faction of the proletariat over others and the peasantry. He contended that the Bolshevik reliance on will over objective conditions, their suppression of democratic forms like the Constituent Assembly in favor of soviets, and their violent methods would lead to an oppressive regime and ultimately fail. He argued that the Bolsheviks had perverted the Marxist concept of the dictatorship of the proletariat, which for Marx and Engels was a "state of fact" based on the democratic rule of a proletarian majority—as exemplified by the Paris Commune—not a "form of government" based on the suppression of democracy. Kautsky predicted that this "original sin of Bolshevism"—the abolition of elections and denial of freedom of speech and assembly—would give rise to a "new class of bureaucratic exploiters, no better than the Tsarist chinovniks".

This sparked a famous polemic with Lenin, whose The Proletarian Revolution and the Renegade Kautsky (1918) fiercely attacked Kautsky as a betrayer of Marxism. The theoretical disagreement extended to their views on democracy. Lenin accused Kautsky of a "formal" conception of democracy, arguing that bourgeois democracy was merely a façade for the class rule of the bourgeoisie. Kautsky, in turn, saw democracy as a principle that was alien to capitalism and could only be genuinely realised by the proletariat. Kautsky continued to criticize the Soviet regime throughout his life, developing a theory that Bolshevism was a new form of class society, a "state capitalism" ruled by a bureaucratic "new class", and that Stalinism was a form of "counter-revolution" worse than Bonapartism.

== Later years and exile (1920–1938) ==
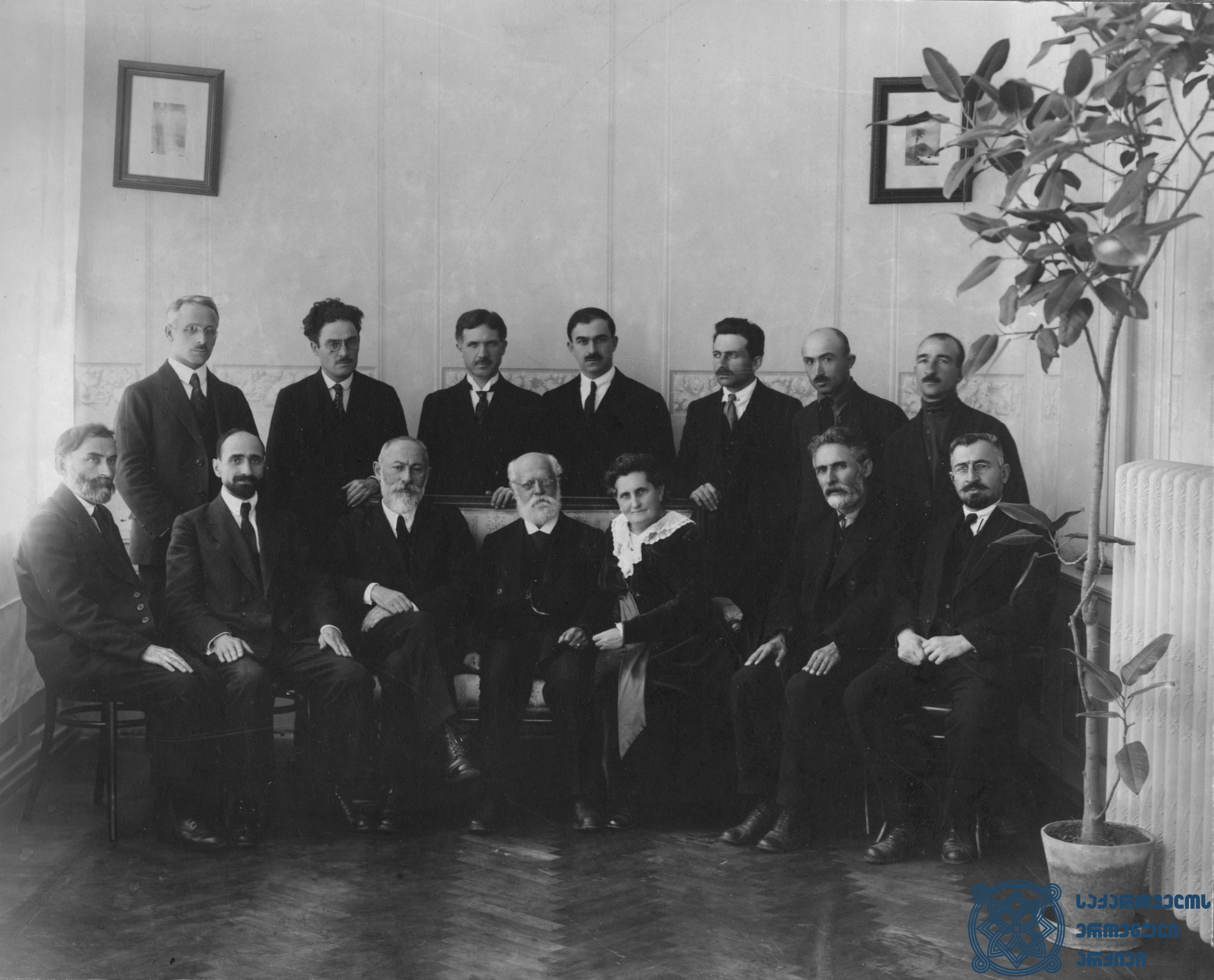
Kautsky and his wife Luise with Georgian Mensheviks in Tbilisi, 1920

After the USPD split in 1920, with the majority joining the Communist Party (KPD), Kautsky advocated for reunification of the remaining USPD members with the SPD, which occurred in 1922. He drafted the SPD's Heidelberg Program in 1925 but never felt at home in the increasingly reformist party of the Weimar Republic. In 1924, Kautsky moved to Vienna on the invitation of the Austrian Socialists, effectively retiring from active party politics. His concerns shifted to more abstract theorizing and continued criticism of Bolshevism. He urged Russian émigré opponents of Bolshevism, particularly Mensheviks, to unite and prepare for the communists' inevitable collapse. While he had little direct involvement in the Labour and Socialist International (LSI), he was an honored figure within it. He remained a highly respected figure among the exiled Mensheviks, and maintained a close correspondence with figures like Pavel Axelrod and Fyodor Dan, who saw him as their "only loyal and stout support in the international arena during the first two decades of Communist rule in Russia". Kautsky, in turn, felt a deep affection for the Russian socialists, telling Axelrod in 1924: "I have nowhere found such wonderful people as amongst the Russians, with so much warmth, so much theoretical interest, so much simple affection."

His magnum opus of this period was the two-volume Die materialistische Geschichtsauffassung (The Materialist Conception of History, 1927). In this work, Kautsky aimed to provide a systematic presentation of historical materialism, grounding it in the natural sciences but emphasizing the unique dialectical development of human society, driven by the interaction of human intellect (especially technology) and the environment. He reiterated his long-held view that the laws of nature and society were not directly interchangeable.

Kautsky struggled to understand the rise of fascism and Nazism, generally viewing them as counter-revolutionary phenomena born of post-revolutionary despair and the economic crisis, appealing to insecure petit bourgeois and peasant masses. He maintained an often-criticized "optimistic fatalism", believing in the ultimate triumph of reason and socialism. He argued that fascism was an "interlude" that could not last in developed industrial countries and that its violent methods were ultimately incompatible with the rational needs of modern capitalism. In Vienna, he witnessed the defeat of German socialism at the hands of Adolf Hitler and the annihilation of Austrian Social Democracy in the civil war of 1934.

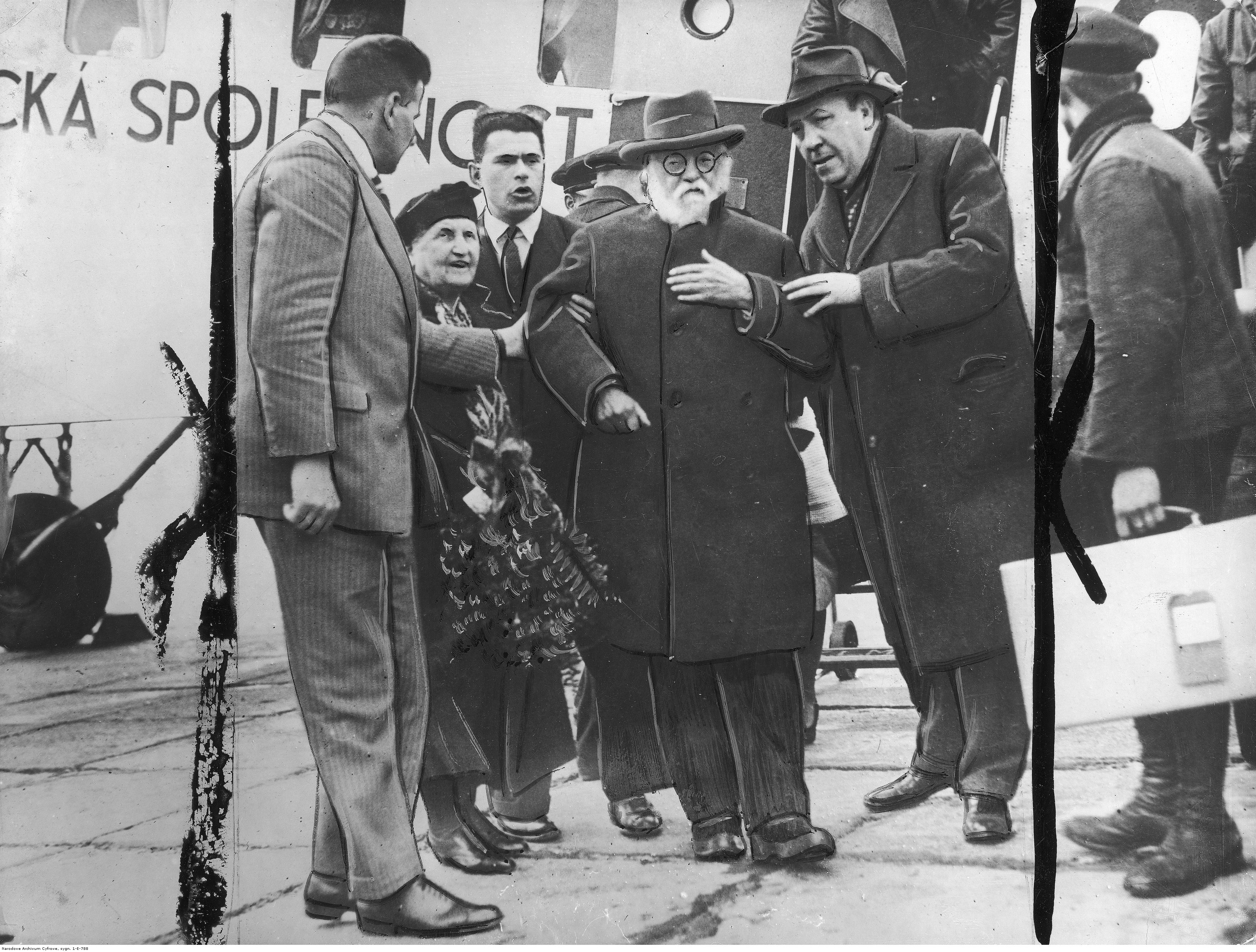
Kautsky and his wife disembark in Amsterdam after fleeing Vienna, 1938

Following the Anschluss in March 1938, Kautsky and his wife Luise, aided by the Czech embassy, fled Vienna by aeroplane for Amsterdam. Karl Kautsky died in Amsterdam on 17 October 1938, from complications of pancreatic cancer, one day after his 84th birthday. Several family members, including his wife Luise (who died in Auschwitz) and son Benedikt (who survived Buchenwald), suffered severely under Nazi persecution.

== Personal life ==
Kautsky married Louise Strasser in March 1883. They lived together in Stuttgart and London. The marriage was often strained by financial difficulties and Kautsky's intense focus on his work. They divorced in 1889 after a lengthy process following their separation in 1888; the split caused considerable distress among their socialist friends, particularly Friedrich Engels. Louise Strasser later remarried.

In April 1890, Kautsky married Luise Ronsperger, a friend of his mother's. This second marriage lasted until Karl's death and was by all accounts a close intellectual and personal partnership. Luise Kautsky was herself a socialist author and translator and acted as Karl's closest critic and collaborator. They had three sons: Felix (b. 1891), Karl Jr. (b. 1892), and Benedikt (b. 1894). Kautsky's family life was orderly; he devoted his mornings to writing, took afternoon walks (often with his sons), and evenings were for visiting or light reading. The Kautsky household hosted regular Sunday afternoon gatherings for socialist comrades and international visitors.

== Thought and legacy ==
Kautsky was a pivotal figure in the history of Marxism, primarily as its leading popularizer and systematizer during the era of the Second International. Described by Leszek Kołakowski as the "chief architect and, so to speak, the embodiment of Marxist orthodoxy", he translated Marx's complex theories into a coherent doctrine for a mass party, most notably through his editorship of Die Neue Zeit and his work on the Erfurt Program. He was known in his time as the "Pope of Marxism". According to the scholar Jukka Gronow, Kautsky was the central figure in the "formation of Marxism" as a distinct doctrine after Marx, creating a theoretical system that became the "common core" for the various theorists of the Second International, including his critics. Kołakowski notes that Kautsky played the main part in creating a "stereotype" of Marxism as an "evolutionist, determinist, and scientific form" that dominated for decades.

Gronow argues that Kautsky's theoretical framework rested on two main pillars, both stemming from a crucial misinterpretation of Marx's Capital. Kautsky, he contends, read Marx's work not as a critique of the fundamental categories of political economy, but as a historical and empirical work that laid out the developmental laws of capitalism. The first pillar of his theory was the formulation of these historical laws, which predicted the continuous concentration of capital and the inevitable polarisation of society. The second pillar, influenced by Engels, was his critique of capitalism based on the idea that it violated the original "natural right" of a producer to the product of their own labor, a right supposedly realized in an earlier historical stage of "simple commodity production". In Kautsky's framework, capitalism's defining feature became the appropriation of products created collectively by workers, in stark contrast to the individual appropriation of the pre-capitalist era.

Kautsky's interpretation of Marxism emphasized historical evolution and the inevitability of socialism, but also stressed the need for conscious political action by an organized working class. He sought a balance between determinism and voluntarism, arguing that while objective conditions shaped history, human will, particularly in the political realm, was crucial. His central political idea was what the historian Lars T. Lih calls the "merger formula": the conviction that "Social Democracy is the merger of socialism and the worker movement". According to this narrative, the socialist party's mission was to bring socialist consciousness—the "good news" of the proletariat's world-historical mission to create socialism—to the hitherto separate and spontaneously resistant working-class movement. His concept of socialist consciousness being "carried into the class struggle of the proletariat from outside" was famously adopted by Vladimir Lenin. Kautsky consistently distinguished between political revolution (the seizure of state power) and social revolution (the longer-term transformation of economic structures), a distinction that became central to his critique of Bolshevism.

Kautsky's Marxism was characterized by a strong rationalist and humanist bent. He abhorred violence and believed socialism could only be achieved through democratic means by a conscious majority. This put him at odds with the Leninist model of a vanguard party and revolutionary dictatorship, leading to his denunciation by communists as a "renegade". According to his biographer Massimo Salvadori, the "renegade" charge was a polemical caricature; Kautsky's post-1917 opposition to Bolshevism was a consistent application of the democratic and parliamentary conception of the state that he had developed as early as the 1890s. Non-communist critics often faulted him for revolutionary rhetoric that was not matched by practical action, or for an overly deterministic, "fatalistic" view of history that underestimated the need for pragmatic reform. According to Dick Geary, Kautsky's theoretical ambiguity and "optimistic fatalism" made practical sense in the repressive but non-revolutionary political stalemate of Imperial Germany, but left his theory ill-prepared for the revolutionary upheavals after 1914. The philosopher Walter Benjamin later observed that Kautsky's Darwinian view of history was a "double-edged sword" that served to "maintain the party's faith and determination in its struggle" during periods of persecution, but later "burdened the concept of 'development' more and more as the party became less willing to risk what it had gained".

Kautsky's legacy is contested. While influential, he was "certainly not an outstanding philosopher"; Kołakowski notes his "complete lack of understanding of philosophical problems", stating that the "key problems of metaphysics and epistemology ... are unknown to him". He was, however, "pedantically orthodox" in regarding Marxism as a self-sufficient system that should not be supplemented by other philosophies, with the notable exception of Darwinism. Steenson concludes that Kautsky's greatest weakness was his "failure to see his theoretical positions translated into effective action" and to perceive that "practice tended to be self-perpetuating quite independently of theory". Some scholars, such as Moira Donald, argue that Kautsky's influence, particularly on Lenin, has been underestimated. Donald contends that much of what became Bolshevik ideology before 1917 was formulated by Kautsky, and that Lenin was more of a "tactician rather than a thinker", adapting Kautsky's orthodox Marxism to Russian conditions. With the retreat of communism in the late 20th century, Steenson, in his 1991 preface, suggests that Kautsky's moderate, humanist interpretation of Marx might find renewed relevance as a counterpoint to the discredited Leninist tradition.

=== Marxism and evolutionary theory ===
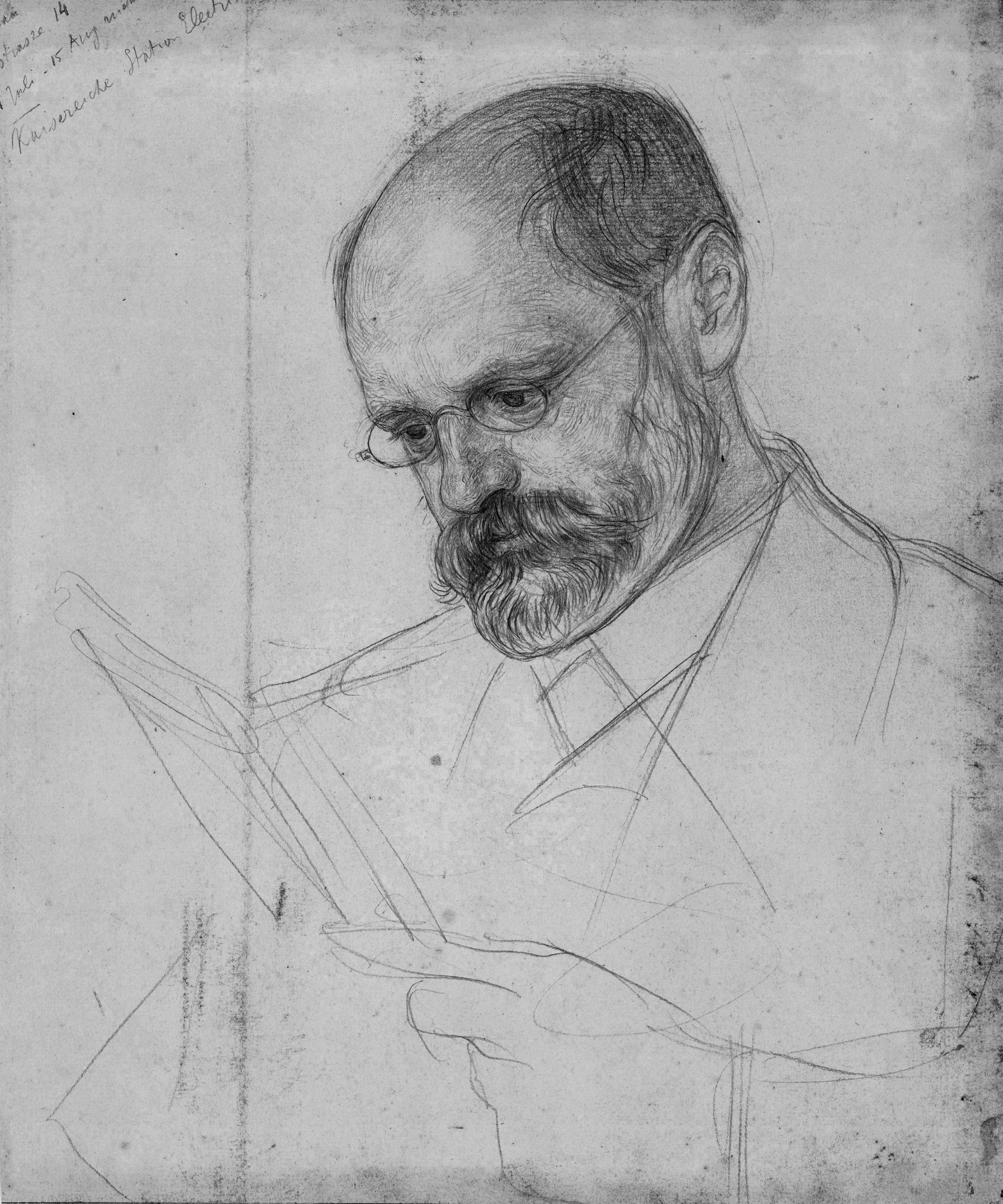
Sketch of Kautsky by Jan Veth

Kautsky's lifelong engagement with evolutionary theory was central to his thought. He saw Darwinism as a crucial factor in his conversion to materialism and a key scientific basis for a modern, secular worldview. In his pre-Marxist years, his conception of history was a form of social Darwinism that viewed social development as a struggle for existence between races and tribes. After embracing Marxism, he sought to integrate the two theories. A core element of this synthesis was his theory of "social instincts". Adopting Darwin's idea that morality evolved from the instincts of social animals, Kautsky argued that humanity had inherited "communist instincts" of solidarity, self-sacrifice, and loyalty from its animal ancestors. He contended that these instincts were a selective advantage in early human history but had been suppressed by capitalism's individualism. Socialism, for Kautsky, was thus not a utopian ideal but was "grounded as much in the essence of the human as in the course of historical development", representing the revival of these innate social instincts.

The greatest tension between Darwinism and Marxism was the Malthusian concept of a struggle for existence driven by population pressure. Kautsky initially accepted a modified version but later rejected its applicability to human society. Around 1900, he resolved this contradiction by abandoning Darwinian natural selection in favour of neo-Lamarckism. This theory, emphasizing the inheritance of acquired characteristics and direct environmental influence, was more compatible with his Marxism. It allowed him to explain evolution without recourse to an intraspecific struggle for existence, which he came to see as playing a minimal role in nature and none in a future socialist society. Kautsky's evolutionary thought also led him to support socialist eugenics. He shared the concern that modern society promoted degeneration by eliminating natural selection and allowing the "weak and sick to reproduce". His solution was rational social planning under socialism, which would eliminate the conditions causing degeneration and replace natural selection with artificial selection. Kautsky believed that public opinion, not compulsion, would guide the "weak, sick, and inferior" to voluntarily refrain from having children.

Kautsky's synthesis of Marxism and evolutionary theory was criticised by leftists like Karl Korsch as "Darwino-Marxism", a fatalistic theory of gradual evolution that replaced revolutionary dialectic. Kautsky, however, insisted he adhered to Engels's formulation of the dialectic and argued that evolution did not exclude revolution, but rather that revolution was a "special phase" of evolution under specific conditions.

== Selected works ==
- Der Einfluss der Volksvermehrung auf den Fortschritt der Gesellschaft (The Influence of Population Increase on the Progress of Society). 1880.
- Karl Marx’ ökonomische Lehren (The Economic Doctrines of Karl Marx). 1887.
- Thomas More und seine Utopie (Thomas More and his Utopia). 1888.
- Die Klassengegensätze von 1789. Zum hundertjährigen Gedenktag der großen Revolution (The Class Antagonisms of 1789: On the Centenary of the Great Revolution). 1889.
- Das Erfurter Programm in seinem grundsätzlichen Teil erläutert (The Erfurt Program Explained in its Fundamental Part). 1892. Also known as The Class Struggle (Erfurt Program).
- Der Parlamentarismus, die Volksgesetzgebung und die Sozialdemokratie (Parliamentarism, Direct Legislation, and Social Democracy). 1893. Later republished as Parlamentarismus und Demokratie (Parliamentarism and Democracy).
- "Unser neuestes Programm" ("Our Newest Program"). Die Neue Zeit. 1894–1895.
- Die Vorläufer des neueren Sozialismus. Erster Band, erster Theil. Von Plato bis zu den Wiedertäufern (Forerunners of Modern Socialism, Volume One, Part One: From Plato to the Anabaptists). 1895.
  - Der Kommunismus im Mittelalter und im Zeitalter der Reformation (Communism in Central Europe in the Time of the Reformation). 1895.
- Bernstein und das Sozialdemokratische Programm. Eine Antikritik (Bernstein and the Social Democratic Programme: An Anti-Critique). 1899.
- Die Agrarfrage: Eine Uebersicht über die Tendenzen der modernen Landwirthschaft und die Agrarpolitik der Sozialdemokratie (The Agrarian Question: A Survey of the Tendencies of Modern Agriculture and the Agrarian Policy of Social Democracy). 1899.
- Die soziale Revolution (The Social Revolution). 1902.
- Ethik und materialistische Geschichtsauffassung (Ethics and the Materialist Conception of History). 1906.
- Der Ursprung des Christentums (Foundations of Christianity). 1908.
- Der Weg zur Macht. Politische Betrachtungen über das Hineinwachsen in die Revolution (The Road to Power: Political Reflections on Growing into the Revolution). 1909.
- "Eine neue Strategie" ("A New Strategy"). Die Neue Zeit. 1910.
- Handelspolitik und Sozialdemokratie (The Trade Policy and Social Democracy). 1911.
- "Massenaktion" ("The Struggle of the Masses"). Die Neue Zeit. 1912.
- Der politische Massenstreik. Ein Beitrag zur Geschichte der Massenstreikdiskussionen innerhalb der deutschen Sozialdemokratie (The Political Mass Strike: A Contribution to the History of Mass Strike Discussions within German Social Democracy). 1914.
- "Der Imperialismus" ("On Imperialism"). Die Neue Zeit. 1914.
- Die Internationalität und der Krieg (Internationalism and the War). 1915.
- Nationalstaat, imperialistischer Staat und Staatenbund (The National State, the Imperialist State, and the League of States). 1915.
- Die Befreiung der Nationen (The Liberation of Nations). 1917.
- Die Diktatur des Proletariats (The Dictatorship of the Proletariat). 1918.
- Demokratie oder Diktatur (Democracy or Dictatorship). 1918.
- Das Weitertreiben der Revolution (Driving the Revolution Forward). 1919.
- Wie der Weltkrieg entstand. Dargestellt nach dem Aktenmaterial des Deutschen Auswärtigen Amts (How the World War Arose: Presented from the Archival Material of the German Foreign Office). 1919. Also known as The Guilt of William Hohenzollern.
- Terrorismus und Kommunismus. Ein Beitrag zur Naturgeschichte der Revolution (Terrorism and Communism: A Contribution to the Natural History of the Revolution). 1919.
- Von der Demokratie zur Staatssklaverei. Eine Auseinandersetzung mit Trotzki (From Democracy to State Slavery: A Polemic with Trotsky). 1921.
- Georgien: Eine sozialdemokratische Bauernrepublik. Eindrücke und Beobachtungen (Georgia: A Social-Democratic Peasant Republic. Impressions and Observations). 1921.
- Die proletarische Revolution und ihr Programm (The Labour Revolution). 1922.
- Die Internationale und Sowjetrussland (The International and Soviet Russia). 1925.
- Die materialistische Geschichtsauffassung (The Materialist Conception of History). 1927. Two volumes.
- Der Bolschewismus in der Sackgasse (Bolshevism at a Deadlock). 1930.
- Krieg und Demokratie. Eine historische Untersuchung und Darstellung ihrer Wechselwirkungen in der Neuzeit (War and Democracy: A Historical Study and Presentation of Their Interactions in the Modern Era). 1932.
- "Sozialdemokratie und Kommunismus" ("Social Democracy versus Communism"). Der Kampf. 1932.
- "Hitlerismus und Sozialdemokratie" ("Hitlerism and Social Democracy"). Der Kampf. 1934.
- Grenzen der Gewalt: Aussichten und Wirkungen bewaffneter Erhebungen des Proletariats (Limits of Violence: Prospects and Effects of Armed Uprisings of the Proletariat). 1934.
- Sozialisten und Krieg: Ein Beitrag zur Ideengeschichte des Sozialismus von den Hussiten bis zum Völkerbund (Socialists and War: A Contribution to the Intellectual History of Socialism from the Hussites to the League of Nations). 1937. Published posthumously.

== See also ==
- Terrorism and Communism – 1920 pamphlet by Leon Trotsky responding to Kautsky's 1918 pamphlet of the same name

== Bibliography ==
- Donald, Moira (1993). Marxism and Revolution: Karl Kautsky and the Russian Marxists, 1900–1924. New Haven: Yale University Press. ISBN 0-300-04390-2.
- Geary, Dick (1987). Karl Kautsky. Manchester: Manchester University Press. ISBN 0-7190-2158-8.
- Greene, Douglas (2024). The New Reformism and the Revival of Karl Kautsky: The Renegade's Revenge. Marx and Marxisms: New Horizons. New York: Routledge. ISBN 978-1-032-75878-7.
- Gronow, Jukka (2016). On the Formation of Marxism: Karl Kautsky's Theory of Capitalism, the Marxism of the Second International and Karl Marx's Critique of Political Economy. Leiden: Brill. ISBN 978-90-04-30664-6.
- Kautsky, John H. (1994). Karl Kautsky: Marxism, Revolution, and Democracy. New Brunswick: Transaction Publishers. ISBN 1-56000-109-7.
- Kołakowski, Leszek (1978). Main Currents of Marxism, Vol. 2: The Golden Age. Translated by Falla, P. S. Oxford: Clarendon Press. ISBN 0-19-824569-6.
- Lih, Lars T. (2006). Lenin Rediscovered: What Is to Be Done? in Context. Historical Materialism Book Series. Vol. 9. Leiden: Brill. ISBN 90-04-13120-5.
- Salvadori, Massimo L. (1979). Karl Kautsky and the Socialist Revolution, 1880–1938. Translated by Rothschild, Jon. London: NLB. ISBN 9780860910152.
- Schorske, Carl E. (1955). German Social Democracy, 1905–1917: The Development of the Great Schism. Cambridge: Harvard University Press.
- Steenson, Gary P. (1981). Not One Man! Not One Penny!: German Social Democracy, 1863–1914. Pittsburgh: University of Pittsburgh Press. ISBN 0-8229-3440-X.
- Steenson, Gary P. (1991) [1978]. Karl Kautsky, 1854–1938: Marxism in the Classical Years (2nd ed.). Pittsburgh: University of Pittsburgh Press. ISBN 0-8229-5443-5.
- Weikart, Richard (1998). Socialist Darwinism: Evolution in German Socialist Thought from Marx to Bernstein. San Francisco: International Scholars Publications. ISBN 978-1-5730-9290-6.
