= Orthodox Marxism =

Body of Marxist thought, prominent until World War I

Orthodox Marxism is the body of Marxist thought that emerged in the period between the deaths of Karl Marx and Friedrich Engels in the late 19th century and 1914, expressed in its primary form by Karl Kautsky. Kautsky's views of Marxism dominated the European Marxist movement for two decades, and orthodox Marxism was the philosophy of the majority of the socialist movement as represented in the Second International until the First World War in 1914, whose outbreak caused Kautsky's influence to wane and brought to prominence the orthodoxy of Vladimir Lenin on the left and reformist socialism on the right. Orthodox Marxism aimed to codify and systematize Marxist method and theory by clarifying perceived ambiguities and contradictions in classical Marxism.

Orthodox Marxism maintained that Marx's historical materialism was a science which revealed the laws of history and proved that the collapse of capitalism and its replacement by socialism were inevitable. The implications of this deterministic view were that history could not be "hurried" and that politically workers and workers' parties must wait for the material economic conditions to be met before the revolutionary transformation of society could take place. For example, this idea saw the Social Democratic Party of Germany (SPD) adopt a gradualist approach, taking advantage of bourgeois parliamentary democracy to improve the lives of workers until capitalism was brought down by its "internal contradictions".

The use of "orthodox" to refer to Kautsky's line is primarily to distinguish it from the reformism of Eduard Bernstein. Such "revisionists" were reviled by the orthodox Marxists for breaking with Marx's thought. Orthodox Marxism also distinguished itself from challengers on the left, as Rosa Luxemburg supported more radical tactics such as the mass strike.

== History ==
The emergence of orthodox Marxism is associated with the latter works of Friedrich Engels, such as the Dialectics of Nature and Socialism: Utopian and Scientific, which were efforts to popularise the work of Karl Marx, render it systematic and apply it to the fundamental questions of philosophy. Daniel De Leon, an early American socialist leader, contributed much to the thought during the final years of the 19th century and the early 20th century. Orthodox Marxism was further developed during the Second International by thinkers such as Georgi Plekhanov and Karl Kautsky in Erfurt Program and The Class Struggle (Erfurt Program).

Karl Kautsky is recognized as the most authoritative promulgator of orthodox Marxism following the death of Engels in 1895. As an advisor to August Bebel, leader of the Social Democratic Party of Germany (SPD) until Bebel's death in 1913 and as editor of Die Neue Zeit from 1883 till 1917, he was known as the "Pope of Marxism". He was removed as editor by the leadership of the SPD when the Independent Social Democratic Party of Germany (USPD) split away from the SPD. Kautskyism, based on his interpretations of Marxism, became a significant ideological current within socialist thought.

Menshevism refers to the political positions taken by the Menshevik faction of the Russian Social Democratic Labour Party prior to the October Revolution of 1917. The Mensheviks believed that socialism could not be realized in Russia due to its backwards economic conditions and that Russia would first have to experience a bourgeois revolution and go through a capitalist stage of development before socialism became technically possible and before the working class could develop the class consciousness for a socialist revolution.

== Theory ==
Orthodox Marxism is contrasted with revisionist Marxism, and grew out of the European working class movement that emerged in the final quarter of the 19th century, continuing in that form until the middle years of the twentieth century. Its two institutional expressions were the 2nd and 3rd Internationals, which despite the great schism in 1919, were marked by a shared conception of capital and labour. Trotskyism and Left communism were equally orthodox in their thinking and approach, and are considered by some to be left-wing variants of this tradition.

Two variants of orthodox Marxism are impossibilism and anti-revisionism. Impossibilism is a form of orthodox Marxism that both rejects the reformism of revisionist Marxism and opposes the Leninist theories of imperialism, vanguardism and democratic centralism (which argue that socialism can be constructed in underdeveloped, quasi-feudal countries through revolutionary action as opposed to being an emergent result of advances in material development). An extreme form of this position is held by the Socialist Party of Great Britain.

== Variants ==
A number of theoretical perspectives and political movements emerged that were firmly rooted in orthodox Marxist analysis, as contrasted with later interpretations and alternative developments in Marxist theory and practice such as Marxism–Leninism, revisionism and reformism.

=== Impossibilism ===
Impossibilism stresses the limited value of economic, social, cultural and political reforms under capitalism and posits that socialists and Marxists should solely focus on efforts to propagate and establish socialism, disregarding any other cause that has no connection to the goal of the realization of socialism.

Impossibilism posits that reforms to capitalism are counterproductive because they strengthen support for capitalism by the working class by making its conditions more tolerable while creating further contradictions of their own, while removing the socialist character of the parties championing and implementing said reforms. Because reforms cannot solve the systemic contradictions of capitalism, impossibilism opposes reformism, revisionism and ethical socialism.

=== Leninism and Stalinism ===
Kautsky and to a lesser extent Plekhanov were in turn major influences on Vladimir Lenin, whose version of Marxism was known as Leninism by its contemporaries. Whereas the generation of orthodox Marxists before Marx, such as Plekhanov, believed that Imperial Russia was too backwards for the development of socialism and would first have to undergo a capitalist (bourgeois) phase of development even if a Marxist party would head its government, Lenin urged a socialist revolution in Russia to inspire a socialist revolution in Germany and in the majority of the developed countries. His and Bukharin's New Economic Policy was to develop capitalism in Russia initially.

=== Anti-revisionism ===
Anti-revisionists (which includes radical Marxist–Leninist factions, Hoxhaists and Maoists) criticize the rule of the communist states by claiming that they were state capitalist states ruled by revisionists. Though the periods and countries defined as state capitalist or revisionist varies among different ideologies and parties, all of them accept that the Soviet Union was socialist during Stalin's time. Maoists view the Soviet Union and most of its satellites as "state capitalist" as a result of de-Stalinization; some of them also view modern China in this light, believing that the People's Republic of China became state capitalist after Mao's death. Hoxhaists believe that the People's Republic of China was always state capitalist and uphold Socialist Albania as the only socialist state after the Soviet Union under Stalin.

== Criticism ==
There have been a number of criticisms of orthodox Marxism from within the socialist movement. From the 1890s during the Second International, Eduard Bernstein and others developed a position known as revisionism, which sought to revise Marx's views based on the idea that the progressive development of capitalism and the extension of democracy meant that gradual, parliamentary reform could achieve socialism. This view was contested by orthodox Marxists such as Kautsky as well as by the young György Lukács, who in 1919 clarified the definition of orthodox Marxism as thus:

[O]rthodoxy refers exclusively to method. It is the scientific conviction that dialectical materialism is the road to truth and that its methods can be developed, expanded and deepened only along the lines laid down by its founders. It is the conviction, moreover, that all attempts to surpass or 'improve' it have led and must lead to over-simplification, triviality and eclecticism.

Western Marxism, the intellectual Marxism which developed in Western Europe from the 1920s onwards, sought to make Marxism more "sophisticated", open and flexible by examining issues like culture that were outside the field of orthodox Marxism. Western Marxists, such as György Lukács, Karl Korsch, Antonio Gramsci and the Frankfurt School, have tended to be open to influences orthodox Marxists consider bourgeois, such as psychoanalysis and the sociology of Max Weber. Marco Torres illustrates the shift away from orthodox Marxism in the Frankfurt School:

In the early 1920s, the original members of the Frankfurt Institute—half forgotten names such as Carl Grünberg, Henryk Grossman and Karl August Wittfogel, were social scientists of an orthodox Marxist conviction. They understood their task as an advancement of the sciences that would prove useful in solving the problems of a Europe-wide transition into socialism, which they saw, if not as inevitable, at least as highly likely. But as fascism reared its head in Germany and throughout Europe, the younger members of the Institute saw the necessity for a different kind of Marxist Scholarship. Beyond accumulating knowledge relevant to an orthodox Marxist line, they felt the need to take the more critical and negative approach that is required for the maintenance of an integral and penetrating understanding of society during a moment of reaction. This could be described as the politically necessary transition from Marxist positive science to Critical Theory.

In parallel to this, Cedric Robinson has identified a Black Marxist tradition, including people like C.L.R. James, Walter Rodney and W. E. B. Du Bois, who have opened Marxism to the study of race, "stretching" it beyond orthodox Marxism.

In the postwar period, the New Left and new social movements gave rise to intellectual and political currents which again challenged orthodox Marxism. These include Italian autonomism, French Situationism, the Yugoslavian Praxis School, and British cultural studies.

== See also ==
- Left communism
- Materialist conception of history
- Marxian economics
- Marxist revisionism
- Real socialism
- Scientific socialism
- Technological determinism
