= Dictatorship of the proletariat =

State of affairs in Marxist theory

In Marxist theory, the dictatorship of the proletariat (sometimes abbreviated as DotP) is a state of affairs in which the proletariat, or the working class, holds political power. The term, as used by Karl Marx and Friedrich Engels, refers to a transitional stage between capitalism and communism. During this phase, the proletariat acts as the ruling class to suppress the resistance of the bourgeoisie (the former ruling class), destroy the social relations of production underlying the class system, and create a classless society. The concept's meaning and implications have been a source of major controversy and divergence within the Marxist movement.

The term "dictatorship" is derived from the ancient Roman dictatura, a constitutionally sanctioned office for a magistrate granted extraordinary powers during an emergency. For Marx and Engels, the "dictatorship of the proletariat" was not a specific form of government but a term for the class content of the state that would follow a proletarian revolution. They identified the Paris Commune of 1871—a radical socialist government based on principles like universal suffrage, recallable delegates, and a popular militia—as a concrete example of this concept. Engels later stated that the democratic republic was the "specific form" for the dictatorship of the proletariat.

The term's interpretation shifted decisively in the 20th century with the Russian Revolution. Vladimir Lenin redefined dictatorship as power won and maintained by force, "unrestricted by any law". The Bolsheviks argued that the devastation of the Russian Civil War and the threat of counter-revolution necessitated a revolutionary government unconstrained by constitutional limits. By the early 1920s, the dictatorship of the proletariat in Soviet Russia was officially equated with the rule of the Communist Party, its vanguard party. This interpretation was sharply criticized by other Marxists, such as Karl Kautsky and Rosa Luxemburg, who argued that it betrayed the democratic principles central to Marx's original conception.

The Leninist interpretation became the official doctrine of the international communist movement and was used to justify one-party rule in states such as the Soviet Union, the People's Republic of China, and other countries in the Eastern Bloc. Consequently, the term became associated with totalitarian rule. In the post-World War II era, many Western European socialist and communist parties, particularly those aligned with Eurocommunism, formally abandoned the concept as part of their shift towards a democratic, parliamentary road to socialism. The term's meaning, and whether the Leninist model was a legitimate development or a distortion of Marx's ideas, remains a subject of debate.

== Etymology and historical meaning ==
The term "dictatorship" in the 19th century was shaped by its ancient precedent, the Roman Republic's dictatura.

=== Roman dictatura ===
The original dictatura was an established office in the Roman Republic. It was a constitutional and legal mechanism for a single magistrate to be granted extraordinary powers to deal with an emergency, such as an invasion or civil disorder. Roman dictators could not make new laws and were expected to hand power back once the emergency, and their six-month term, had passed. The institution was not seen as inherently autocratic or tyrannical; for centuries, it operated within the republic's legal framework without leading to one-man rule. The institution broke down only when figures like Sulla and Julius Caesar destroyed it by having themselves appointed "perpetual dictators" and using the position to consolidate autocratic power.

This classical meaning of a temporary, constitutional emergency power survived into the 19th century and formed the basis for how the term "dictatorship" was understood. In 1855, Friedrich Engels, writing in the New-York Tribune, used the term explicitly in this Roman sense. Discussing the mismanaged British war effort in the Crimea, he suggested that the commander-in-chief should be given dictatorial powers equivalent to the Roman dictatura to overcome the army's inept organization, noting that this was a power "every other General-in-Chief" already possessed in a theater of war.

=== French Revolution ===
During the French Revolution, the term "dictatorship" became a political weapon. It was most often used as a pejorative accusation against political figures, especially Maximilien Robespierre, who were charged with aspiring to one-man rule. However, the meaning of the term also began to shift and broaden. The Girondins, for instance, denounced the rising power of the Paris Commune as a "dictatorial commission", and references were also made to the "dictatorship of the National Convention", the democratically elected assembly of the age. This extended the term's meaning from the dictatorship of a single person to the dictatorship of a political body or a section of the people.

The revolutionary Jean-Paul Marat was a notable proponent of a temporary dictatorship to save the revolution. He argued for the appointment of a supreme "military tribune, a dictator, or a triumvirate" with limited, temporary power to punish counter-revolutionaries. Marat was clear that this office would be strictly circumscribed, lasting for only a few days and with its mission limited to "the summary punishment of the intriguers". He envisioned this proposed official not as the head of government, but as a special agent for emergency action. This advocacy for a dictatorship to consolidate a new revolutionary government, rather than to preserve an existing one, marked a "clear, new direction in meaning for the old Roman term", according to historian Richard N. Hunt.

By the time Karl Marx first used the term "dictatorship of the proletariat" in 1850, the word "dictatorship" had a complex meaning. It was no longer exclusively associated with one-man rule but could also refer to the exercise of extraordinary political power by a class or a political body. As historian Hal Draper notes, it had "become a political term flung around the popular newspapers."

== Early socialist and Utopian views ==
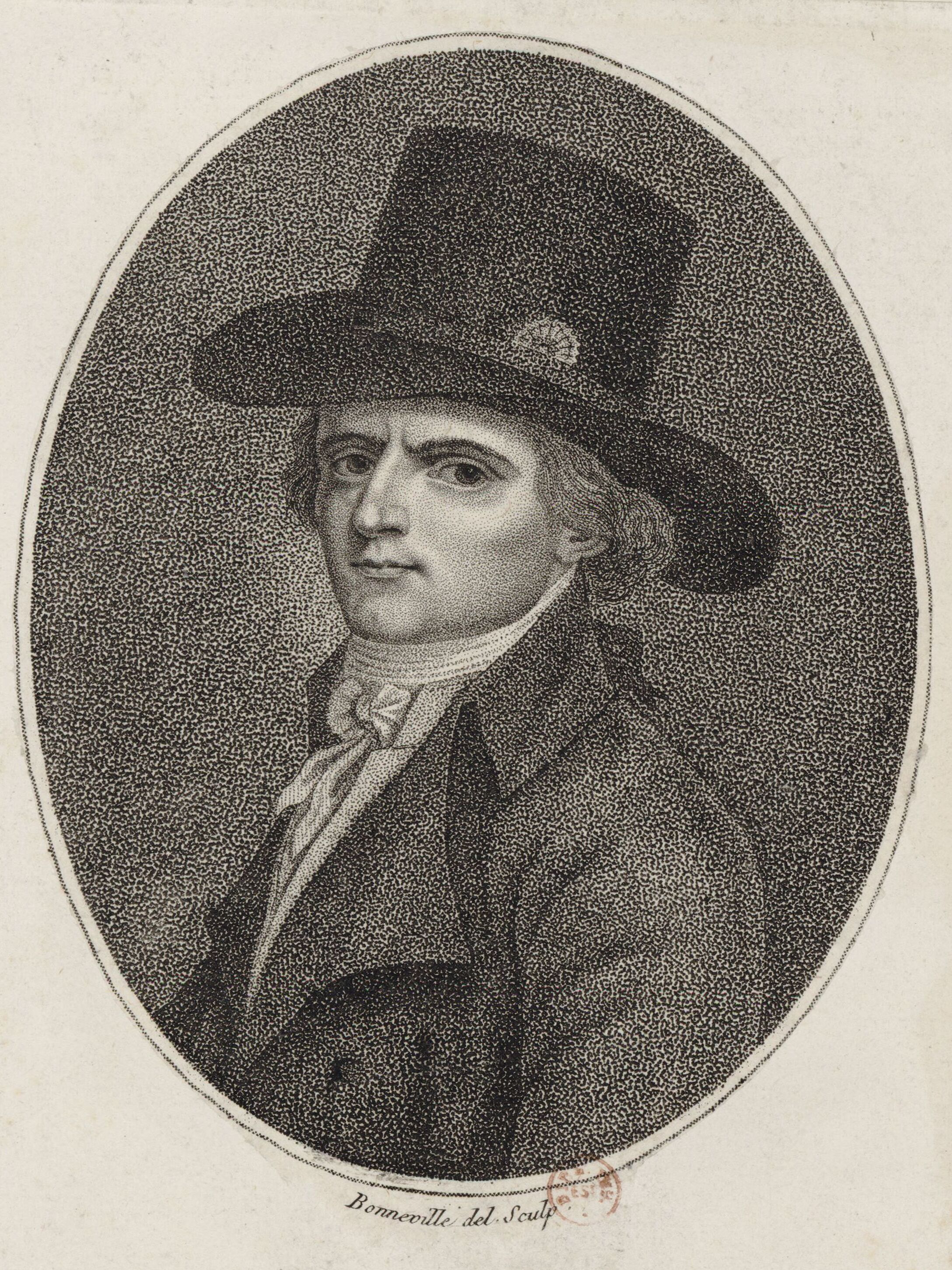
Gracchus Babeuf

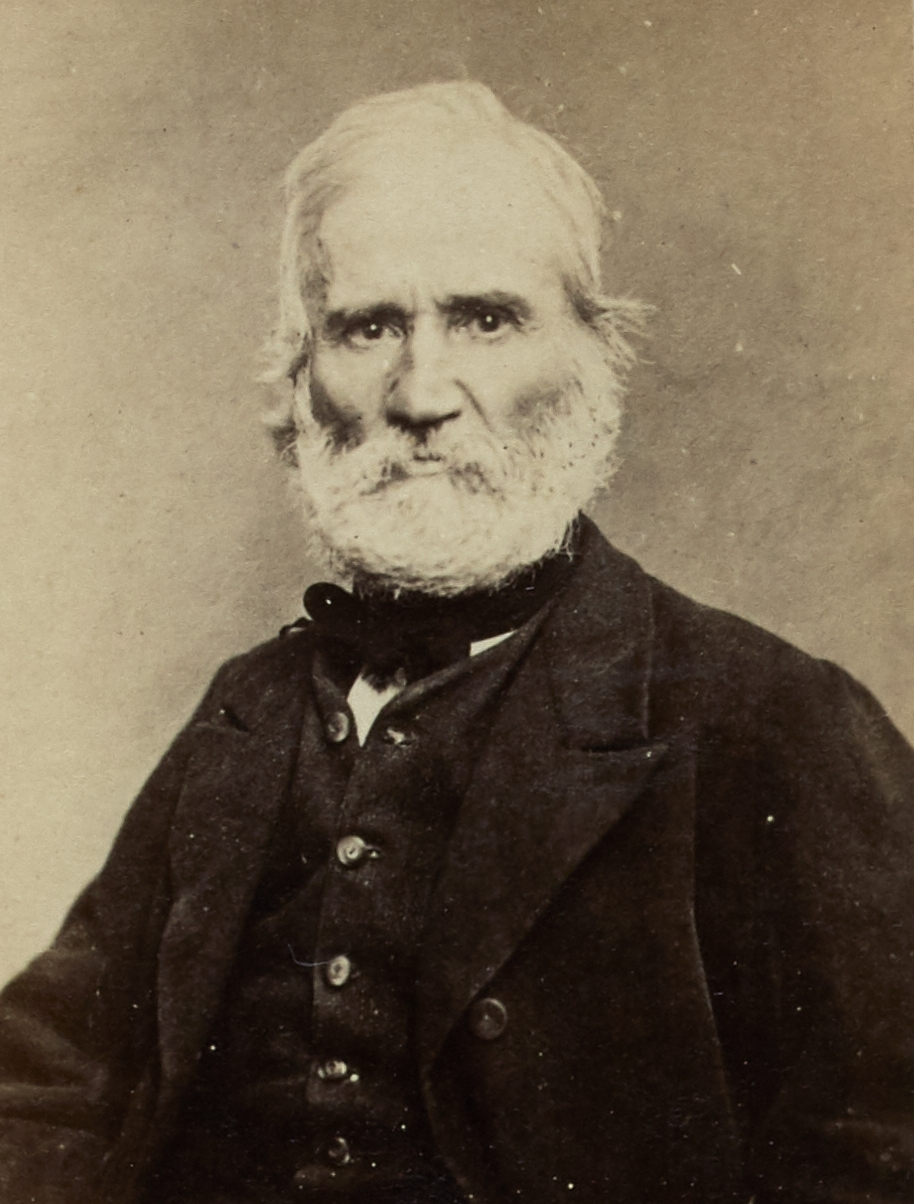
Auguste Blanqui

In early socialist and communist thought, the idea of a post-revolutionary government often took the form of an "educational dictatorship". This concept was rooted in the belief that the general population, having been corrupted by the existing social order, was incapable of achieving or building socialism on its own. It therefore needed to be guided from above by a revolutionary elite who had remained uncorrupted.

This view was first systematically articulated by the followers of Gracchus Babeuf in the Conspiracy of the Equals. One of Babeuf's lieutenants, Philippe Buonarroti, argued that "a people so strangely kept away from the natural order was scarcely capable of making useful choices, and had need of an extraordinary means that would return it to" a state where it could exercise its sovereignty. The proposed solution was a provisional revolutionary authority that would lead the people while educating them. This provisional regime had a threefold mission: to eradicate old institutions and their leaders, to establish a new egalitarian order based on common ownership, and to educate the masses in the new ways of "virtue". Buonarroti wrote that this task "can belong only to wise and courageous citizens" who would establish a government to "forever shield the people from the influence of the natural enemies of equality".

The concept of an educational dictatorship by an enlightened minority was common among the secret communist societies of the 1830s and 1840s. The term "dictatorship of the proletariat" was likely first used by the French revolutionary socialist Auguste Blanqui in 1837. Other socialists also advocated for similar ideas. Wilhelm Weitling, a pioneer of German communism, argued for a dictatorship led by a messianic figure with an army of thieves as his shock troops. Étienne Cabet, in his utopian novel Voyage en Icarie, described a long transitional period in which a dictator, Icar, introduces communism. These views were based on the premise that the working class was not yet ready for self-emancipation and required guidance from a revolutionary vanguard.

== Marx and Engels's conception ==
Hal Draper argues that for Karl Marx and Friedrich Engels, the "dictatorship of the proletariat" was not a form of government but a term describing the class content of the state that would follow the overthrow of the capitalist class. It was a synonym for "rule of the proletariat", a "workers' state", or "the conquest of political power by the proletariat", and it did not imply any specific institutional setup.

Marx's use of the term emerged in the context of the post-revolutionary period of 1848–1849, a time of political analysis and stock-taking. Draper argues that Marx strategically adopted the phrase "class dictatorship" to counter the prevailing Jacobin-Blanquist conception of a revolutionary dictatorship by a party or an elite minority. In opposition to the dictatorship of a party over the proletariat, Marx counterposed the dictatorship of the proletariat—the democratic rule of the entire working class. Other historians, such as Richard N. Hunt, have likewise argued against identifying Marx and Engels's concept with the "Babouvist-Blanquist model" of educational dictatorship by an elite.

=== First appearances (1850–1852) ===
Karl Marx

Marx first used the term "dictatorship of the working class" in 1850, in the first of a series of articles later republished as The Class Struggles in France, 1848 to 1850. Recounting the defeat of the workers' uprising in June 1848, he wrote that in place of their earlier demands, "there appeared the bold slogan of revolutionary struggle: Overthrow of the bourgeoisie! Dictatorship of the working class!" Draper argues that since there is no record of this slogan actually being used by the workers, Marx was likely proposing it himself, "putting words to the inchoate working-class aspiration expressed in the revolution."

In the third article of the series, published in March 1850, Marx elaborated on what revolutionary socialism entailed:

... the proletariat increasingly organizes itself around revolutionary socialism, around communism, for which the bourgeoisie itself has invented the name of Blanqui. This socialism is the declaration of the permanence of the revolution, the class dictatorship of the proletariat as the necessary transit point to the abolition of class distinctions generally...

Here, Marx links the concept of "class dictatorship" to the name of Blanqui. Draper and Hunt suggest that Marx was not claiming the slogan came from Blanqui, but rather that the bourgeoisie had attached Blanqui's name to revolutionary socialism as a bogeyman. This refers to events in 1848 when the bourgeoisie circulated stories that the workers' demonstrations were part of a Blanquist plot to impose communism. Hunt argues that by adopting the fearsome-sounding "dictatorship" but emphasizing its class nature ("Klassendiktatur"), Marx was attempting to persuade the Blanquists to accept the idea of class rule instead of clique rule.

In April 1850, Marx and Engels, together with Blanquist refugees in London and the left-wing Chartist leader George Julian Harney, co-signed the statutes of the "Société Universelle des Communistes Révolutionnaires" (SUCR). Article 1 stated the society's aim was "the overthrow of all the privileged classes, and to submit these classes to the dictatorship of the proletariat by maintaining the revolution in permanence until the realisation of communism". The project was short-lived and collapsed within months due to political disagreements. According to Draper, the formulation was a compromise: the Blanquists were satisfied by its revolutionary tone, while for Marx and Engels, the key was that it specified the dictatorship of the entire class of proletarians, not of a conspiratorial clique.

The term's next major appearance was in a letter from Marx to Joseph Weydemeyer on 5 March 1852. In it, Marx stated what he believed his new contribution to socialist theory was:

... what I did that was new was to prove: (1) that the existence of classes is only bound up with particular historical phases in the development of production; (2) that the class struggle necessarily leads to the dictatorship of the proletariat; (3) that this dictatorship itself only constitutes the transition to the abolition of all classes and to a classless society.

=== The Paris Commune and after (1871–1891) ===
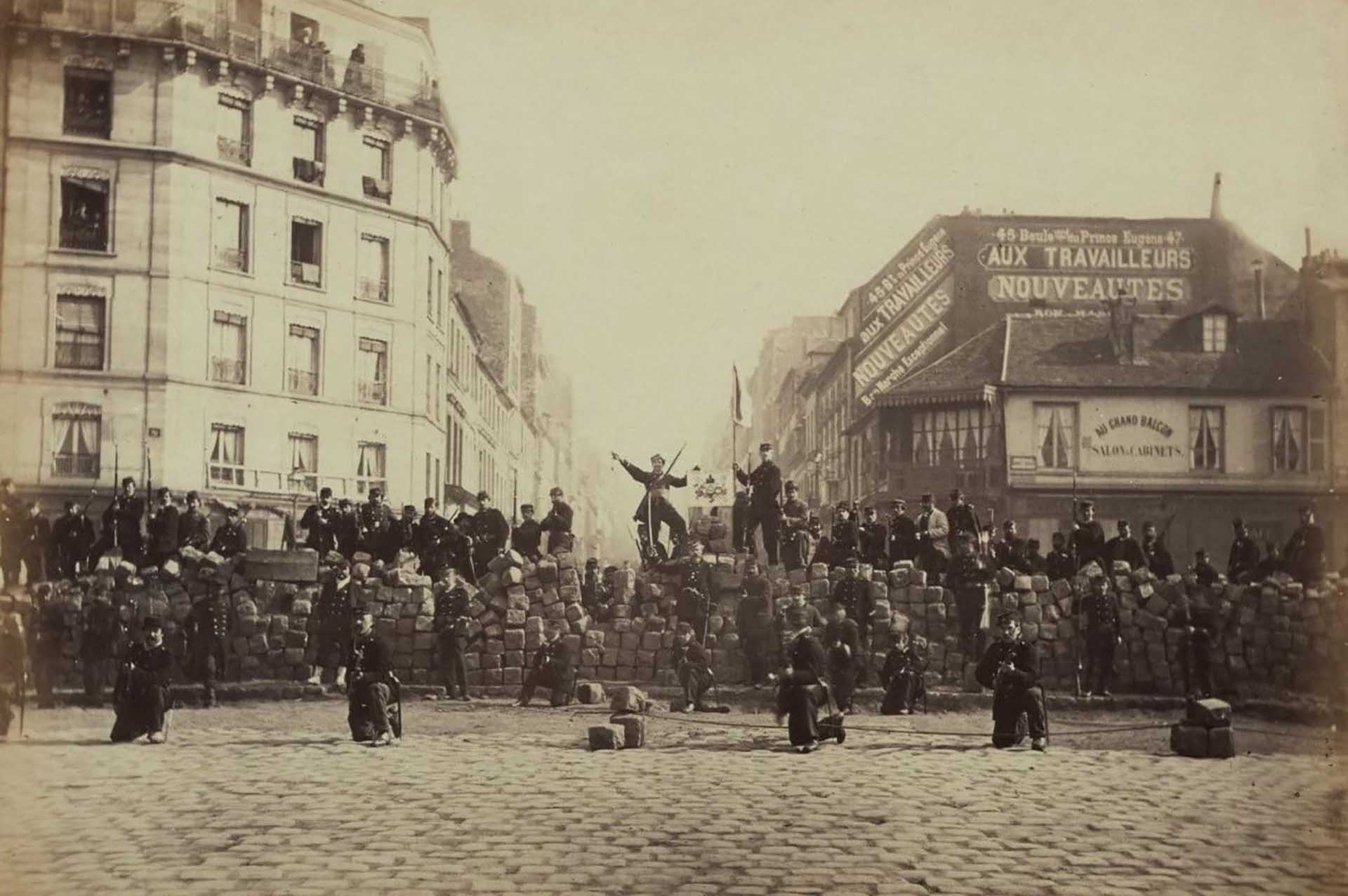
Barricade during the Paris Commune of 1871, which Marx and Engels regarded as an example of the dictatorship of the proletariat

After 1852, the term did not appear in the writings of Marx and Engels for nearly two decades. It re-emerged in the aftermath of the Paris Commune of 1871, a revolutionary government established by the workers of Paris. On 24 or 25 September 1871, at a banquet celebrating the seventh anniversary of the First International, Marx gave a speech in which he stated:

The last movement was the Commune, the greatest that has yet been made, and there could not be two opinions about it—the Commune was the conquest of the political power of the working classes. ... But before such a change could be effected a proletarian dictature would become necessary, and the first condition of that was a proletarian army. The working classes would have to conquer the right to emancipate themselves on the battlefield.

The question of whether the transition to a workers' state must be violent or could be peaceful was a key point of discussion. Marx noted that in countries with developed democratic institutions, such as the US, Britain, and the Netherlands, a peaceful path was possible. In an 1871 speech, he stated that revolutionaries would "act ... peacefully wherever possible", though he acknowledged that a peaceful development was contingent on the old ruling class not obstructing it by force. In contrast to the interpretation of scholars like Draper, who emphasize the democratic and peaceful-as-possible nature of Marx's conception, August Nimtz argues that Marx saw a need for violence and, consequently, centralization.

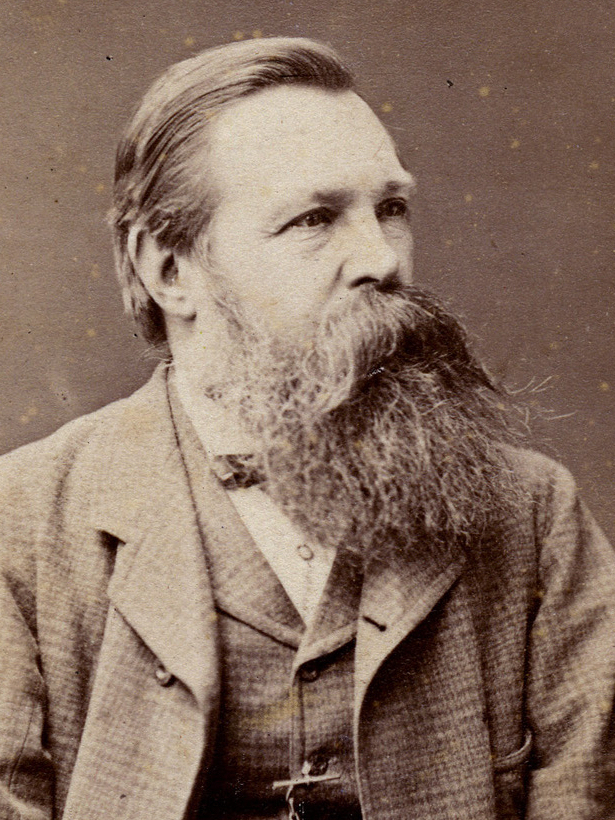
Friedrich Engels

In his 1873 polemic against the anarchists, "On Authority", Engels wrote that a revolution must maintain its rule "by means of the terror which its arms inspire in the reactionaries." When challenged to explain what this rule would look like, he pointed to the example of the Paris Commune. In a 1874 article on the Blanquist refugees, Engels explicitly contrasted the Blanquist conception of dictatorship with the Marxist one:

From Blanqui's assumption, that any revolution may be made by the outbreak of a small revolutionary minority, follows of itself the necessity of a dictatorship after the success of the venture. This is, of course, a dictatorship, not of the entire revolutionary class, the proletariat, but of the small minority that has made the revolution, and who are themselves previously organized under the dictatorship of one or several individuals. We see, then, that Blanqui is a revolutionary of the preceding generation.

In 1874–1875, Marx wrote extensive private notes on Mikhail Bakunin's book Statism and Anarchy, which had accused him of advocating an authoritarian, educational dictatorship of "learned Socialists" over the people. The exchange in Marx's notebook reveals his opposition to such a concept. When Bakunin sarcastically outlined what he believed to be the Marxist theory of a "veritable dictatorship" of "men of learning" to "educate and uplift the people", Marx's marginal note was "Quelle rêverie!" ("What a pipe dream!"). Marx wrote that the "class rule of the workers" would last only until "the economic basis that makes the existence of classes possible has been destroyed", and he explicitly abstained from using the word "dictatorship" in his response to Bakunin's charge, reverting to the German "Klassenherrschaft" (class rule) instead.

Marx also countered Bakunin's claim that a workers' government would simply rule over the peasantry. In countries with a large peasant population, Marx wrote, the proletariat must "take steps that will immediately improve his position and thus win him over to the revolution". These measures should "further the transition from private to communal ownership of land in such a way, that the peasant comes to it of his own accord on economic grounds." On the question of governance, Marx rejected Bakunin's portrayal of a new ruling elite. When Bakunin asked if all forty million Germans would be members of the government, Marx replied: "Certainly, for the thing begins with the self-government of the communities."

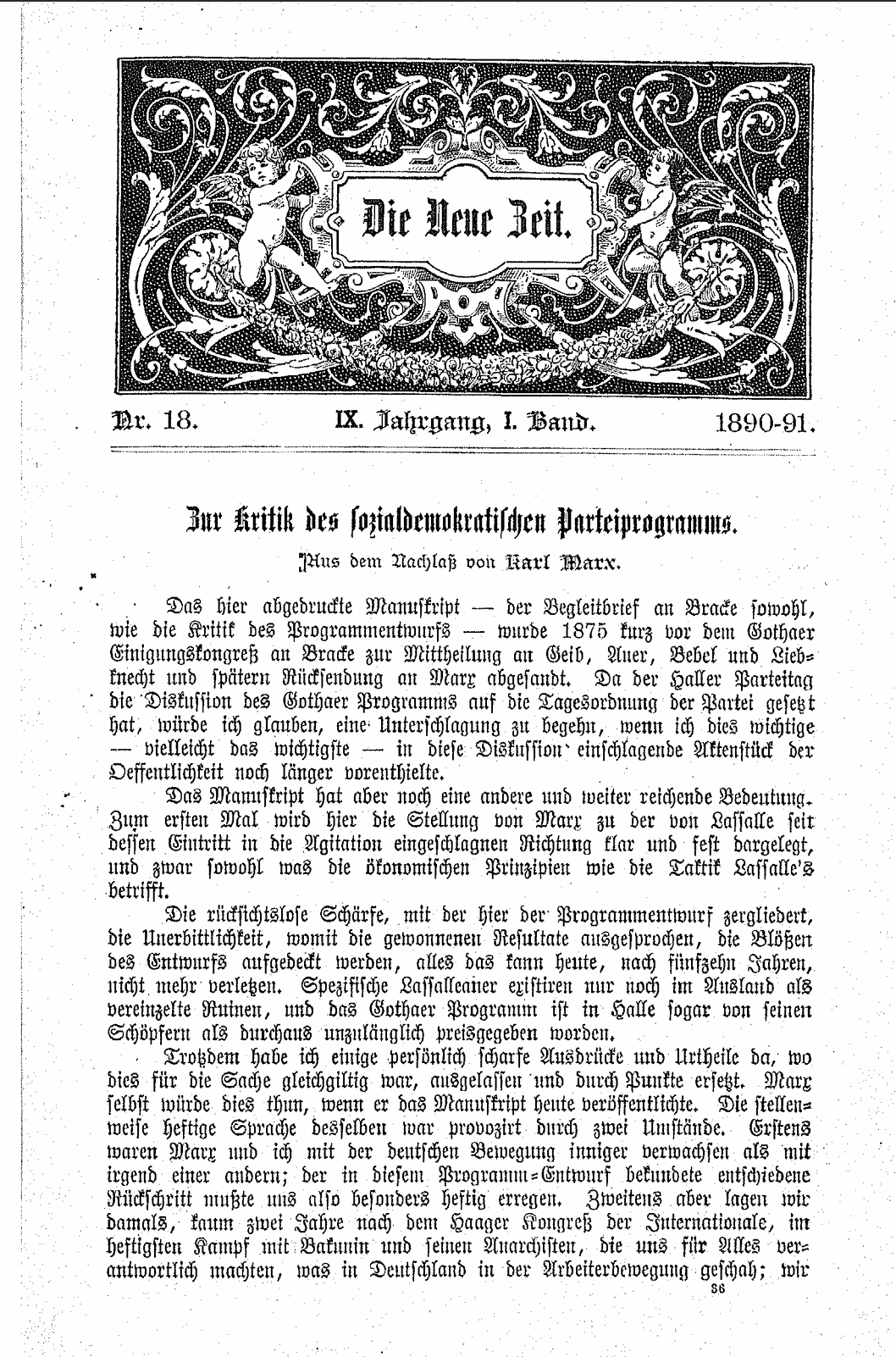
First page of the Critique of the Gotha Program, as published in Die Neue Zeit in 1891

The most famous use of the term appeared in a private letter: Marx's 1875 Critique of the Gotha Program, a critique of the draft program of the Social Democratic Party of Germany. In it, he wrote:

Between the capitalist and the communist society lies the period of the revolutionary transformation of the one into the other. To this there corresponds a political transition period whose state can be nothing but the revolutionary dictatorship of the proletariat.

Engels used the phrase for the final times in 1891. In his introduction to a new edition of Marx's The Civil War in France, he concluded his historical overview of the Paris Commune with the words:

Of late, the Social-Democratic philistine has once more been filled with wholesome terror at the phrase: dictatorship of the proletariat. Well and good, gentlemen, do you want to know what this dictatorship looks like? Look at the Paris Commune. That was the dictatorship of the proletariat.

In his critique of the draft of the Erfurt Program of the German Social-Democratic Party, Engels stated that "our party and the working class can come to power only under the form of the democratic republic. This is even the specific form for the dictatorship of the proletariat, as the great French revolution has already shown."

=== The Paris Commune as a model ===
For both Marx and Engels, the Paris Commune was a concrete example of the dictatorship of the proletariat. Draper's analysis identifies three key aspects of their view of the Commune that corresponded to this concept.

1. Workers' control: Marx described the Commune as "essentially a working-class government", a form in which the working class held political power. He declared that the "true secret" of the Commune was that it was "the political form at last discovered under which to work out the economic emancipation of labour".
2. Hegemony of the proletariat: Marx emphasized that the Commune was not just a government of the working class, but one that was recognized as the leader of all healthy elements of French society. He noted that the "great bulk of the Paris middle class" acknowledged the Commune as "the only class capable of social initiative". This demonstrated the principle of hegemony, where the revolutionary working class becomes the leader of other classes and social elements.
3. Democratic governance: Marx celebrated the Commune's democratic and anti-bureaucratic features, which he saw as a "revolution against the state itself". For Marx, the Commune provided "the basis of really democratic institutions" and was a government "of the people by the people". He highlighted its structural innovations: the abolition of the standing army in favor of a popular militia; the use of universal suffrage to elect fully recallable delegates and officials; the payment of workmen's wages for public officials; the unification of executive and legislative functions; the separation of church and state; and the plan for a decentralized federation of communes across France.

The abolition of the standing army was central to Marx and Engels's understanding. They held a dual conception of the state: the state as a "parasitic" body of professional administrators and soldiers standing apart from society, and the state as an instrument of class coercion. The Commune, they argued, had "smashed" the parasite state by deprofessionalizing the army, police, bureaucracy, and judiciary, and replacing them with ordinary people serving on a short-term, rotational basis. The coercive functions of the state, however, remained in the form of the National Guard, now a workers' militia. Engels famously argued that this new coercive power, made up of the armed people, was "no longer a state in the proper sense of the word". In contrast, the Blanquists who participated in the Commune saw it as a revolutionary dictatorship in the traditional sense. They advocated for the creation of a Committee of Public Safety, modeled on the original from 1793, and believed the Commune's primary mission was to defend the revolution through military and police action, postponing democratic and social reforms.

== In the Second International ==
After Friedrich Engels's death in 1895, the interpretation of the "dictatorship of the proletariat" became a point of contention within the Second International. According to Draper, Marx's original meaning—the rule of the working class—was widely "misunderstood" and reinterpreted to mean something about specific governmental forms or policies, often of an anti-democratic nature.

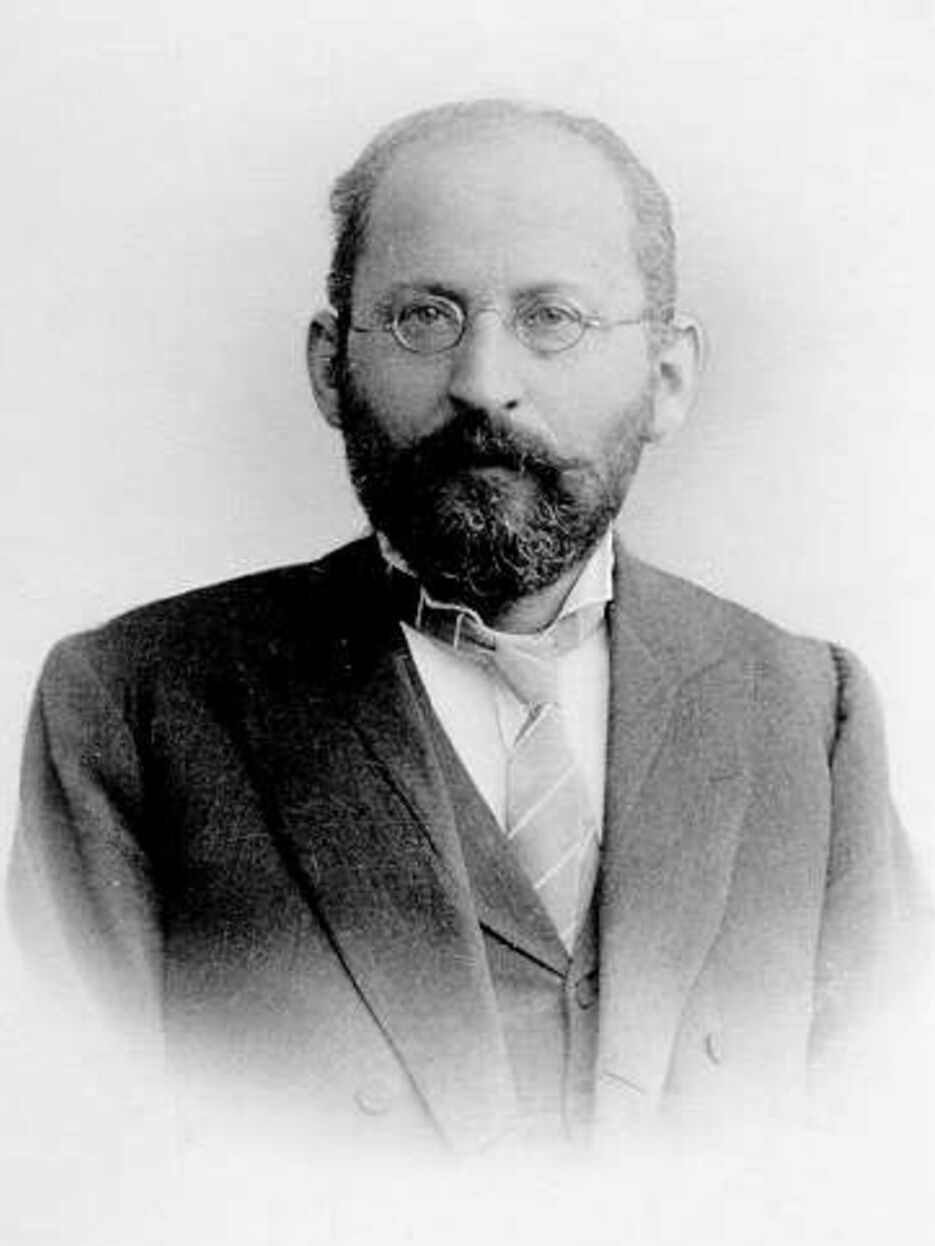
Eduard Bernstein

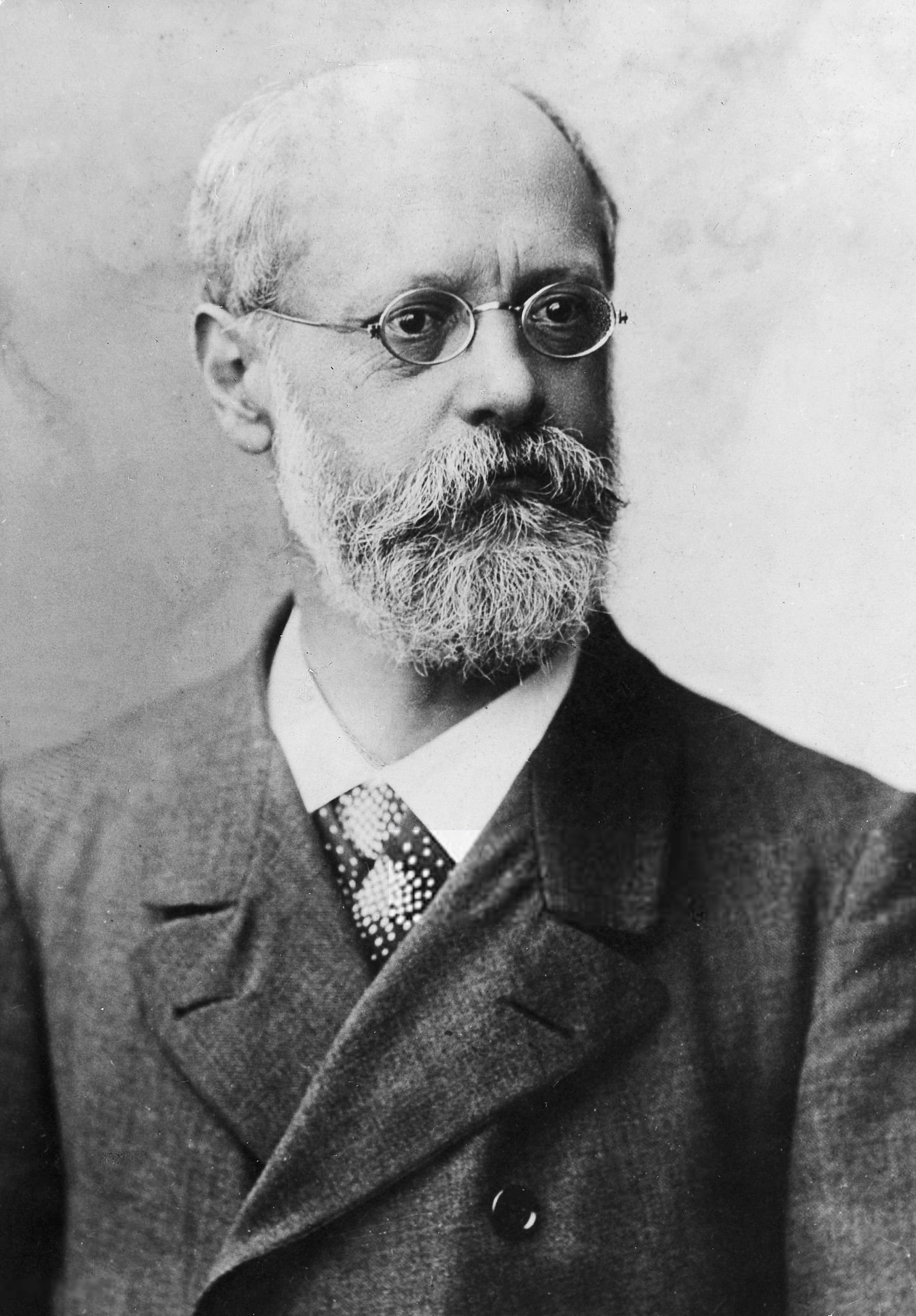
Karl Kautsky

The "revisionist" wing of the movement, led by Eduard Bernstein, was the first to attack the concept directly. In his 1899 book Evolutionary Socialism, Bernstein recommended dropping the phrase altogether, arguing it was incompatible with parliamentary democracy. He dismissed the concept of a "dictatorship of the classes" as a political "atavism" belonging to a "lower civilisation" and antithetical to the liberal traditions of social democracy. Reformist socialists like Jean Jaurès similarly counterposed Marx's "dictatorship" to democracy, assuming it meant the suspension of popular consent.

The "orthodox" Marxist center, represented by Karl Kautsky, offered a muddled defense. Before 1917, Kautsky's writings were inconsistent. In 1893, he wrote that a parliamentary republic with a socialist majority could be "as good an instrument of the dictatorship of the proletariat as it is an instrument of the dictatorship of the bourgeoisie." At other times, he suggested that while the "class rule of the proletariat" did not necessarily entail special "dictatorial measures", such measures might become necessary. For Draper, Kautsky failed to grasp that for Marx, the term did not refer to governmental measures at all but to the class character of political power.

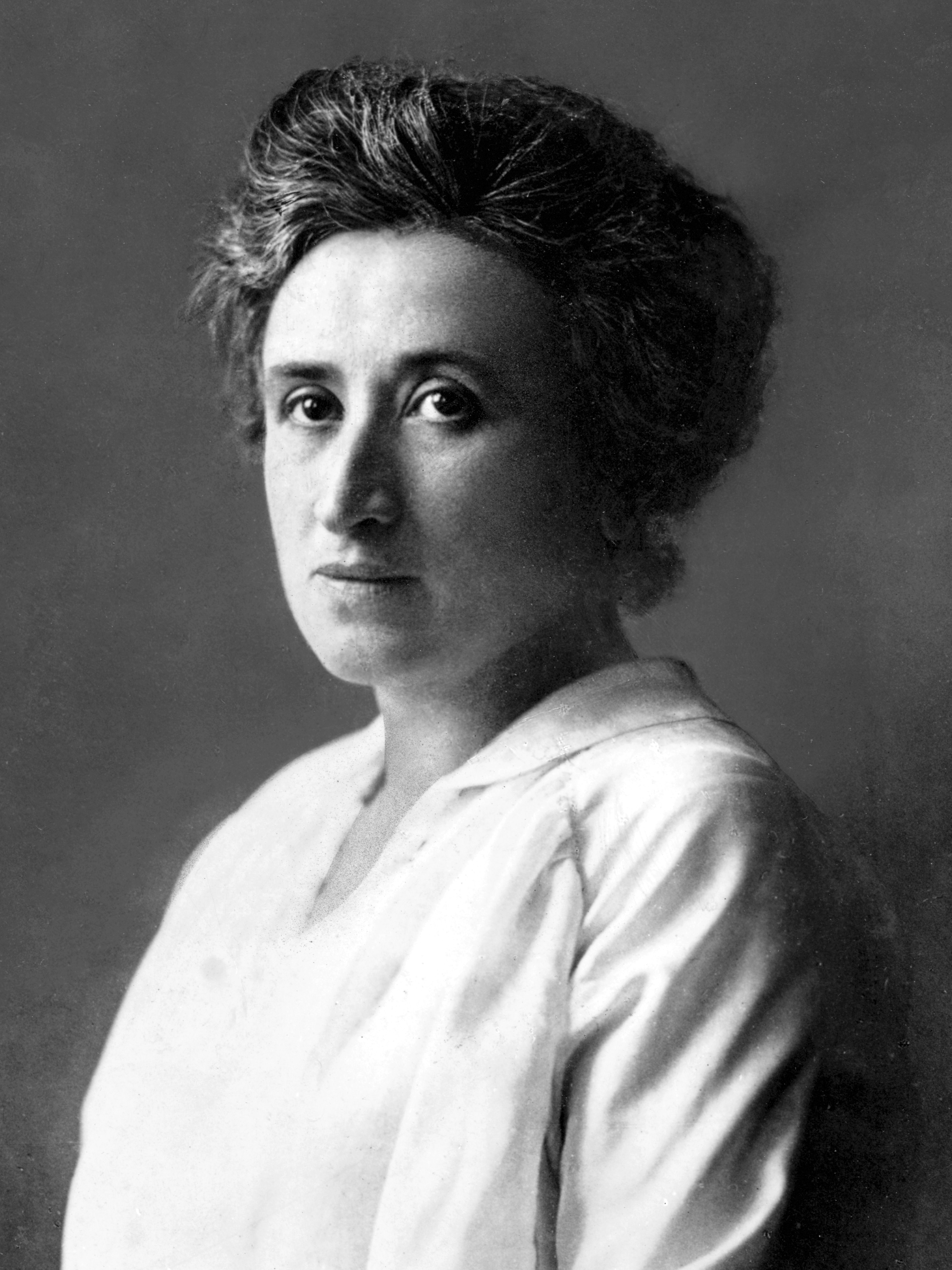
Rosa Luxemburg

In contrast to both revisionists and the orthodox center, Rosa Luxemburg consistently used the term in what Draper considers the original Marxist sense. For Luxemburg, the dictatorship of the proletariat was simply "the conquest of political power" by the working class, synonymous with the establishment of a workers' state. She saw no contradiction between this "dictatorship" and democracy, as both referred to the rule of the vast majority of the population.

== In the Russian Marxist movement ==
The concept of the "dictatorship of the proletariat" took on a particular meaning in the Russian socialist movement, largely shaped by Georgi Plekhanov and later redefined by Vladimir Lenin.

=== Georgi Plekhanov and the 1903 program ===
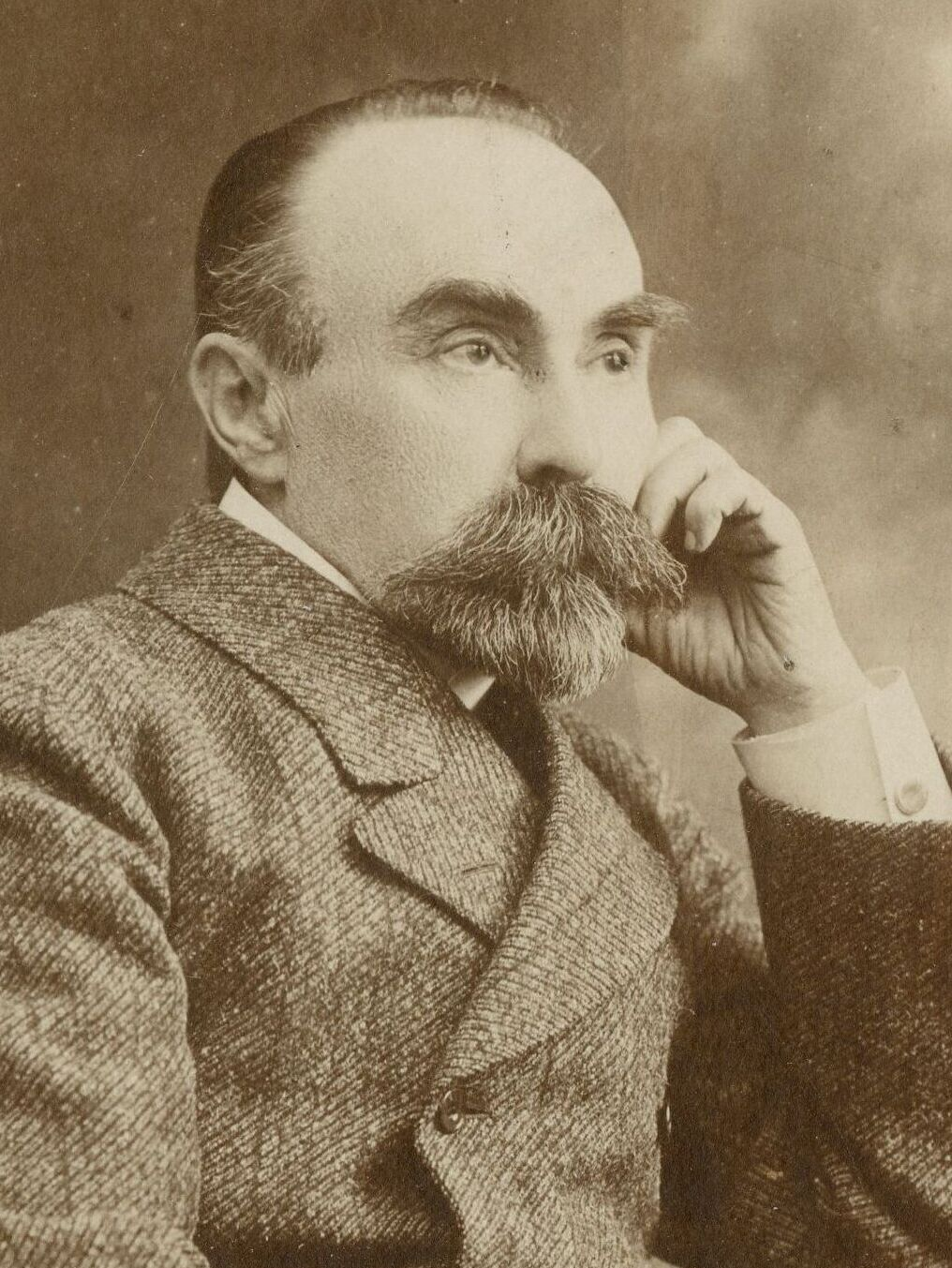
Georgi Plekhanov

Georgi Plekhanov, the "father of Russian Marxism", was responsible for introducing the term into the Russian movement and ensuring its inclusion in the party program. From the outset, Plekhanov's interpretation linked the concept to the necessity of suppressing counter-revolutionaries and sacrificing democratic principles for the sake of the revolution. In a conversation with Engels in 1893, Plekhanov expressed his view that a future revolutionary government would "grant freedoms to no one but 'ourselves'". Engels privately expressed dismay, suggesting to a confidant that such an approach would "either transform Russian Social Democracy into a sect ... or might produce a series of splits."

Plekhanov's view was publicly articulated at the 2nd Congress of the Russian Social Democratic Labour Party in 1903. This congress was unique in the Second International for formally including the "dictatorship of the proletariat" in its program, stating it was "the indispensable precondition for this social revolution". During the debates, a delegate argued that democratic principles must be held as inviolable. Plekhanov famously responded that if the success of the revolution required the temporary restriction of a democratic principle, such as universal suffrage, "it would be criminal to hesitate". He declared that the "welfare of the revolution is the supreme law" (Salus revolutionis suprema lex). This stance, Draper argues, laid the groundwork for an anti-democratic interpretation of the concept within Russian Marxism.

=== Lenin's evolving concept ===
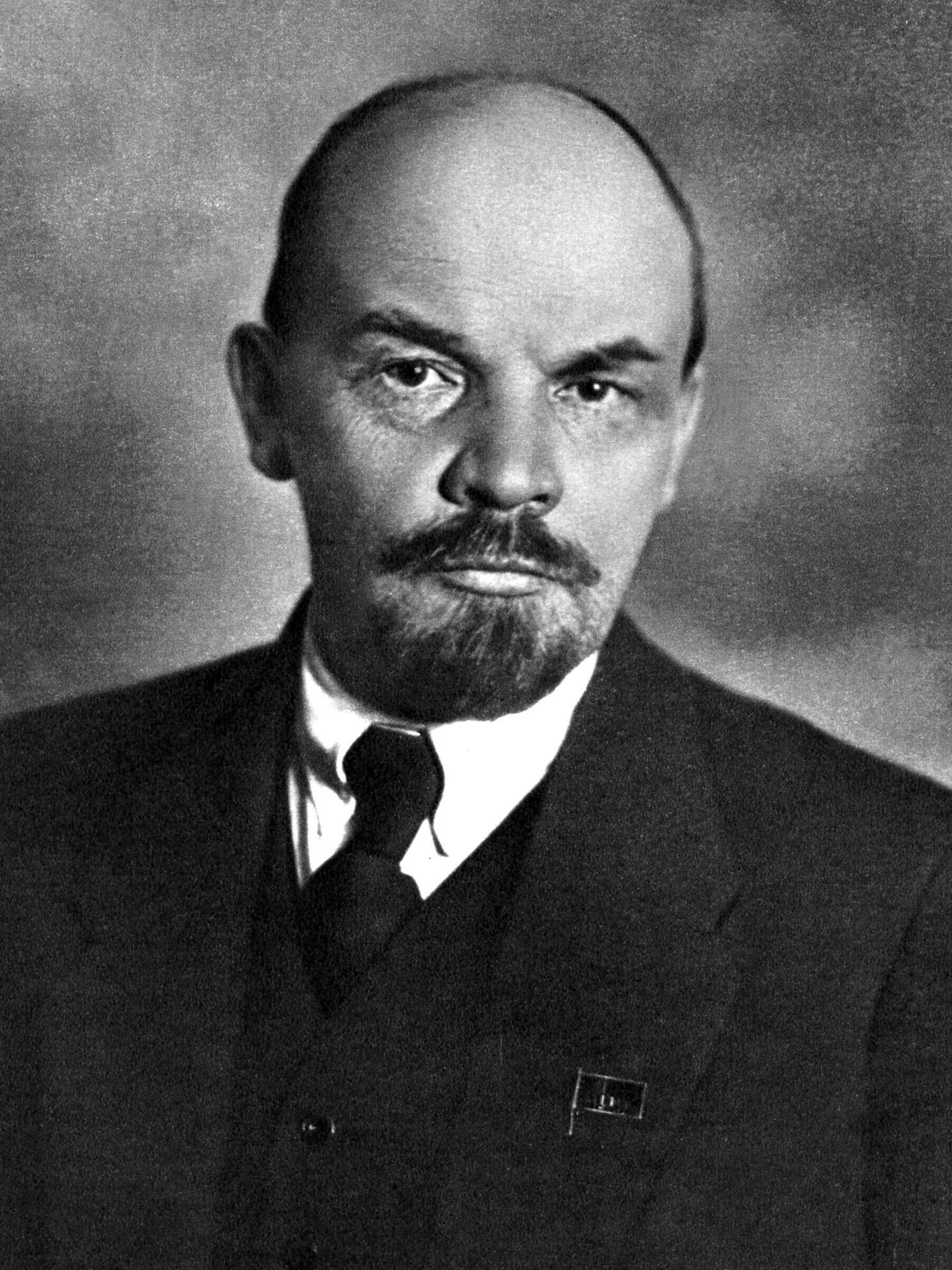
Vladimir Lenin

Like other Russian Marxists, Lenin initially accepted the term as part of the party's program. In the context of the 1905 Russian Revolution, he developed the formula of a "revolutionary-democratic dictatorship of the proletariat and the peasantry". This was a "two-class dictatorship" intended for the specific conditions of a backward country where the proletariat was a small minority and could only succeed in alliance with the peasant majority.

In 1906, in the aftermath of the failed revolution, Lenin articulated a new and, in Draper's view, theoretically unprecedented definition. He wrote that the "scientific term 'dictatorship' means nothing more nor less than authority untrammeled by any laws, absolutely unrestricted by any rules whatever, and based directly on force." Draper contends that this definition was a "theoretical blunder" with no basis in Marx's work or the historical tradition of the term. For Lenin, "dictatorship" now meant a government that operated outside of any legal framework. Other scholars argue that this formulation is consistent with the orthodox Marxist view of the state as an instrument of class rule, where any victorious power in a civil war must be a dictatorship based on force, not law. While this definition remained dormant until after 1917, it formed the basis for his later arguments justifying the actions of the Soviet state.

In The State and Revolution (1917), Lenin developed Marx's distinction between the lower and higher phases of communism. He argued that during the first phase, the workers' state would still need to enforce "bourgeois right"—the principle of distribution based on work performed rather than need. In this sense, he concluded, there remains for a time "the bourgeois state, without the bourgeoisie", an apparatus to enforce inequality.

== The Russian Revolution and its aftermath ==
The Bolshevik seizure of power in October 1917 transformed the "dictatorship of the proletariat" from a theoretical concept into a practical political question. The Bolsheviks' interpretation and the reality of the Soviet regime fixed the term's modern meaning as a one-party state and triggered a final, decisive split in the international Marxist movement.

=== The Kautsky–Lenin split ===
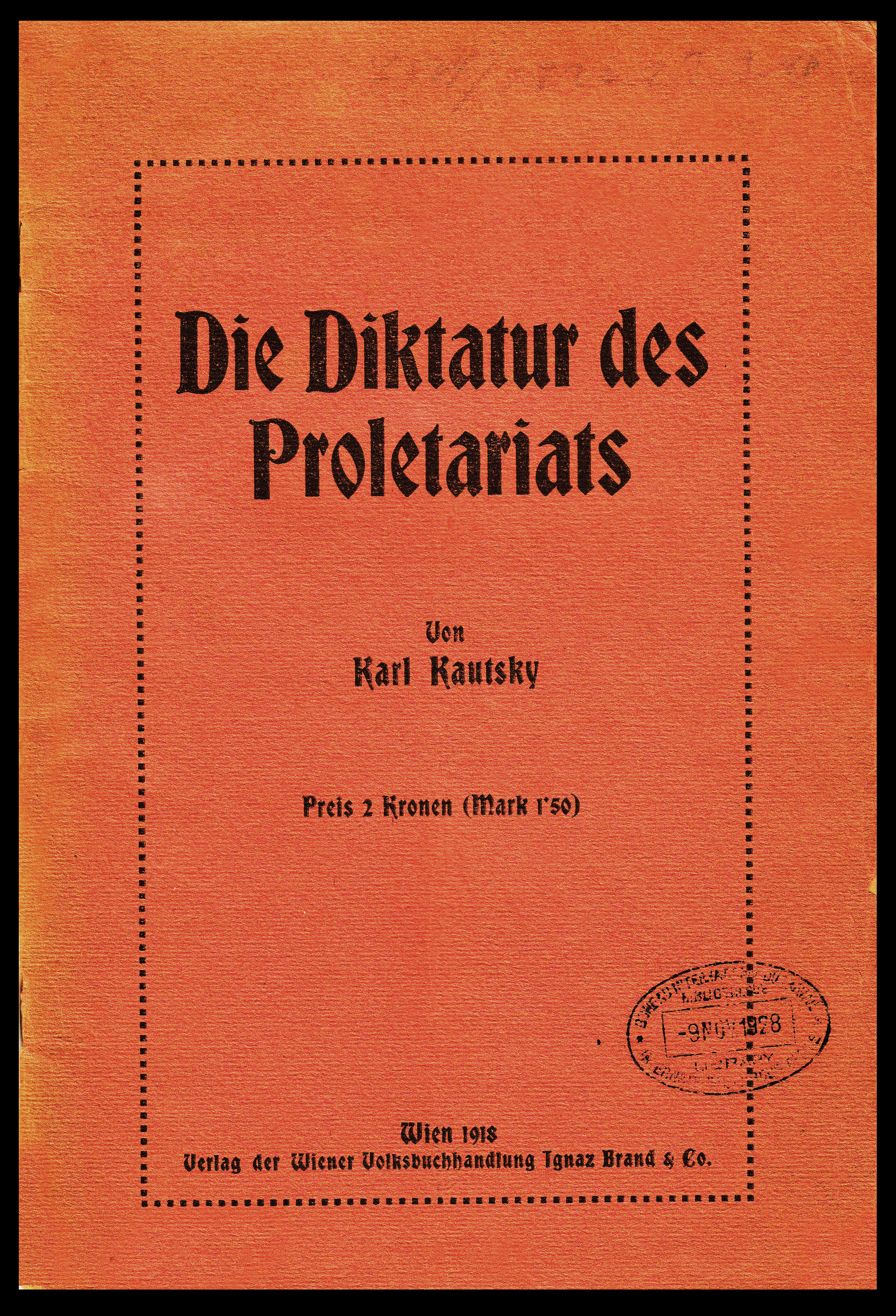
Cover of The Dictatorship of the Proletariat (1918) by Karl Kautsky

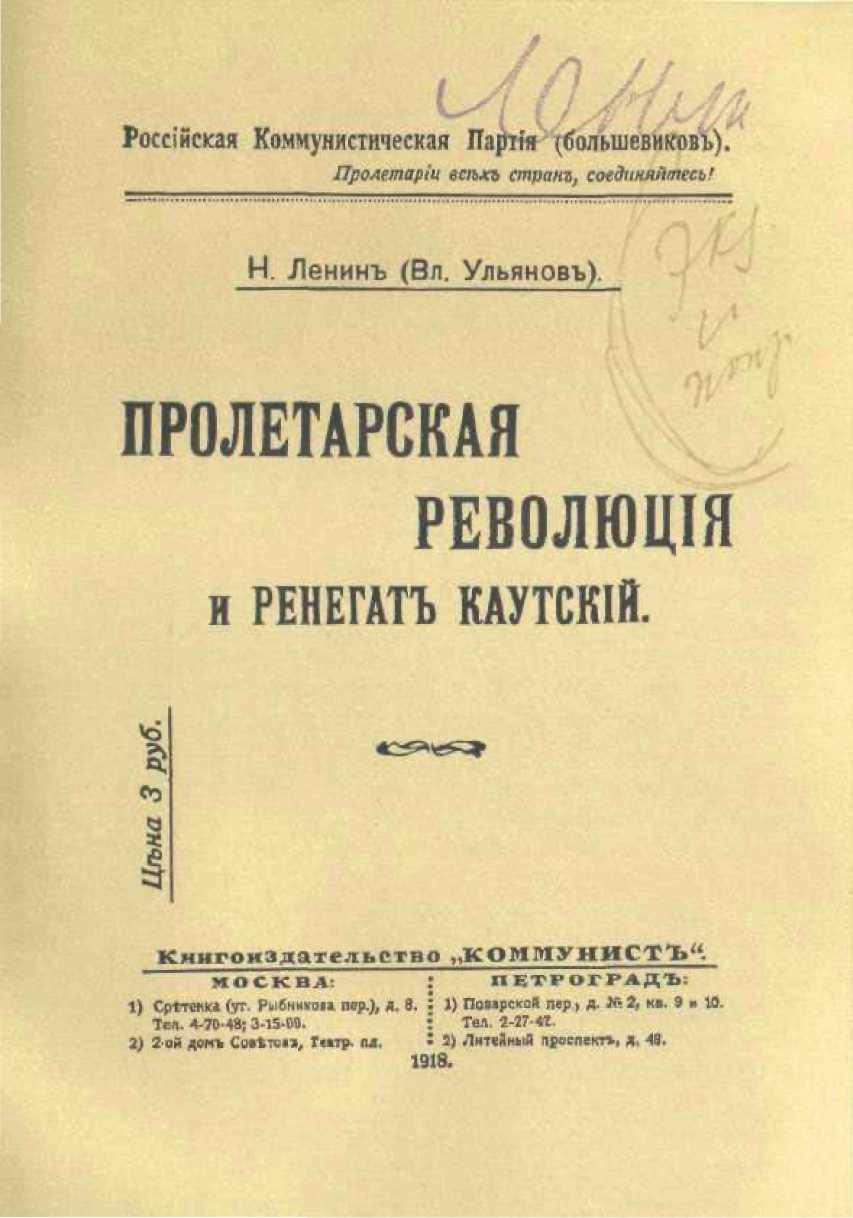
Title page of The Proletarian Revolution and the Renegade Kautsky (1918) by Vladimir Lenin

The sharpest conflict over the term broke out between Lenin and Karl Kautsky in 1918. In his pamphlet The Dictatorship of the Proletariat, Kautsky condemned the Bolshevik regime for suppressing other socialist parties, abolishing the Russian Constituent Assembly, and ruling by force without a democratic mandate. He argued that Marx's "dictatorship of the proletariat" referred to the class rule of a majority, exercised through a democratic republic, and was not a "form of government" that dispensed with democracy.

Lenin replied in The Proletarian Revolution and the Renegade Kautsky. He defended the Bolsheviks' actions as necessary and reiterated his 1906 definition of dictatorship as power won and maintained by force, unrestricted by any law. He derided Kautsky's appeal to "democracy" as "bourgeois democracy" and a betrayal of the revolution. By counterposing "dictatorship" to "democracy", Lenin argued for a class-based view: proletarian democracy (for the working class) required the dictatorship (suppression) over the bourgeoisie. Hunt notes that while Marx and Engels did use similar harsh language about the repressive functions of the workers' state, they did so assuming a "revolutionary Provisorium"—a temporary, extralegal period following a revolution where the old ruling class is engaged in violent resistance. They did not, however, advocate for the suppression of peaceful opposition. The Paris Commune, for example, tolerated a legal bourgeois opposition within its own assembly, and in an unpublished draft of The Civil War in France, Marx presupposed the continued existence of a legal bourgeois opposition under a national government of the Commune.

=== Luxemburg's critique ===
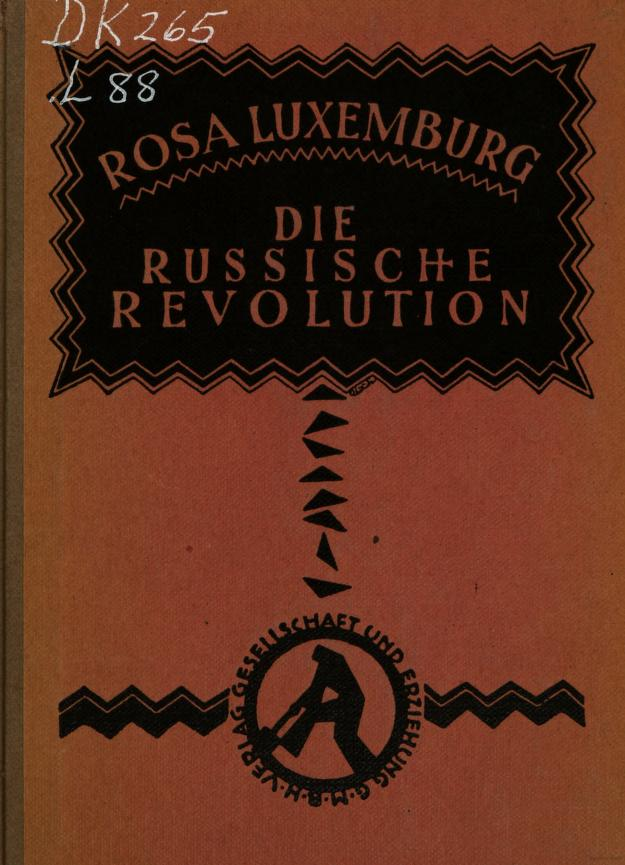
Cover of The Russian Revolution (written 1918; published 1922) by Rosa Luxemburg

Rosa Luxemburg, writing from a German prison in 1918, offered a third perspective in her essay on The Russian Revolution. While she defended the Bolsheviks' revolutionary actions, she sharply criticized their dictatorial policies. She argued that the dictatorship of the proletariat required "the most active, unlimited participation of the mass of the people, of unlimited democracy". She warned that the Bolsheviks' suppression of political life—by eliminating elections, freedom of the press, and assembly—would lead not to a workers' state but to the "dictatorship of a handful of politicians", a "bourgeois dictatorship in the Jacobin sense". She famously concluded: "Freedom only for the supporters of the government, only for the members of one party – however numerous they may be – is no freedom at all. Freedom is always and exclusively freedom for the one who thinks differently."

=== From class dictatorship to party dictatorship ===
In the crucible of the Russian Civil War, the concept of the dictatorship of the proletariat was explicitly fused with the idea of the dictatorship of the Bolshevik party. The devastation of the war led to the decimation of the Russian working class, rendering the mass-based democracy of the soviets impractical. By March 1919, Lenin acknowledged that the soviets had ceased to be organs of government by the working people, but were now organs of government for the working people, run by the "advanced section of the proletariat", i.e. the party. By 1920, leading Bolsheviks were openly arguing that the rule of the working class could only be realized through its vanguard party. Leon Trotsky, in his work Terrorism and Communism, wrote that it was possible to speak of "the dictatorship of the proletariat which is led by the dictatorship of its party". Similarly, Nikolai Bukharin argued that the "dictatorship of the proletariat is in essence the dictatorship of its vanguard", the Communist Party. Lenin stated in 1921 that the dictatorship of the proletariat was impossible "through an organisation embracing the whole of that class" because the proletariat was still too "divided, so degraded, and so corrupted". It could, therefore, "be exercised only by a vanguard that has absorbed the revolutionary energy of the class".

By the end of the civil war, the dictatorship of the proletariat had been transformed, in both theory and practice, into the dictatorship of the party, a conception that, according to Draper, was the opposite of what Marx had intended. This shift is summarized by Robert X. Ware, who contrasts Marx's conception of a dictatorship by the proletariat—meaning self-determination of the working class in opposition to rule by an elite or vanguard—with Lenin's view of a state that acts for the proletariat in a dictatorial manner. According to Hunt, this view was rooted in the Russian revolutionary tradition's idea of a vanguard, which Marx and Engels themselves consistently opposed. In their analysis of the revolutionary movement in Russia, they argued that revolution must be made "by a Nation", not "by a party", and they denounced the elitist and conspiratorial conceptions of figures like Bakunin.

In contrast to the narrative of a sharp break between Marx and Lenin, other scholars like John Ehrenberg argue for a fundamental continuity in their political theory. Ehrenberg contends that the dictatorship of the proletariat is the democratic core of Marxism, defining the entire transition from capitalism to communism. From this perspective, Lenin's work is not a "distortion" but an orthodox development and application of Marx and Engels's core principles to the specific conditions of revolutionary Russia. This interpretation emphasizes that for all three thinkers, the concept described the political power required to lead a comprehensive social revolution and "break" the old bourgeois state in favor of a new, more democratic form like the Paris Commune or the soviets.

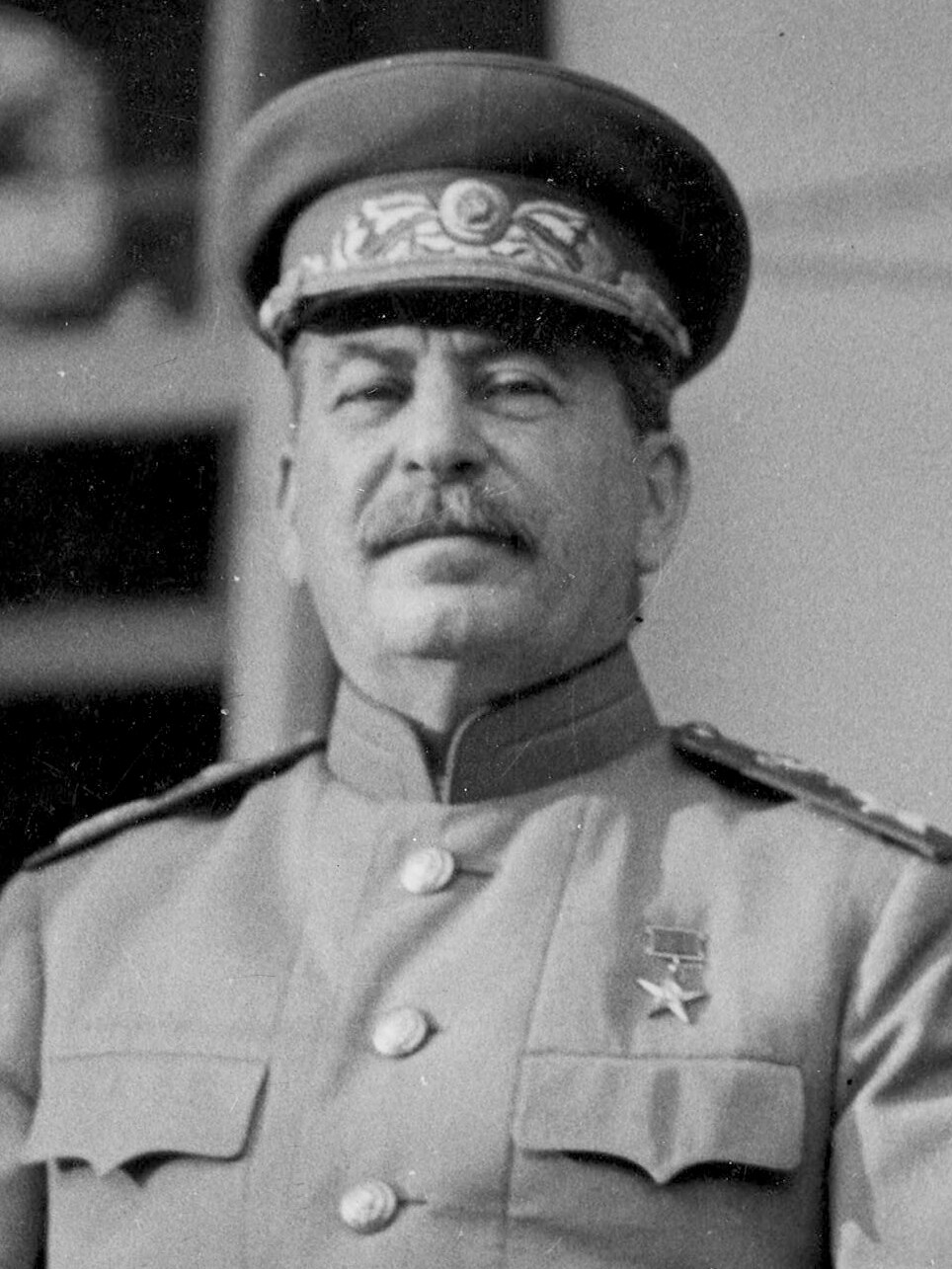
Joseph Stalin

Lenin's equation was formalized under Joseph Stalin. In 1926, he stated that the dictatorship of the proletariat "is in essence the 'dictatorship' of its vanguard, the 'dictatorship' of its Party, as the main guiding force of the proletariat". Under Stalin, the term was used to justify a system of mass repression and state terror. In the 1936 Soviet Constitution, the state was officially redefined as a "socialist state of workers and peasants", a formula which increasingly replaced the term "dictatorship of the proletariat", consigning it to a past historical period.

== Later usage and evolution of the concept ==
=== Abandonment in Western social democracy ===
After World War II, the rise of the Soviet Union and the onset of the Cold War cemented the association of "dictatorship of the proletariat" with one-party communist rule. In Western Europe, mainstream socialist and social democratic parties, where they came to power, followed a distinct path of reform within capitalism rather than revolutionary socialism. This led to a new wave of revisionism in the 1950s, which attacked the classical socialist goal of abolishing the private ownership of the means of production. According to historian Donald Sassoon, this new revisionism "prided itself on its pragmatism and realism while being, at the same time, deeply ethical" but "deliberately rejected Marxism" and its theoretical intransigence.

This ideological transformation was exemplified by the German Social Democratic Party's 1959 Godesberg Program. The party abandoned Marxist theories of class struggle and revolution, redefining its goal as a "social market economy" and its philosophical basis as "rooted in Christian ethics, humanism and classical philosophy". In Britain, the revisionist wing of the Labour Party, particularly the theorist Anthony Crosland in The Future of Socialism (1956), argued that classical capitalism had been transformed into a new system. He contended that the central issue was no longer public ownership versus private ownership, but the pursuit of social equality and welfare within a managed mixed economy. By the end of the 1950s, this formal or informal abandonment of Marxist doctrine had become a common feature of almost all Western European socialist parties. This shift meant that the concept of a "dictatorship of the proletariat", along with the associated goal of revolutionary overthrow of the capitalist state, was decisively rejected by mainstream Western social democracy.

=== Evolution in the Soviet bloc ===
In the Soviet bloc, the term's official status also evolved. After World War II, communist states were established in Eastern Europe as "people's democracies". Initially, these were presented as a distinct, multi-class path to socialism different from the Soviet model. However, after the 1948 split with Yugoslavia, this doctrine was abandoned. By 1949, the people's democracies were officially redefined as a form of the dictatorship of the proletariat, and the Soviet model was declared obligatory for all.

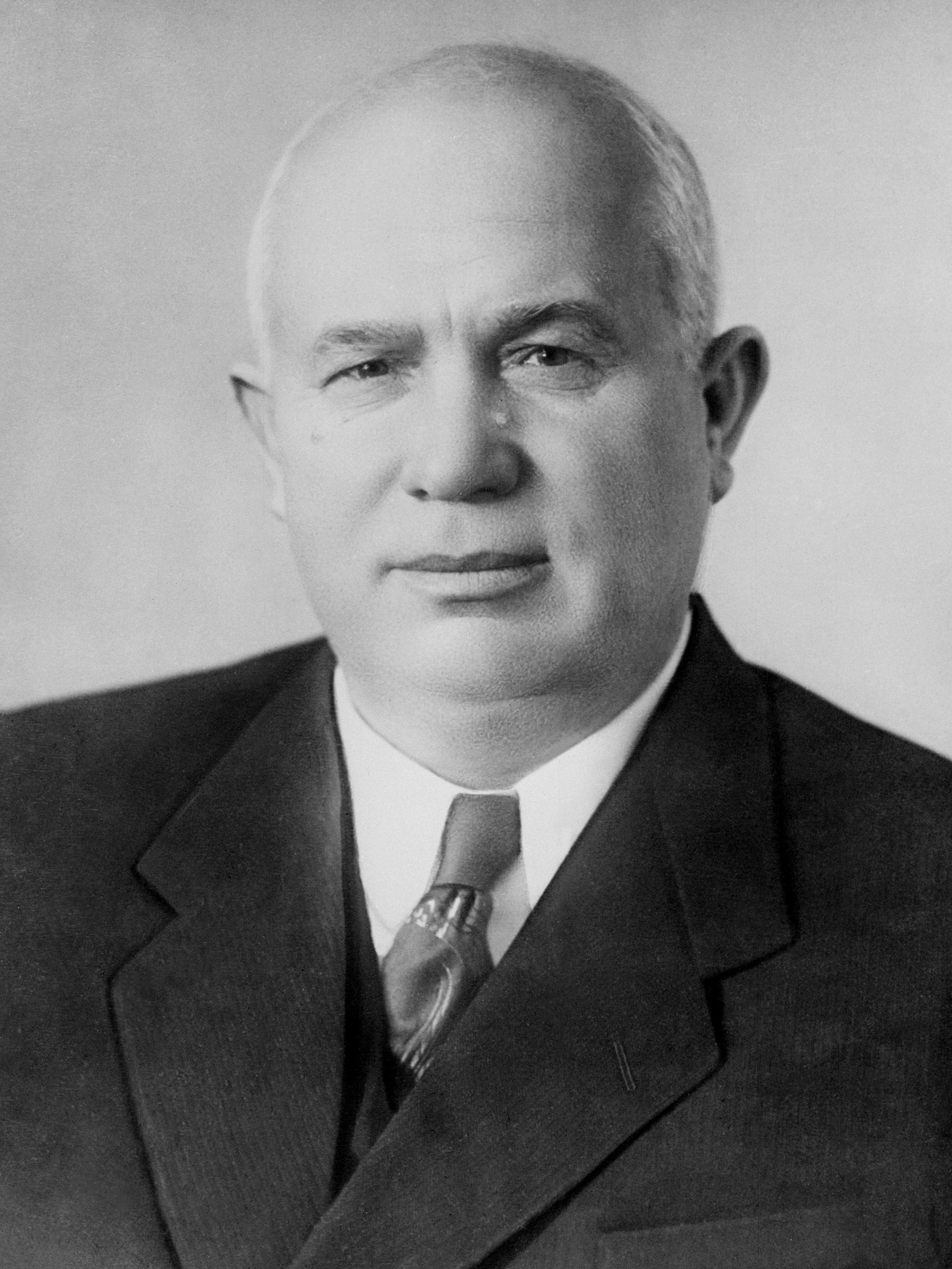
Nikita Khrushchev

A major theoretical shift occurred after Stalin's death. At the 22nd Congress of the Communist Party in 1961, Nikita Khrushchev announced that the dictatorship of the proletariat had "fulfilled its historic mission" and was no longer necessary in the Soviet Union. The class nature of the state was redefined: the USSR was now considered a "state of the whole people". The stated objective was the construction of a consumer society to compete peacefully with the West, and the new heroes were to be the "experts and the technical intelligentsia", not the industrial proletariat.

=== Intra-communist critiques ===
The concept was a major point of contention within the world communist movement, particularly after de-Stalinization.

==== Yugoslav critique ====
After their break with Moscow in 1948, the League of Communists of Yugoslavia developed a sustained critique of the Soviet interpretation. They argued against the Stalinist identification of the dictatorship of the proletariat with the terrorist rule of a single party. Yugoslav theorists interpreted the concept in a much broader sense, not as a specific form of state but as the "social, i.e. class-political, substance" of power. They argued that its forms could be diverse, ranging from "revolutionary dictatorship to parliamentary government in which the working class ... wields decisive influence", and must adapt to different national and historical conditions.

==== Chinese critique ====
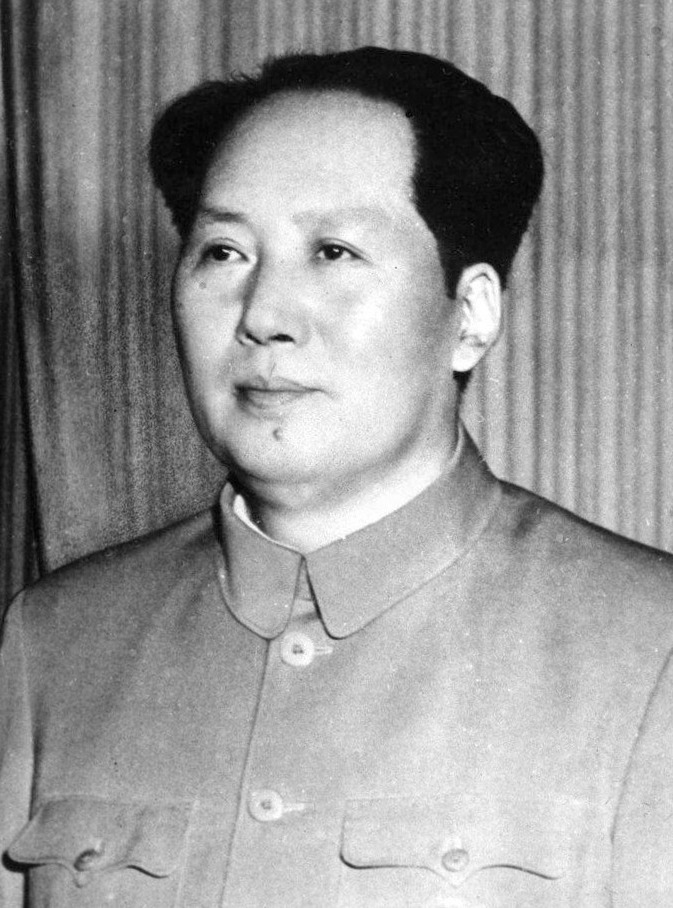
Mao Zedong

The Chinese Communist Party, under Mao Zedong, vehemently rejected the Soviet Union's abandonment of the concept. The Chinese directed their criticism principally at the new Soviet thesis of the "state of the whole people". They labeled this a "betrayal" of Marxism and a "hoax" designed to cover up Khrushchev's "revisionism". According to the Chinese view, the dictatorship of the proletariat must continue throughout the entire transition to communism, because class struggle persists. They claimed that the USSR had not achieved a classless society, but had instead generated "new capitalist elements". Consequently, they argued that Khrushchev had not abolished the dictatorship of the proletariat, but had replaced it with a "dictatorship of the revisionist clique" and a "dictatorship of a privileged stratum of the Soviet bourgeoisie" over the masses.

In the late Maoist period, the concept was used to attack moderate economic policies and "bourgeois right". After Mao's death, the leadership under Deng Xiaoping replaced the term with the "people's democratic dictatorship", officially defining it as essentially the same but better suited to China's conditions. While exploiting classes were declared eliminated, Deng maintained that a "special form" of class struggle persisted, requiring a dictatorship to suppress "anti-socialist elements". During the 1980s, radical reformers increasingly criticized the concept, linking it to "feudal despotism" and an overemphasis on coercion. Some eventually called for a state representing "all citizens", renouncing its "proletarian bias", and by the end of the decade, the language of individual rights had largely replaced class terminology in reformist discourse. Following the 1989 Tiananmen Square protests and massacre, the phrase "dictatorship of the proletariat" re-emerged in official discourse as the leadership sought to reassert its doctrinal authority.

=== Eurocommunism ===
In the 1970s, the concept of Eurocommunism gained influence among some Western communist parties as a democratic alternative to the Leninist model. It represented an attempt to forge a "third way" between Soviet-style socialism and social democracy. The Italian Communist Party (PCI), under Enrico Berlinguer, was the leading proponent of this strategy. Berlinguer theorized a "Historic Compromise" (compromesso storico), arguing that a left-wing government in a capitalist country could not survive with only a slim majority (the "51 percent"). Instead, it required a broad social and political coalition incorporating progressive Catholic forces, as represented by Italy's Christian Democracy party. This strategy aimed to defend and expand democracy through structural reforms within the existing state, explicitly rejecting a revolutionary seizure of power.

At its peak of influence, after securing 34.4 percent of the vote in the 1976 general election, the PCI provided external support to the Christian Democratic government in a period of "national solidarity" but never entered the cabinet. The strategy ultimately failed, undermined by the kidnapping and murder of Christian Democratic leader Aldo Moro by the Red Brigades in 1978 and the hostility of both the United States and the Soviet Union. Following the Revolutions of 1989, the PCI formally dissolved itself and refounded as the Democratic Party of the Left, joining the Socialist International. Other parties also moved away from Leninist orthodoxy. The French Communist Party (PCF) officially dropped the "dictatorship of the proletariat" at its 22nd Congress in 1976, while the Communist Party of Spain (PCE) under Santiago Carrillo followed a similar Eurocommunist path.

== Historiography ==
According to Hal Draper, the modern misunderstanding of the "dictatorship of the proletariat" as a form of one-party rule or minority dictatorship began with the German Social-Democrat Eduard Bernstein at the turn of the 20th century. Bernstein, the founder of revisionism in Marxism, sought to portray Marx's revolutionary phase as an immature "Blanquist" aberration. He claimed that Marx's advocacy for revolution was based not on a scientific understanding of historical necessity but on "the apotheosis of pure Will as the revolutionary drive", a voluntaristic view he identified with Blanquism. By this logic, anyone who advocated for revolution was a "Blanquist", regardless of their views on minority coups or party dictatorships.

Draper argues that Bernstein created a "fable" by asserting that The Communist Manifesto was "Blanquist through and through" and that Marx only shook off Blanquism after the failed revolutions of 1848. This interpretation, Draper maintains, is based on a falsification of the historical record and an ignorance of Marx's consistent critique of putschism and conspiratorial politics. The "Marx-Blanquist myth" was subsequently taken up by other writers, including both reformist socialists and anti-Marxists, and became a common feature of "Marxological" scholarship. Draper critiques later historians like George Lichtheim and Bertram D. Wolfe for perpetuating this myth, often without providing any evidence beyond Bernstein's original assertions.

== See also ==
- Democracy in Marxism
- Marx's theory of the state
- Withering away of the state
