= The Dictatorship of the Proletariat (pamphlet) =

1918 pamphlet by Karl Kautsky

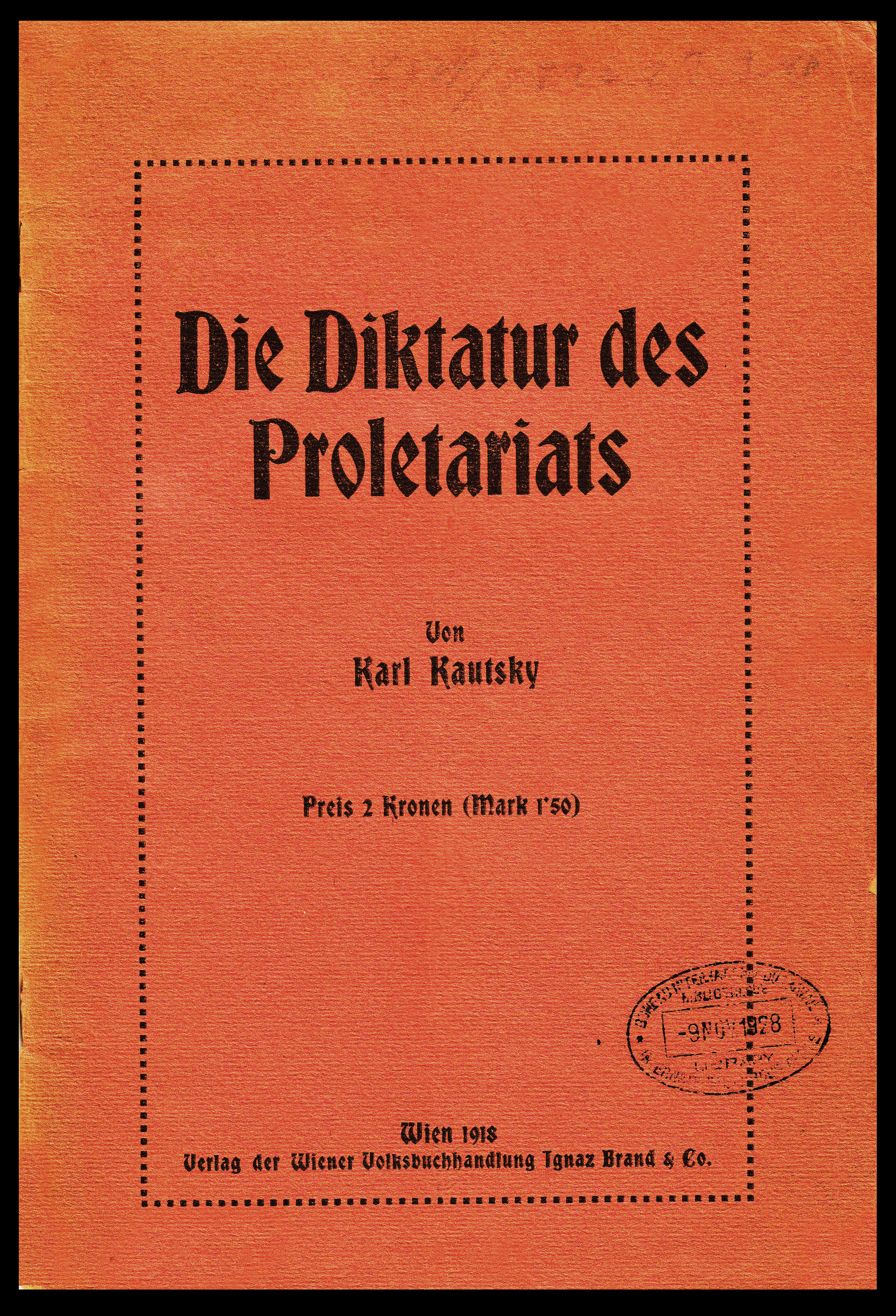
The Dictatorship of the Proletariat was published by Karl Kautsky in 1918.

The Dictatorship of the Proletariat (published in German as Die Diktatur des Proletariats) is a 1918 pamphlet by prominent Marxist Karl Kautsky. The work criticizes the Bolsheviks, arguing they eschewed democracy in favor of military force when establishing the Russian SFSR.

In this work, Kautsky argues that "the antagonism of the two Socialist movements [i.e., Bolshevism and non-Bolshevism] is not based on small personal jealousies: it is the clashing of two fundamentally distinct methods, that of democracy and that of dictatorship." Kautsky concludes that the Bolshevik understanding of "dictatorship of the proletariat" does "not promise good results for the proletariat, either from the standpoint of theory or from that of the special Russian conditions."

== Response and reception ==
In response to The Dictatorship of the Proletariat, Vladimir Lenin wrote The Proletarian Revolution and the Renegade Kautsky (1918), in which Lenin argued that the Russian Revolution had proceeded in the only way possible and that it had engendered, rather than curtailed, democracy. Kautsky subsequently responded to Lenin's counterattack with a second pamphlet, Terrorism and Communism (1919), in which he argued that "the Bolsheviks ... survived not as socialists but as architects of a bourgeois regime". Leon Trotsky then replied to Kautsky with a work also titled Terrorism and Communism (1920).

The historian Fernando Claudín later characterized The Dictatorship of the Proletariat and Kautsky's Terrorism and Communism as "the two basic texts of the Kautskyan assault on Bolshevism".
