= Bourgeois right =

Marxist concept for ideological remnants of capitalism

Bourgeois right is a Marxist term used to describe the ideological remnants of capitalism which remain in a socialist society. In Karl Marx's works, the concept is discussed primarily in A Critique of the Gotha Programme and also mentioned in Capital. According to Mao Zedong, examples of the ideology of bourgeois right include competing for ranks, seeking bonuses, and disparate wages between manual workers and mental workers.

== History ==
Bourgeois right was a concept discussed by Marx which referred to the capitalist remnants in the socialist society. It was represented as the sale of commodities in a market, and the distribution to work, which would produce inequalities because of the unequal distribution of skills and capacities in the work force.

In Marx's work, the concept of bourgeois right (bürgerliche Recht) is primarily addressed in Critique of the Gotha Programme and is mentioned briefly in Capital. In Critique of the Gotha Programme, Marx introduced bourgeois right as part of his criticism of those like Ferdinand Lassalle who contended that after capitalism, remuneration would be given according to a fair distribution of the proceeds of labor.

Responding to this idea, Marx described the transition from a capitalist society to a socialist society, the first stage of communism. Marx wrote that workers would not receive, in the form of rights to consumption, their own contribution to the total social product because their contribution would necessarily be reduced by what is necessary for accumulation and to support those unable to labor. Marx contended that although the post-capitalist society could not be understood in terms of value and commodity production, it would still not yet reach the communist model of from each according to his ability, to each according to his needs. Marx wrote a society having emerged from the cultural and ideological conditions of capitalism would still be "stamped with the birthmarks of the old society from whose whom it emerges." According to Marx, the mode of distribution in such a society is the "equal right" or "bourgeois right".

Mao's discussion of the bourgeois right analyzed the limitations of the Soviet-derived model that had influenced the Chinese approach in the early 1950s, particularly how changing ownership through socialism does not eliminate problems of social relations under socialism. At the Beidaihe Conference (1958), he stated, "We must smash the ideology of bourgeois right, for example, the competing for position, the competing over ranks, seeking bonuses, the fact that mental laborers earn higher wages and manual workers lower wages, all of these are manifestations of bourgeois right." Mao stated later that year that people's communes could be an important mechanism for overcoming the ideology of bourgeois right, because "[t]he People's communes are carrying out a wage system and a supply system under which wages are paid to each individual, not to the family head. This makes women and young people happy, and it's a way of smashing the patriarchal system, and the ideology of bourgeois right."

After the 1958 Beidaihe Conference, Zhang Chunqiao's article Smash the Ideology of Bourgeois Right became prominent after its publication in the journal Liberation and was republished by Mao's request in People's Daily in October 1958. Zhang praised the Red Army's egalitarian focus in the 1930s, including its communist mutual relations not just internally but with the masses. According to Zhang, "When comrades lived used to live under the supply system they did not envy wage labor, and people liked this kind of expression of a living institution of relations of equality. Before long, however, this kind of system was attacked by the ideology of bourgeois right. The core of the ideology of the bourgeois right is the wage system."

The People's Liberation Army (PLA) was viewed an important mechanism for developing communist spirit, including for overcoming the ideology of the bourgeois right. The early 1964 People's Daily editorial The Whole Country Must Study the People's Liberation Army stated that the PLA had nationwide significance in opposing the bourgeois right because PLA soldiers "are full of public spirit and reject narrow interest, and they selflessly strive for the public and disregard themselves, they work solely for others rather than for themselves, and even devote their youth and lives to socialism."

In its 1964 proposal to abolish ranks in the PLA, the Central Military Commission stated that ranks were an expression of bourgeois right and hierarchy which led to individualist attitudes, inequality, and a sense of disunity. Ranks were abolished the next year; they remained abolished until they were re-instated in 1988.
