= The Proletarian Revolution and the Renegade Kautsky =

1918 book by Vladimir Lenin

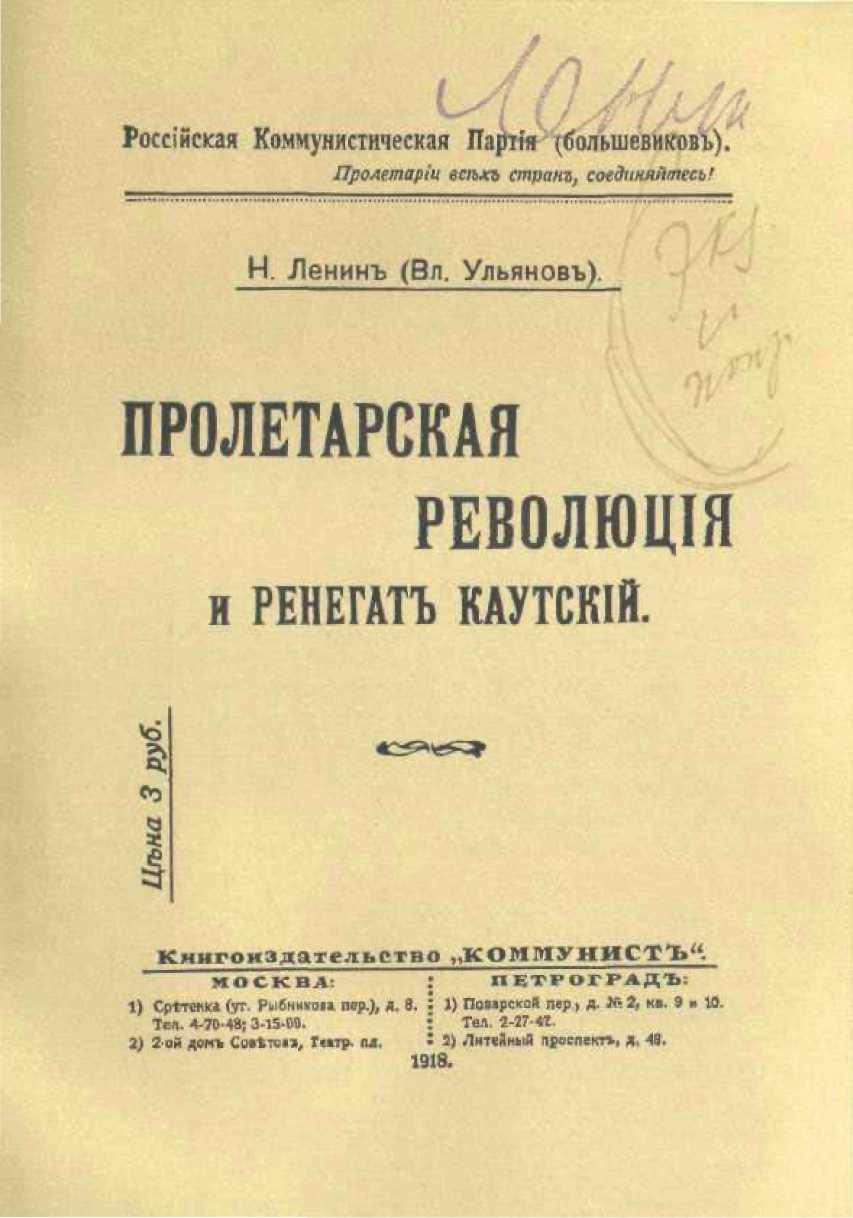
Cover of the first edition

The Proletarian Revolution and the Renegade Kautsky (Note: Russian: Пролетарская революция и ренегат Каутский, romanized: Proletarskaya revolyutsiya i renegat Kautskiy) (PRRK) is a political pamphlet written in October-November 1918 by Vladimir Lenin. In this work, he defends the newly formed Soviet government against criticisms leveled against it by Karl Kautsky, a leader of the Independent Social Democratic Party of Germany (USPD) and the Second International, and also a mentor to many Bolsheviks.

The prime motivation for writing PRRK was Kautsky's pamphlet The Dictatorship of the Proletariat published earlier in 1918. Kautsky had condemned the dictatorial actions taken by the Communist Party of the Soviet Union as a deviation from socialist principles. Lenin responded by stating that the need for dictatorship was a core Marxist concept, found in numerous places in the works of Marx and Engels, and that Kautsky's disapproval showed how a once-great Marxist theoretician had become a "renegade".

The back-and-forth between Lenin and Kautsky was part of a worldwide debate raging among Marxists—in the wake of the Bolshevik Revolution—about the role of democracy and force in the transition to socialism.

== Background ==
Lenin's suspicions about Kautsky dated back to the start of World War I. Although the latter did not join the SPD's "capitulation of German social democracy to German imperialism in August 1914", he adopted what Lenin termed a "social-pacifist" position that indicated a drift away from revolutionary Marxism. The complete rupture between the two men occurred in August 1918 when Kautsky published The Dictatorship of the Proletariat in Vienna. The fact that Lenin responded within weeks with PRRK was a testament to the importance of the issues at stake, and how Kautsky still "enjoyed great authority among socialists of all countries".

== Synopsis ==
The main argument in PRRK is that Kautsky distorted Karl Marx's and Friedrich Engels' ideas on democracy and its relation to socialism and revolution. In the first chapter, "How Kautsky Turned Marx into a Common Liberal", Lenin attacks Kautsky's usage of the term "pure democracy". Lenin says it is absurd "to talk about 'pure democracy' in a class-divided society", that there is "bourgeois democracy" and "proletarian democracy", but there is no "pure democracy". He writes:

It is natural for a liberal to speak of "democracy" in general; but a Marxist will never forget to ask: "for what class?" Everyone knows, for instance (and Kautsky the "historian" knows it too), that rebellions, or even strong ferment, among the slaves in ancient times at once revealed the fact that the ancient state was essentially a dictatorship of the slave owners. Did this dictatorship abolish democracy among, and for, the slave owners? Everybody knows that it did not. Kautsky the "Marxist" made this monstrously absurd and untrue statement because he "forgot" the class struggle....

Following this line of reasoning, Lenin characterizes the Soviet system as democracy for the proletariat, and dictatorship for the overthrown bourgeoisie.

PRRK is structured as a long polemic, with many insults lobbed at Kautsky. For example, after citing Kautsky's allegation that Bolsheviks have "contempt for democracy", Lenin writes:

That is the sort of twaddle Kautsky uses to befog and confuse the issue, for he talks like the liberals, speaking of democracy in general, and not of bourgeois democracy; he even avoids using this precise, class term, and, instead, tries to speak about "presocialist" democracy. This windbag devotes almost one-third of his pamphlet, twenty pages out of sixty-three, to this twaddle, which is so agreeable to the bourgeoisie, for it is tantamount to embellishing bourgeois democracy, and obscures the question of the proletarian revolution.

The next area of disagreement relates to universal suffrage. Kautsky suggested that a socialist state should rule via universal suffrage and parliamentary democracy since "[t]he most effective weapon of the proletariat is its numerical strength", i.e., the working masses are the majority of the population and hence will win every election. For him, universal suffrage was "the means of reconciling democracy and socialism". Lenin replies in PRRK that "Kautsky the historian has never heard that universal suffrage sometimes produces petty-bourgeois, sometimes reactionary and counter-revolutionary parliaments." In a chapter titled "Can There Be Equality Between the Exploited and the Exploiter?", Lenin argues that a newly formed socialist state is not a level playing field in which political power can be decided by elections:

For a long time after the revolution the exploiters inevitably continue to retain a number of great practical advantages: they still have money (since it is impossible to abolish money all at once); some movable property—often fairly considerable; they still have various connections, habits of organisation and management; knowledge of all the "secrets" (customs, methods, means and possibilities) of management; superior education; close connections with the higher technical personnel (who live and think like the bourgeoisie); incomparably greater experience in the art of war (this is very important), and so on and so forth. If the exploiters are defeated in one country only—and this, of course, is typical, since a simultaneous revolution in a number of countries is a rare exception—they still remain stronger than the exploited, for the international connections of the exploiters are enormous.

A key complaint raised by Kautsky pertained to the Russian Constituent Assembly and whether its dispersal by the Bolsheviks "destroyed democracy". Lenin calls this complaint the "crux" of Kautsky's pamphlet, and adds that it is an important and interesting question "because the relation between bourgeois democracy and proletarian democracy here confronted the revolution in a practical form." Lenin was particularly incensed by Kautsky's assertion that the decision to disband the Constituent Assembly was arrived at only after the Bolsheviks found themselves in the minority. Lenin insists that since his return to Russia in April 1917, he had consistently written and spoken against the Constituent Assembly and "proclaimed the superiority of the Paris Commune type of [workers] state over the bourgeois parliamentary republic." He then asks rhetorically, "Is it true or not that the bourgeois-democratic parliamentary republic is inferior to the republic of the Paris Commune or Soviet type? This is the whole point, and Kautsky has evaded it. Kautsky has 'forgotten' all that Marx said in his analysis of the Paris Commune." As Jukka Gronow writes, "Lenin never tired of repeating the claim that proletarian democracy is a million times more democratic than any form of bourgeois democracy."

== Reactions ==
Kautsky replied to Lenin's attacks, first in 1920 with his book Terrorism and Communism: A Contribution to the Natural History of Revolution. Then, in Marxism and Bolshevism: Democracy and Dictatorship (1934), he wrote that the Bolsheviks, by taking control of the armed forces in Petrograd and Moscow, had simply laid the basis for a new dictatorship in place of the old Czarist autocracy.

For 20th century revolutionaries, PRRK became a foundational text. Historians of the Chinese Communist Revolution have noted the pamphlet's influence on Mao Zedong's thinking, citing as one instance the adoption by Mao of the principle that a victorious socialist revolution must immediately dissolve the existing bourgeois army and replace it with a proletarian army.

Starting in the late 1960s, together with the development of Neoliberalism, some scholars linked to the University of Chicago challenged Lenin's view expressed in PRRK that Kautsky was "a defector from the working-class cause." Instead, they argued that (a) there were greater points of convergence between the two men's positions than Lenin gave credit for, and (b) Kautsky remained, in certain ways, more of an orthodox Marxist theorist than Lenin.

== See also ==
- The Dictatorship of the Proletariat
- Terrorism and Communism
- Vladimir Lenin bibliography
