= Robert Kautsky =

Austrian theatre painter, stage and costume designer

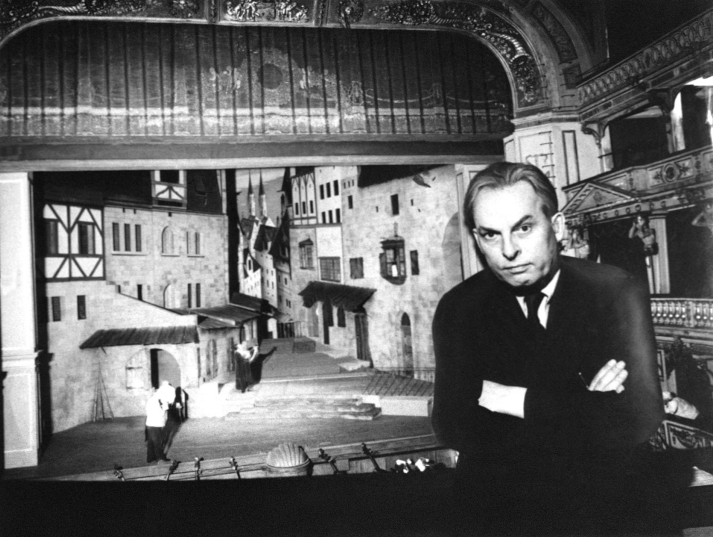
Robert Kautsky with one of his stage designs for Die Meistersinger von Nürnberg, Vienna 1949

Robert Kautsky (26 October 1895 – 18 June 1963) was an Austrian theatre painter, stage designer, and costume designer, who worked for many years at the Vienna State Opera and at the Salzburg Festival.

== Life and work ==
Born in Vienna, Kautsky came from a family of theatre painters and actors. His grandfather Johann Kautsky (1827–1896) was a painter and stage designer in Prague, his grandmother was the actress and writer Minna Kautsky (1837–1912). His father, Hans Joseph Wilhelm Kautsky (1864–1937), was a royal Austrian and royal Prussian court theatre painter in Vienna and Berlin. His eldest brother Hans Kautsky (1891–1966) became a famous chemist, and his second brother Fritz worked as a geologist in Sweden. His uncle was the social democratic theorist Karl Kautsky (1854–1938), married to Luise Kautsky.

Kautsky graduated from the Gymnasium in Vienna and then went to the academy in Berlin-Charlottenburg. After the end of the First World War, he studied at the Academy of Fine Arts Vienna.

His grandfather Johann Kautsky was a highly respected stage painter who decorated numerous new productions of the Vienna Court Opera in the 1870s and 1880s. For example, he designed the sets for the Vienna premiere of Meyerbeer's L'Africaine in 1870 and, together with Carlo Brioschi and Hermann Burghart, designed the scenery for two other important Viennese premieres: Verdi's Aida in 1874 and Wagner's Siegfried in 1878. The sets of L'Africaine could still be seen at the Vienna Opera until 1903, those of Aida until December 1931. The grandson followed in his grandfather's footsteps and worked for the Vienna State Opera already in 1920, at the age of 25. He was in charge of the "Decorative set with use of the original Italian designs" for Puccini's comic opera Gianni Schicchi. In 1921, he became director of the painters' hall at the Vienna State Opera. In the same year he married Rosa Krupha. In 1924 he became a member of the Kunstgemeinschaft Wien.

For many years he assisted the legendary set designer Alfred Roller and was jointly responsible for the decorations for Feuersnot by Richard Strauss in March 1922. In December of the same year, his first independent set had its premiere, Engelbert Humperdinck's fairy-tale opera Hänsel und Gretel, staged by Woldemar Runge and conducted by Richard Strauss. He had a long-standing collaboration with the composer and conductor, both in Vienna, where Kautsky set Arabella, Ariadne auf Naxos and the Der Rosenkavalier, among others, and in Salzburg. Like Strauss, Kautsky was active in Vienna and Salzburg throughout all the system changes – from the first Austrian Republic to the Ständestaat and the Anschluss to the Second Austrian Republic. It is not known how far he came to terms with the Nazi regime.

He debuted at the Salzburg Festival, again with Roller, in 1933 for another Richard Strauss premiere, Die ägyptische Helena. He worked with a number of renowned conductors and directors in Salzburg, most recently with Oscar Fritz Schuh for a new Così fan tutte in 1947. Kautsky's most successful productions were created in the post-war years at the Staatsoper's temporary quarters, at the Volksoper and at the Theater an der Wien. The sets for Beethoven's Fidelio were used in 145 performances, those for Offenbach's The Tales of Hoffmann 216 times. Both productions were made in 1945, the Fidelio was directed by Erich von Wymetal, the Offenbach opera by Oscar Fritz Schuh. His Aida production from 1946 reached 290 performances, the new production of the magic flute from 1948 was shown 239 times, Der Rosenkavalier from 1955 a total of 175 times.

Three quite different works are recorded in the archives as the last stage sets at the State Opera in 1960: Andrea Chénier in May, Capriccio in June and Der Wildschütz in October. The decorations of Capriccio remained in the State Opera's repertoire until 1997, 33 years after Kautsky' death in Leoben at the age of 67.

== Stage designs for the Salzburg Festival ==
- 1933: Die ägyptische Helena, conductor: Clemens Krauss, staging: Lothar Wallerstein (stage design together with Alfred Roller, auch 1934)
- 1935: Falstaff, conductor: Arturo Toscanini, staging: Guido Salvini (until 1939)
- 1936: Orfeo ed Euridice, conductor: Bruno Walter, staging: Margarete Wallmann (also in1937)
- 1936: Die Meistersinger von Nürnberg, conductor: Arturo Toscanini, staging: Herbert Graf (until 1938)
- 1936: Der Corregidor, conductor: Bruno Walter, staging: Lothar Wallerstein
- 1938: Tannhäuser, conductor: Hans Knappertsbusch, staging: Max Hofmüller
- 1938: Don Giovanni, conductor: Karl Böhm, staging: Wolf Völker (also in 1939)
- 1939: Die Entführung aus dem Serail, conductor: Karl Böhm, staging: Wolf Völker
- 1941: Don Giovanni, conductor: Karl Böhm, staging: Walter Felsenstein
- 1942: Arabella, conductor: Clemens Krauss, staging: Rudolf Hartmann (also in 1943 and 1947)
- 1947: Così fan tutte, conductor: Josef Krips, staging: Oscar Fritz Schuh
