= Kautsky (surname) =

Kautsky is a surname. Notable people with the name include:

- Frank Kautsky (1888–1959), American farmer, grocery store owner, and sports executive
- Johann Kautsky (1827–1896), Czech-Austrian scenic designer and landscape painter
- Karl Kautsky (1854–1938), Austrian-born Marxist theorist
- Luise Kautsky (1864–1944), German politician
- Minna Kautsky (1837–1912), Czech-Austrian actress and novelist
- Robert Kautsky (1895–1963), Austrian theatre painter, stage designer, and costume designer

== See also ==
- Indianapolis Kautskys, later the Indianapolis Jets, an American basketball team owned by Frank Kautsky
- Kautsky effect in biophysics, co-discoverer by H. Kautsky in 1931
