= Anton Brioschi =

Austrian painter, scenic designer and graphic artist

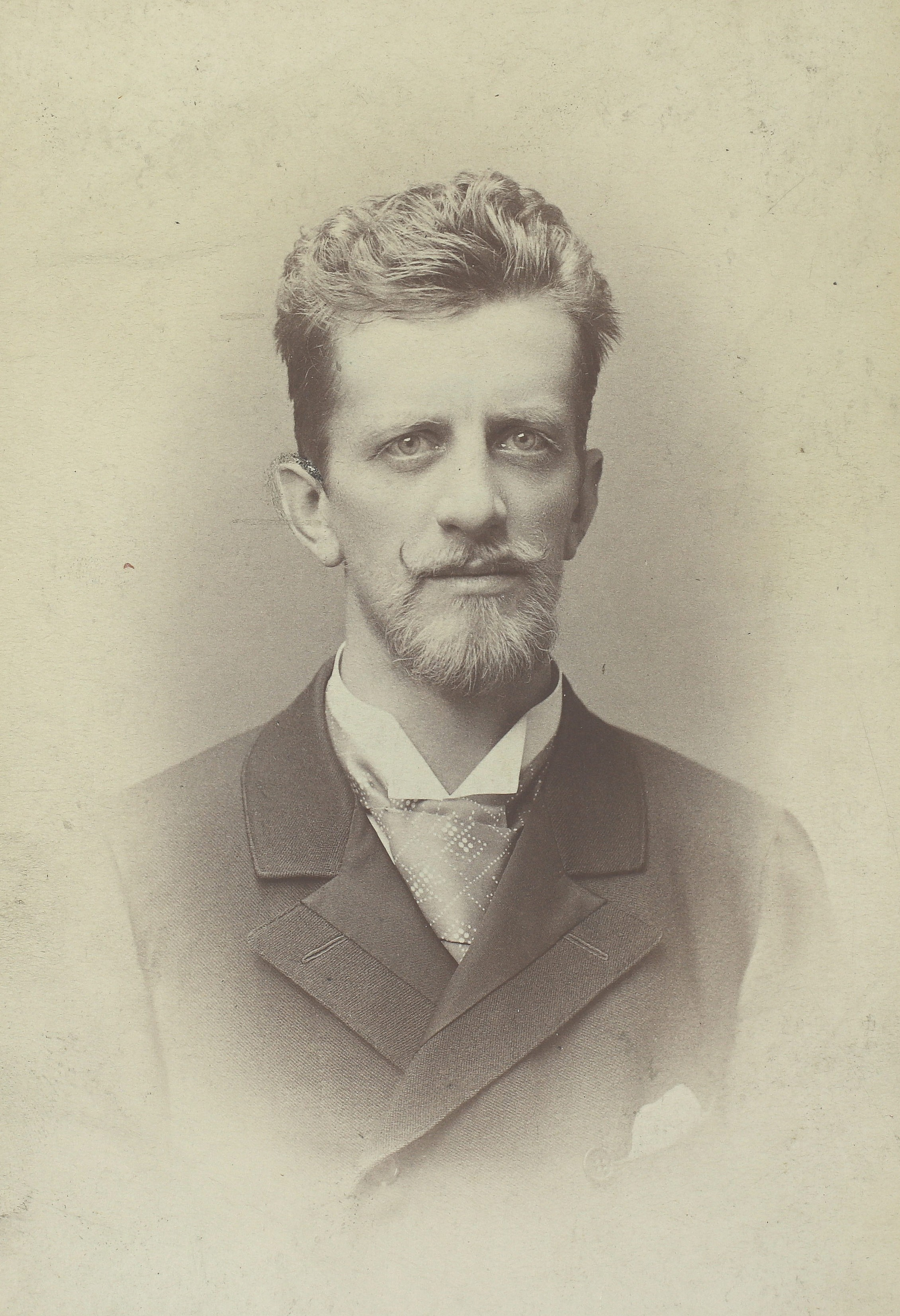
Brioschi in 1895

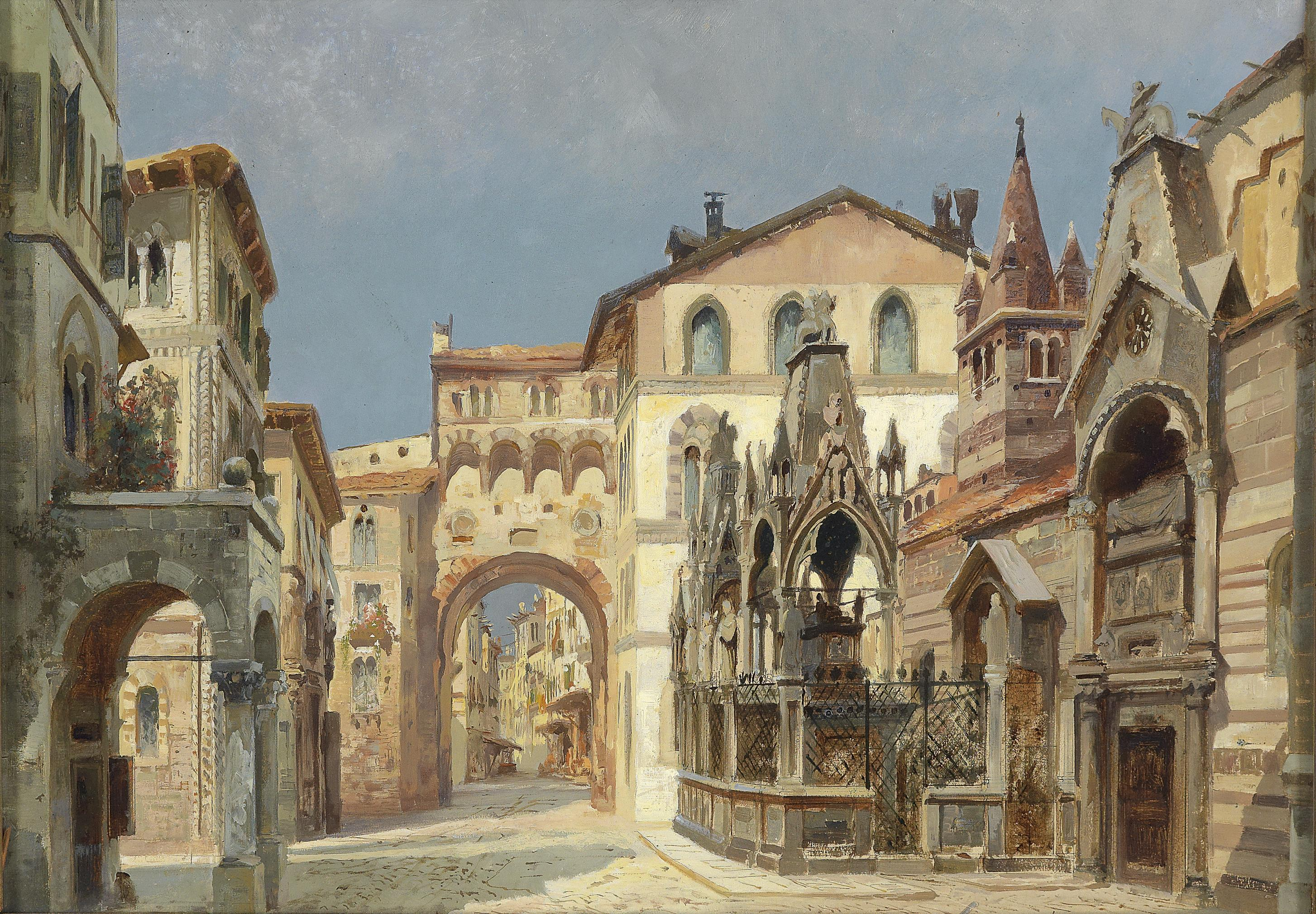
The Scaliger Tombs, Verona

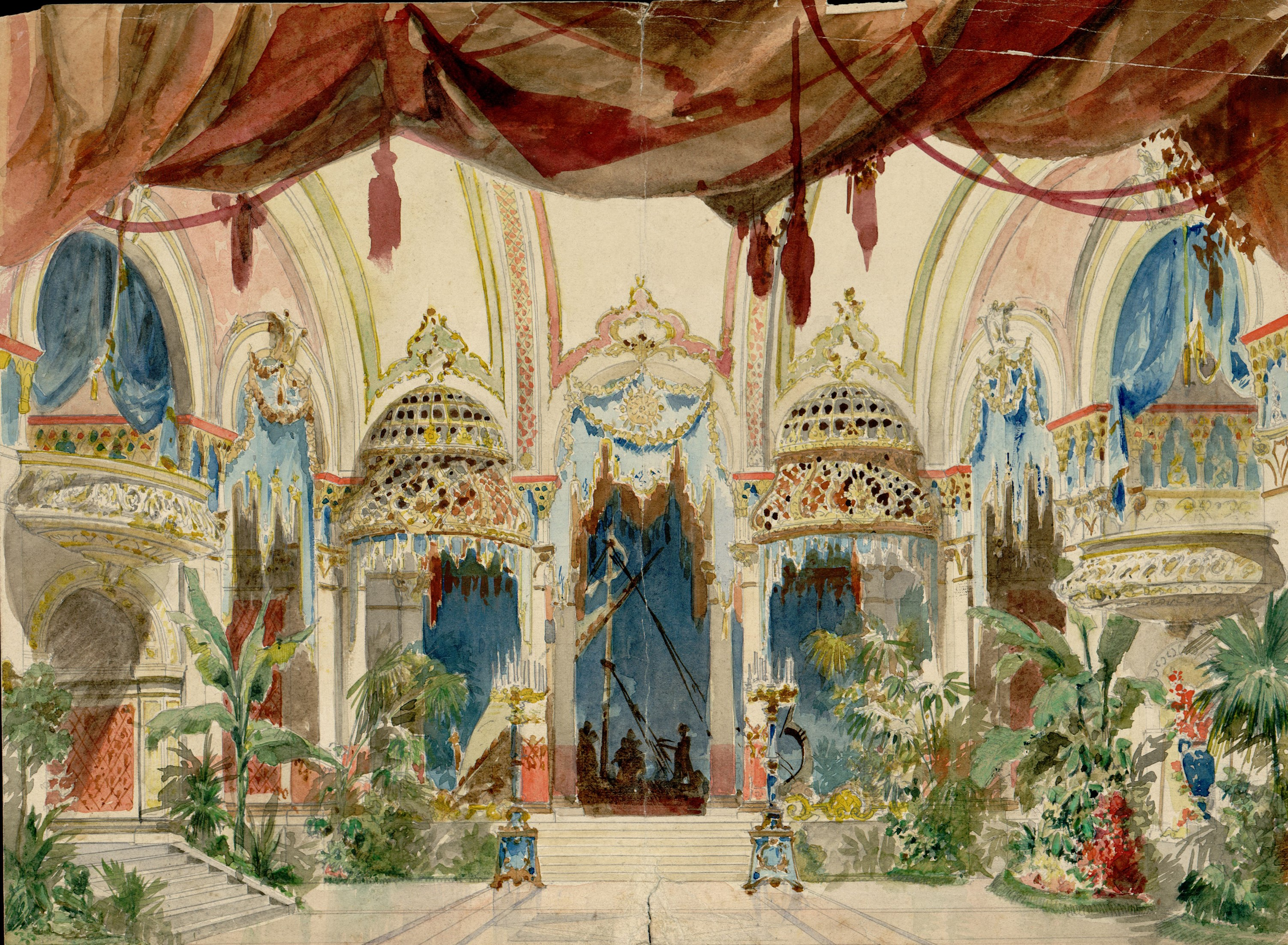
"The Winter Garden at the Casino Nuovo"; set design for Act III of Rosso e Nero (Red and Black), a ballet by Josef Bayer

Anton Brioschi (30 November 1855 – 31 August 1920) was an Austrian painter, scenic designer and graphic artist. His non-theatrical works were mostly landscapes and marine art.

== Life and work ==
Brioschi was born on 30 November 1855 in Vienna. His father, Carlo Brioschi, was also a painter and set designer. His older brother, Othmar Brioschi, also became an artist; specializing in landscapes. He studied at the Kunstgewerbeschule in Vienna with Josef Ritter von Storck, Michael Rieser and Valentin Teirich. In 1882, he was briefly employed by the city theater in Teplitz, followed by six months in Munich, working with the stage designer, Simon Quaglio. In 1883, he was hired as a theatre painter at the Staatsoper Hannover, and received good critical reviews in the local media.

After 1884, he worked at his father's studios and at the Vienna State Opera. In 1886, he succeeded him as Director of the Opera's art studios; a position he held until his death. His first project in that position involved creating new curtains (destroyed during World War II).

Until the late 1890s, He personally designed the sets for the Opera's most important productions, including Otello (1888), Cavalleria Rusticana (1891), Pagliacci (1893), and The Bartered Bride (1896). His sets were critically praised for their educational value, and audiences loved the bright colors.

In 1897, Gustav Mahler was appointed as Conductor and General Director. Three years later, Heinrich Lefler became his assistant, in charge of the furnishing and props department. Taken together, these additions had a tendency to restrict his independence and, increasingly, he found himself simply creating other people's designs. The final blow came in 1903, when the set decorating was assigned to Alfred Roller. After that, Brioschi was little more than a supervisor for the stage workers.

This brought an end to a period when the Brioschi family set the styles and standards for Central European theatre. Brioschi died on 31 August 1920 in Vienna. Many of his independent watercolors and oil paintings are in public museums and privately owned.

== Sources ==
- "Brioschi Anton". In: Österreichisches Biographisches Lexikon 1815–1950 (ÖBL). Vol. 1, Austrian Academy of Sciences, Vienna 1957, p. 114.
- Heinrich Fuchs: Die österreichischen Maler des 19. Jahrhunderts. Vol.1, K 46, Vienna 1972.
- Heinrich Fuchs: Die österreichischen Maler des 19. Jahrhunderts. Supplementary volume, K 70, Vienna 1978.
