= Burghart =

Burghart is a surname. Notable people with the surname include:

- Alex Burghart (born 1977), British politician
- Hermann Burghart (1834–1901), Bohemian-born Austrian scenic designer and set decorator
- Ralph Burghart (born 1966), Austrian figure skater and coach
