= Othmar Brioschi =

Austrian painter (1854–1912)

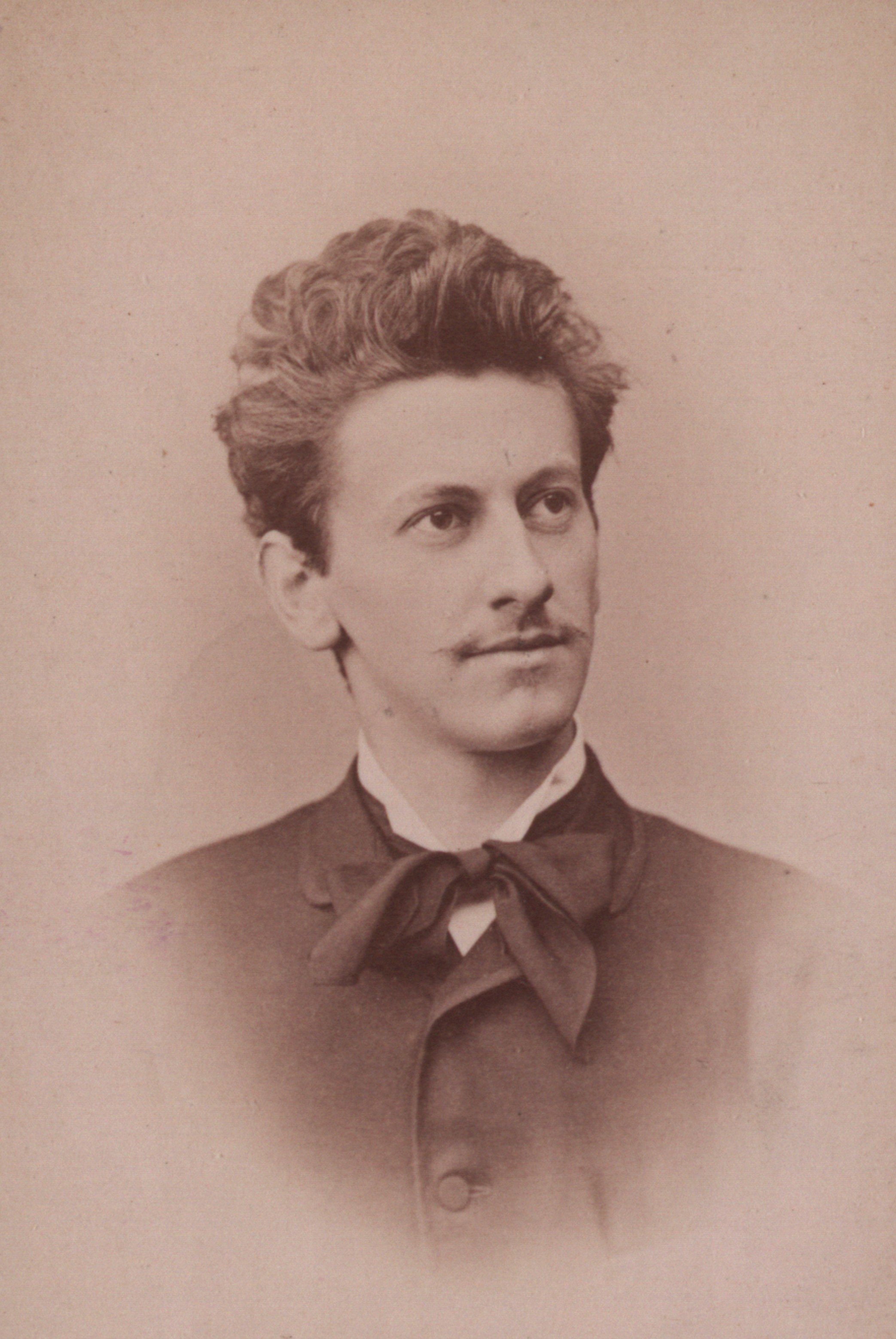
Photograph of Brioschi by Fritz Luckhardt, 1889

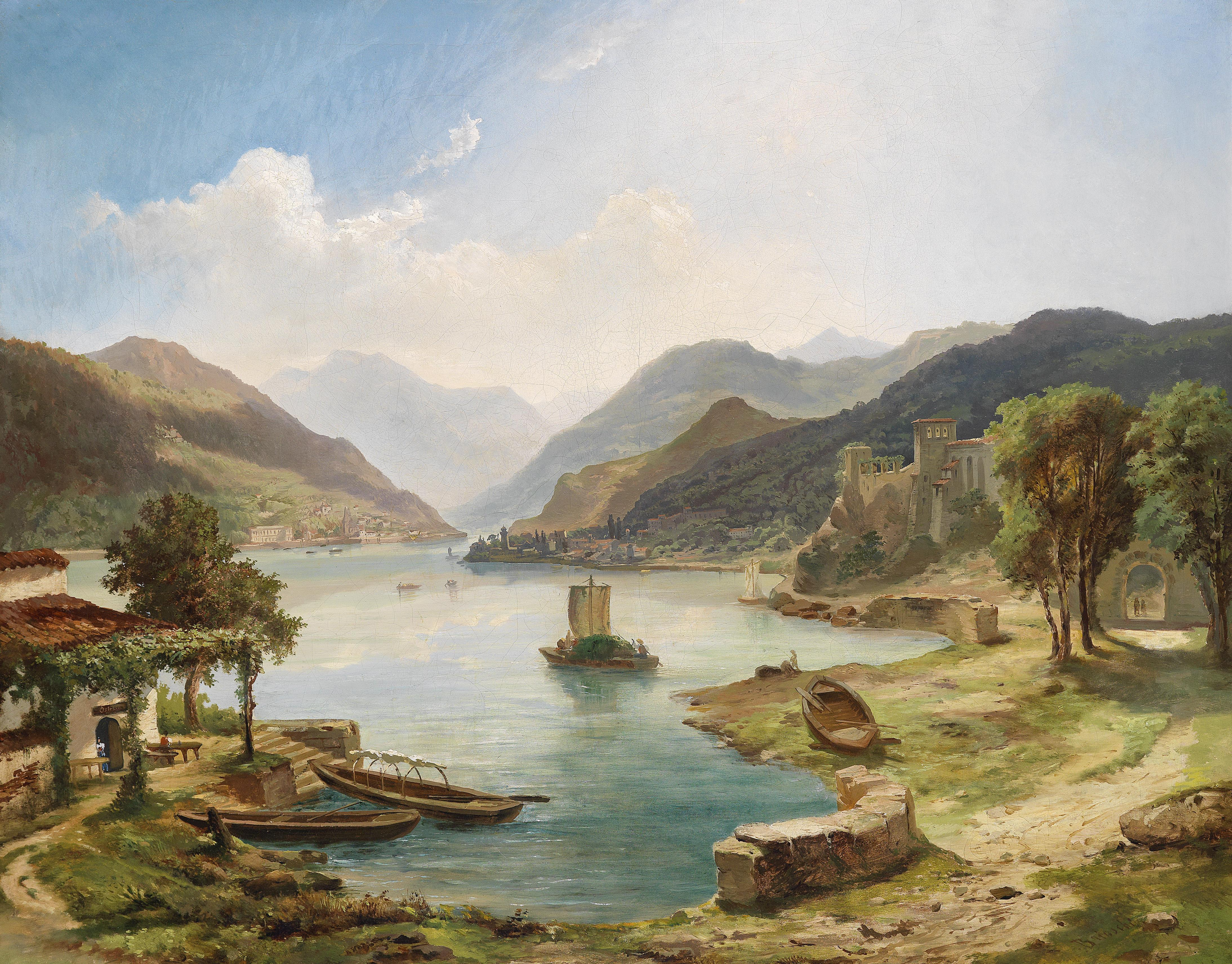
North Italian Lake Landscape

Othmar Brioschi (17 September 1854, Vienna - 8 July 1912, Rome) was a landscape painter from Austria-Hungary.

== Life and work ==
His father, Carlo Brioschi, and younger brother, Anton, were both theatre painters. He originally trained as one himself, in Munich with Simon Quaglio. But, from 1874, he also studied at the Academy of Fine Arts with Ludwig von Löfftz, and began figure painting in 1876. From 1878 to 1880, he worked as his father's assistant in Vienna and exhibited with the Vienna Künstlerhaus. In 1879, he became a member.

As a result, he was able to attend master classes in landscape painting with Eduard von Lichtenfels. In 1882, he won a major award that came with a scholarship; enabling him to study in Rome for two years. He decided to live there permanently. In 1887, he married Maria Imhof, daughter of the sculptor Heinrich Max Imhof, and they had three children.

In 1905, he was named a Professor by the Accademia di San Luca.

== Sources ==
- "Brioschi Othmar". In: Österreichisches Biographisches Lexikon 1815–1950 (ÖBL). Vol. 1, Austrian Academy of Sciences, Vienna 1957, p. 115.
- Heinrich Fuchs: Die österreichischen Maler des 19. Jahrhunderts, Vol., pp.46/47, 1972
