= Anton Jaich =

Czech painter

Anton Jaich (also Peter Anton Jaich, Jaisch, or Taich) (1804, Vienna – 1875, Brno) was a painter specialising in theatrical painting and set design.

Jaich's career took him first to Graz (1836–1838), then a short period in Linz (1839), before moving on to Olomouc (1840) and then back to Graz (1842–1845). There he had stable employment working for the Estates Theatre in Prague from 1846 to 1861 where he was also in charge of lighting. He returned to Linz in 1868 where he stayed until 1872. He moved to Brno in 1873 where he was also the theatrical engineer.

== Family ==
He had five children: Floriana Jaichová, Wilhelmina Kautská (Jaichová), Louisa Jaichová, Viktor Jaich, and Anton Jaich. Wilhelmina, known as Minna, married Johann Kautsky and was the mother of Karl Kautsky.
