= Franz Poledne =

Austrian painter and illustrator (1873–1932)

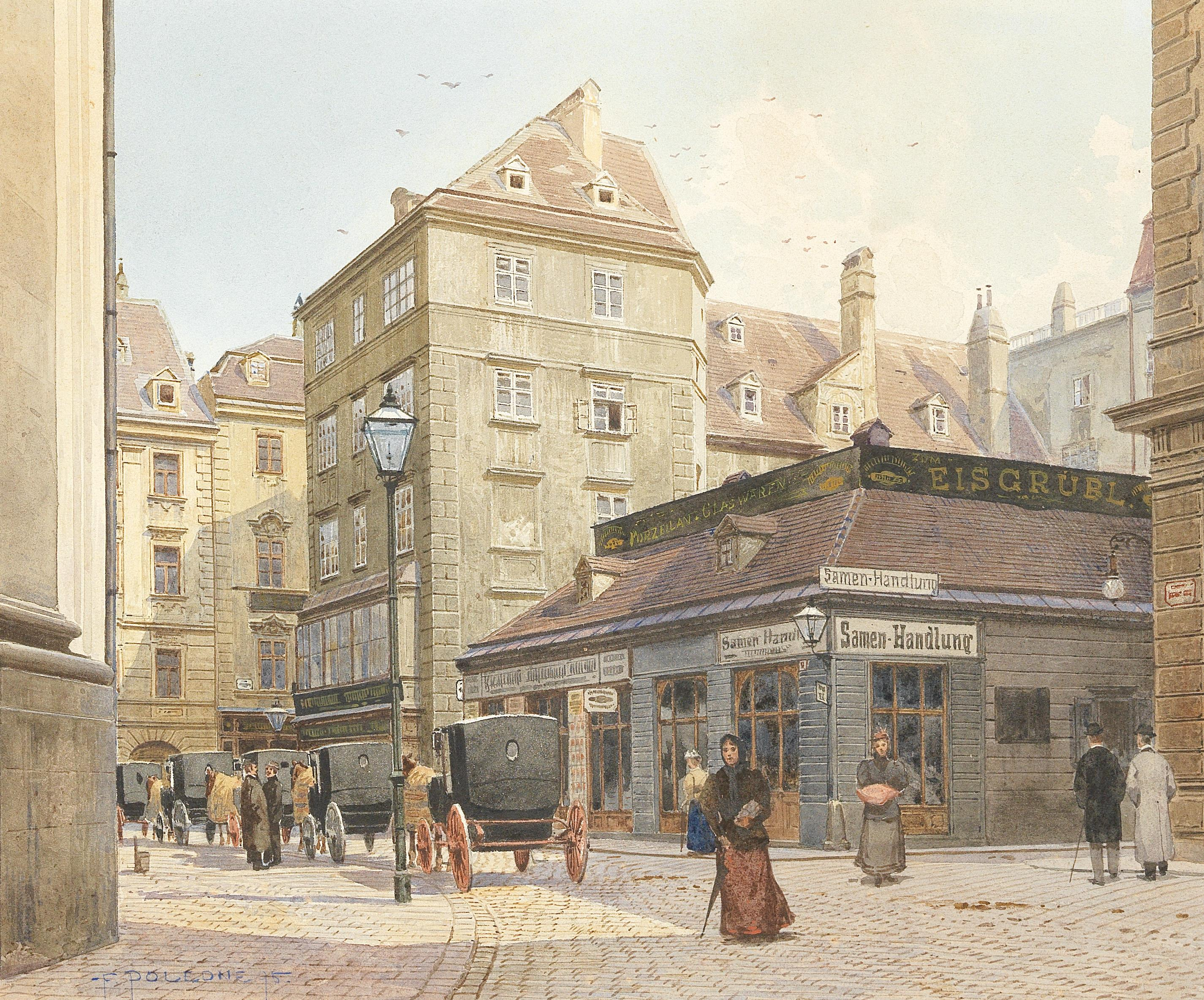
The Eisgrübl buildings, on the Petersplatz

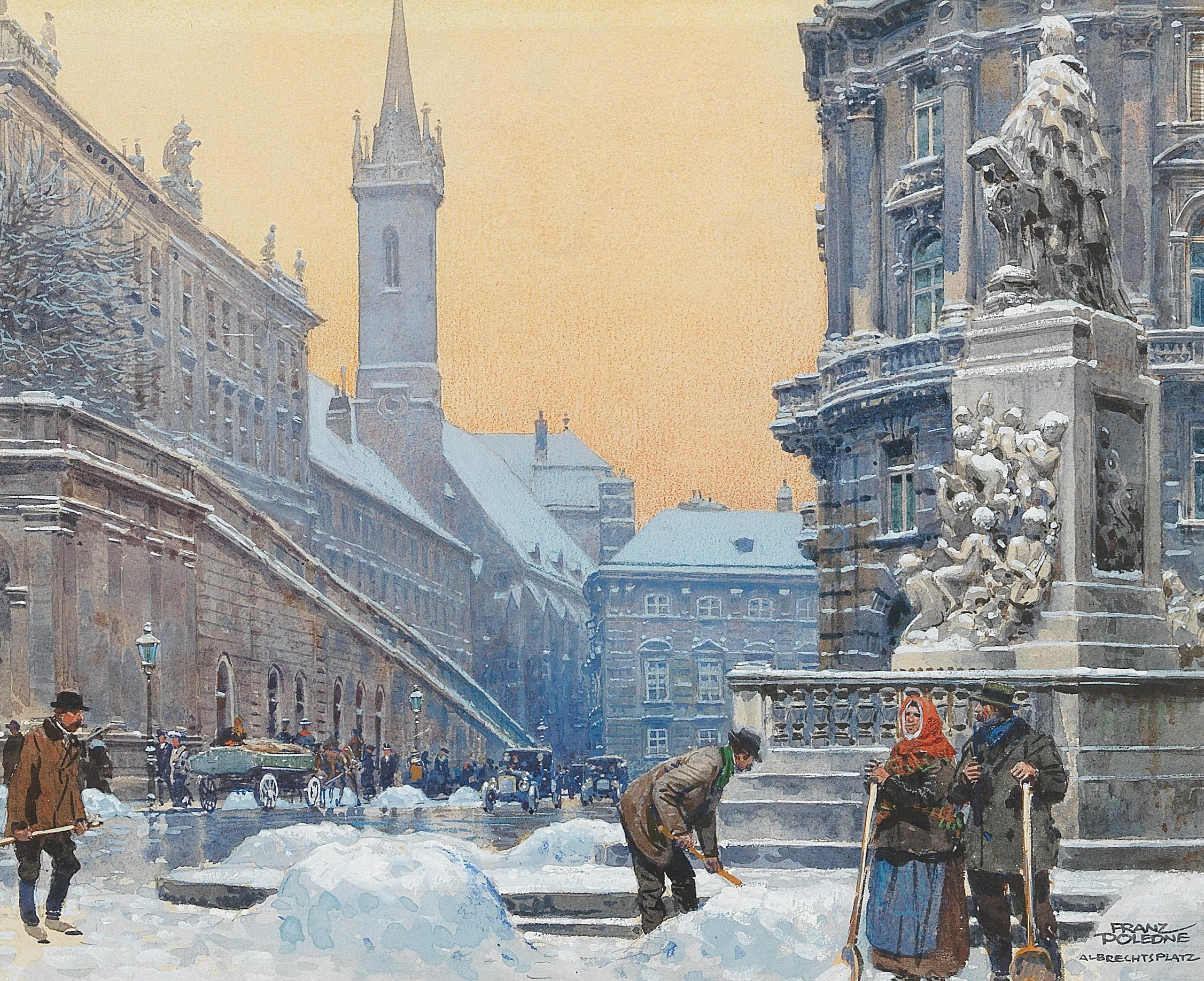
The Albertina and the Augustinian Church

Franz Poledne (10 April 1873, Vienna – 7 January 1932, Klosterneuburg) was an Austrian painter and illustrator; best known for his vedute of Vienna.

== Life and work ==
In 1888, while still a teenager, he began working in the studios of the set decorator, Hermann Burghart. He worked there until 1893. During that time, he attended the drawing school at the Höhere Graphische Bundes-Lehr- und Versuchsanstalt (Higher Federal Graphical Training and Research Institute). After that, he became an illustrator for magazines such as Über Land und Meer and the Illustrirte Welt. From 1907 until his death, he worked for the Illustrierte Kronen Zeitung.

As a painter, he produced oils and watercolors. His vedute documented the changes taking place in early 20th century Vienna, and he was one of a group of painters, including Rudolf von Alt, Emil Hütter, Franz Kopallik, Richard Moser and Erwin Pendl who created the familiar, sentimental image of "Old Vienna"

He took part in World War I as a Master Corporal in the Landsturm, a reserve unit composed of older men. At the end of the war, he was awarded the Zivil-Verdienstkreuz (Civil Merit Cross) on the Medal for Bravery. He was also one of the numerous painters who were employed by the Royal War Press Quarters

He died following a serious illness. He had been treated by his friend, Dr. Emil Gelny, who later became involved in the Nazi eugenics program.
