= Ferdinand Brunner =

Austrian painter (1870–1945)

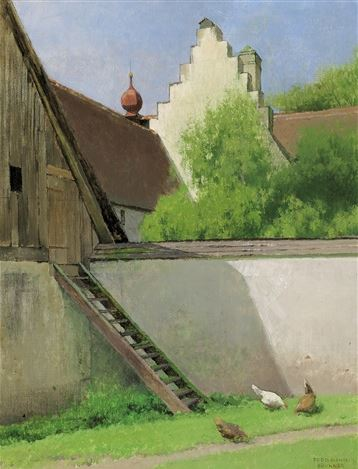
The Parish Garden in Aflenz

Ferdinand Brunner (1 May 1870 – 30 November 1945) was an Austrian landscape painter.

== Life and work ==
Brunner was born on 1 May 1870 in Vienna. At the age of fourteen, he was apprenticed to the court theatre painters, Carlo Brioschi, Hermann Burghart and Johann Kautsky. After 1891, he studied at the Academy of Fine Arts, Vienna, in the master class of Eduard von Lichtenfels. He was awarded the Academy's Gundel-Prize for excellence in 1894 and became a member of the Vienna Künstlerhaus in 1901.

His major exhibitions include the International Art and Horticulture Exhibition (1904) and the German National Art Exhibition (1907), both in Düsseldorf, as well as several showings at the Glaspalast in Munich. In 1910, he received the Großen Goldenen Staatsmedaille. He died on 30 November 1945 in Vienna.

Rural scenes in Lower Austria, Bohemia and Hungary were his favorite motifs. His works may be seen at the Vienna Museum, the Lower Austria Museum, and in the gallery at the Vienna Academy.

== Sources ==
- "Brunner, Ferdinand". In: Allgemeines Künstlerlexikon. Die Bildenden Künstler aller Zeiten und Völker (AKL). Vol. 14, Saur, 1996, ISBN 3-598-22754-X, p. 564
- Heinrich Fuchs: Ferdinand Brunner. Malerischer Entdecker des Waldviertels, Vienna 1979
- Heinrich Fuchs: Die österreichischen Maler des 19. Jahrhunderts, Band 1 (A–F), Vienna 1972
- Rupert Feuchtmüller: Ferdinand Brunner. Katalog anlässlich der Gedächtnisausstellung zur 100. Wiederkehr seines Geburtstages im Niederösterreichischen Landesmuseum, Vienna 1970
