= Giuseppe Brioschi =

Italian painter

Giuseppe Brioschi (1801 – November 24, 1858) was a painter and scenic designer in the Austrian Empire.

== Biography ==
He was born in Trezzano sul Naviglio. He was the brother of the scenic designer Carlo Brioschi, the elder, who had studied in Venice; Giuseppe studied with Alessandro Sanquirico, scenic designer of the Teatro alla Scala, and at the Brera Academy in Milan. In 1835, he helped design the celebration apparatus (the equivalent of modern festival floats) to celebrate the coronation of the Habsburg emperor Ferdinand. In 1838 he moved to Vienna with Antonio Pioni to become a scene painter for the Hofoper. He established a studio for the Court Opera at the Kärntnertortheater. He died in Vienna in 1858.

Giuseppe Brioschi was the father of Carlo Brioschi, also a scenic designer.
