= Carlo Brioschi =

Italian-Austrian painter

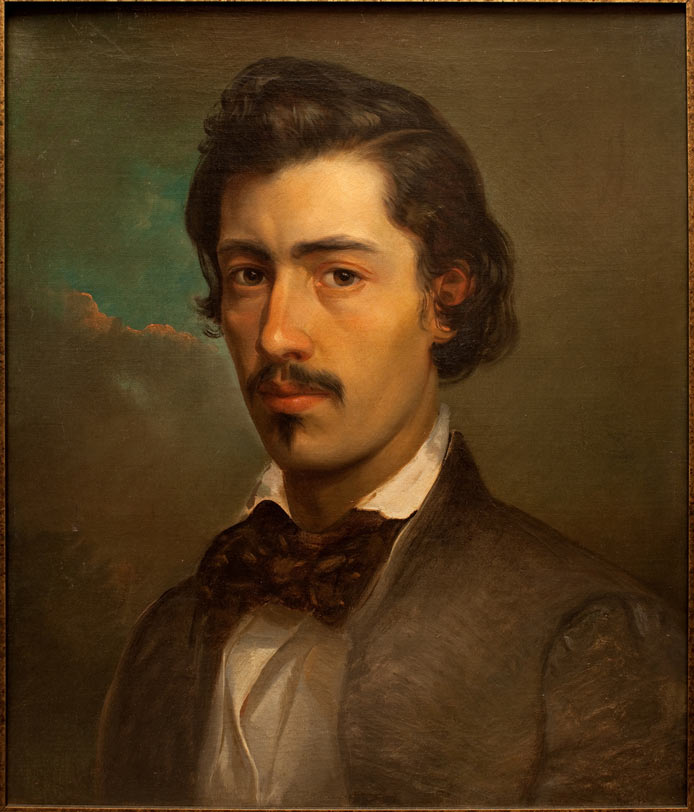
Self Portrait (c. 1850)

Carlo Brioschi (24 June 1826 – 12 November 1895) was an Italian-Austrian painter and scenic designer.

== Life ==
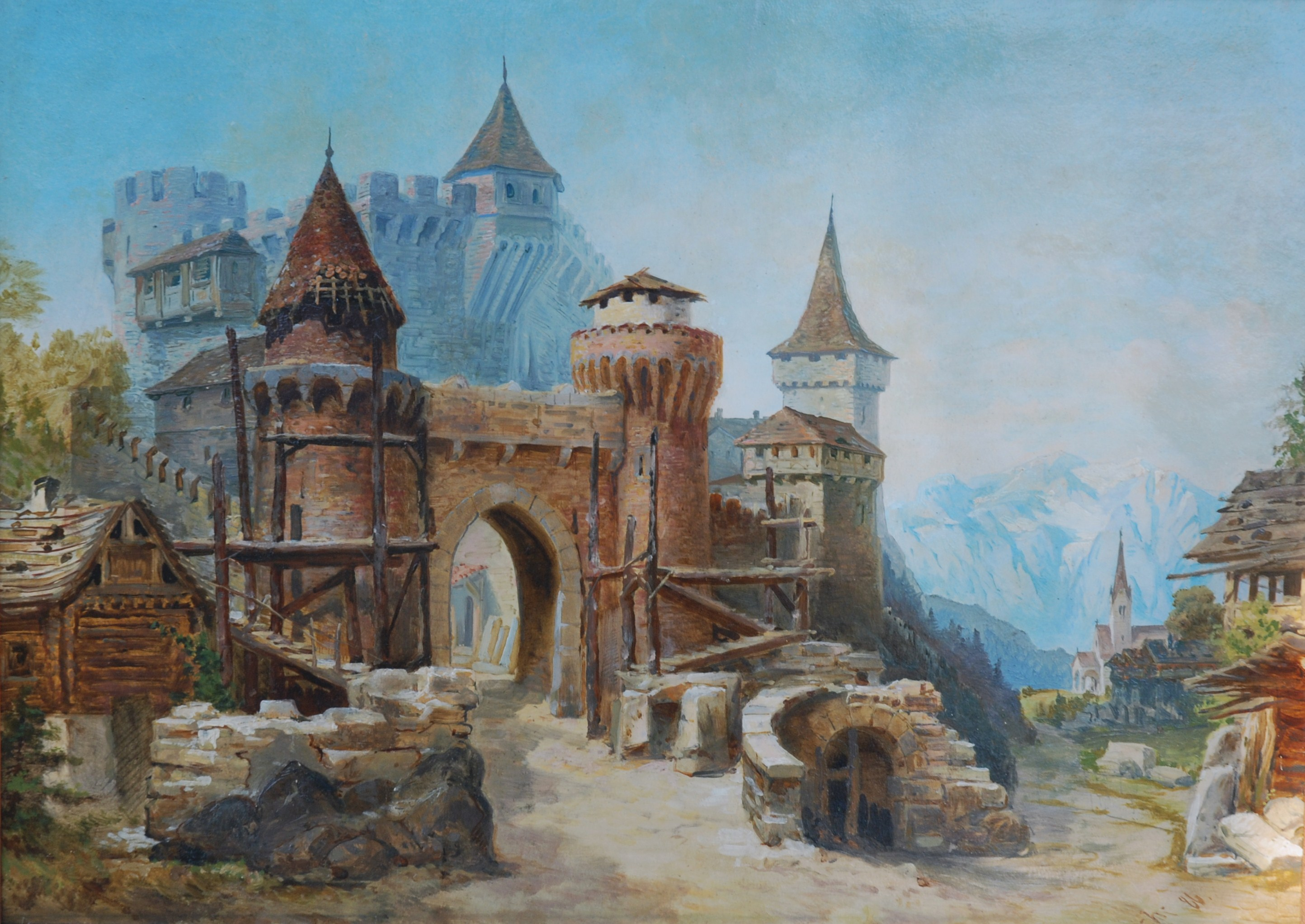
Old Fortress in Alpine Landscape

Brioschi was born on 24 June 1826 in Milan, then part of the Austrian Empire. He was the son of the scenic designer Giuseppe Brioschi (died in Vienna in 1856) and father of the similarly engaged Othmar (1854–1912) and Anton (1855–1920). He was a student of Leopold Kupelwieser, Thomas Ender, and Franz Steinfeld at the Academy of Fine Arts, Vienna. In 1853, he worked in Paris. From 1856 to 1886, he worked with the Vienna State Opera.

With Johann Kautsky and Hermann Burghart he established the cooperative enterprise of "Brioschi, Burghart und Kautsky, k.u.k. Hoftheatermaler in Wien", which employed dozens of carpenters, blacksmiths, mechanics and clerks in addition to their painters; among whom were Georg Janny, Leopold Rothaug, Ferdinand Brunner and Alphonse Mucha. The studio received many orders from abroad as well as locally. Among their regular customers was the Metropolitan Opera in New York.

Brioschi died in Vienna on 12 November 1895.
