= Georg Janny =

Austrian painter

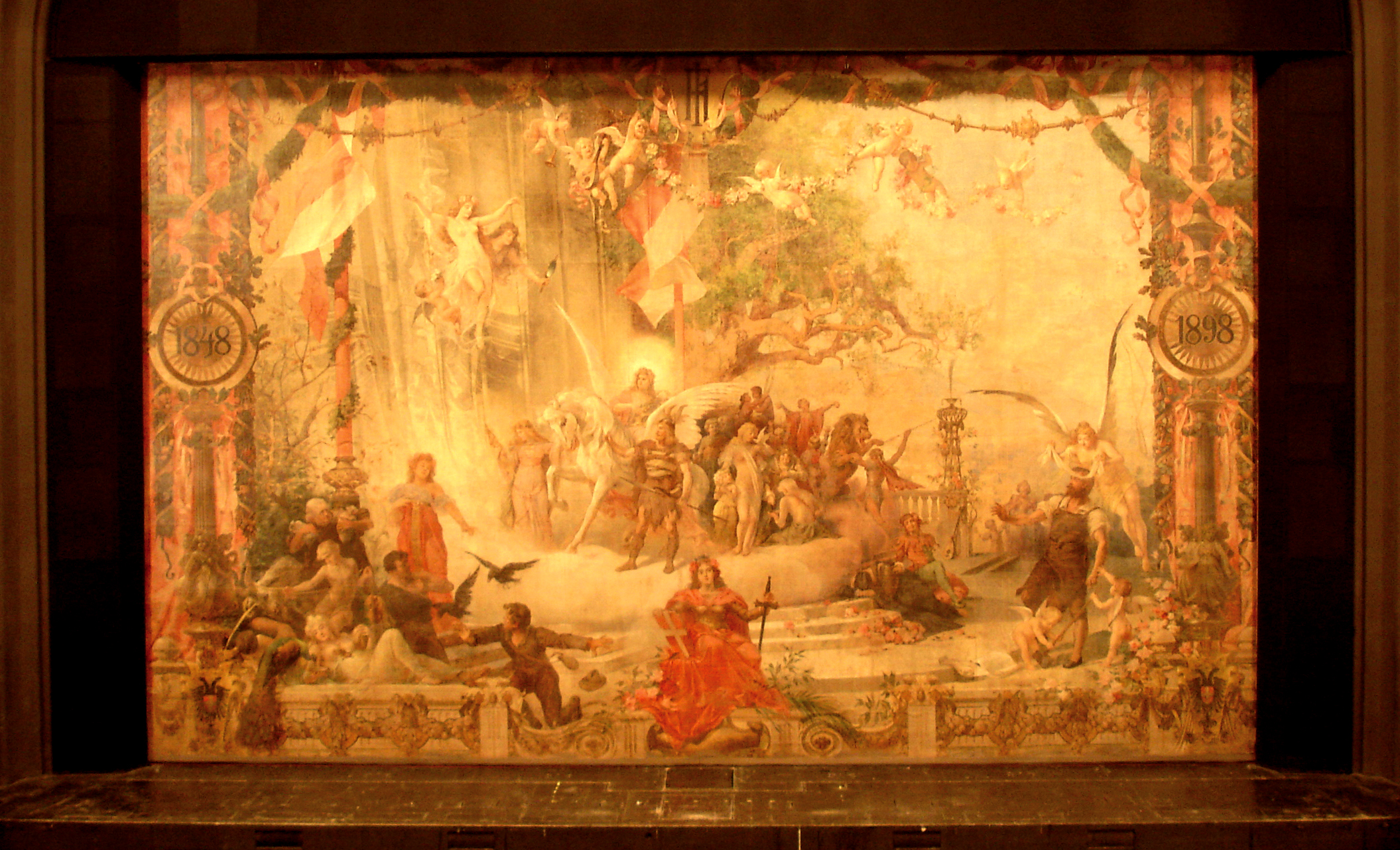
The "Iron Curtain" at the Vienna Volksoper

Georg Janny (20 May 1864, Vienna - 21 February 1935, Vienna) was an Austrian landscape painter and set designer.

== Life ==
He worked as a scene painter in the studios of Carlo Brioschi and Johann Kautsky, alongside Alfons Mucha, and was a member of the Dürerbund.

In 1898, he participated in painting the "Eisernen Vorhang" (Iron Curtain) at the Vienna Volksoper for the 50th jubilee of Emperor Franz Joseph I. In 1904, he exhibited in the Austrian Pavilion at the St.Louis World's Fair with scenes from the Imperial Royal Austrian State Railways (now at the Technisches Museum Wien). Two years later, he designed the stage for The Queen of Sheba by Karl Goldmark, one of the most popular operas of the late 19th century. Pictures from the second and third acts have been preserved.

He also painted landscapes and figures, including scenes from fairy-tales or imaginary worlds that are reminiscent of the works of Arnold Böcklin or Gustave Doré.

The contents of his estate are now in the possession of the Bezirksmuseum Hernals (Hernals District Museum) in Vienna

== Selected paintings ==
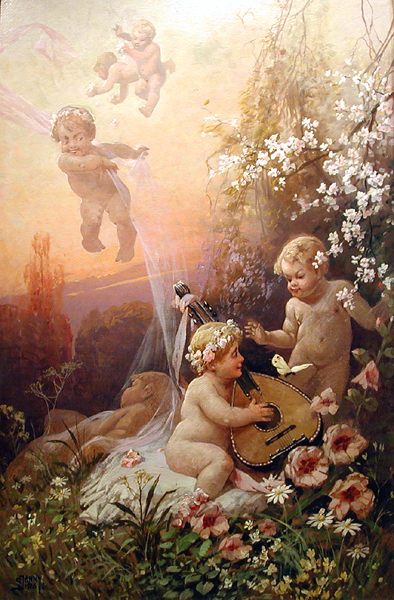
Angels (1906)

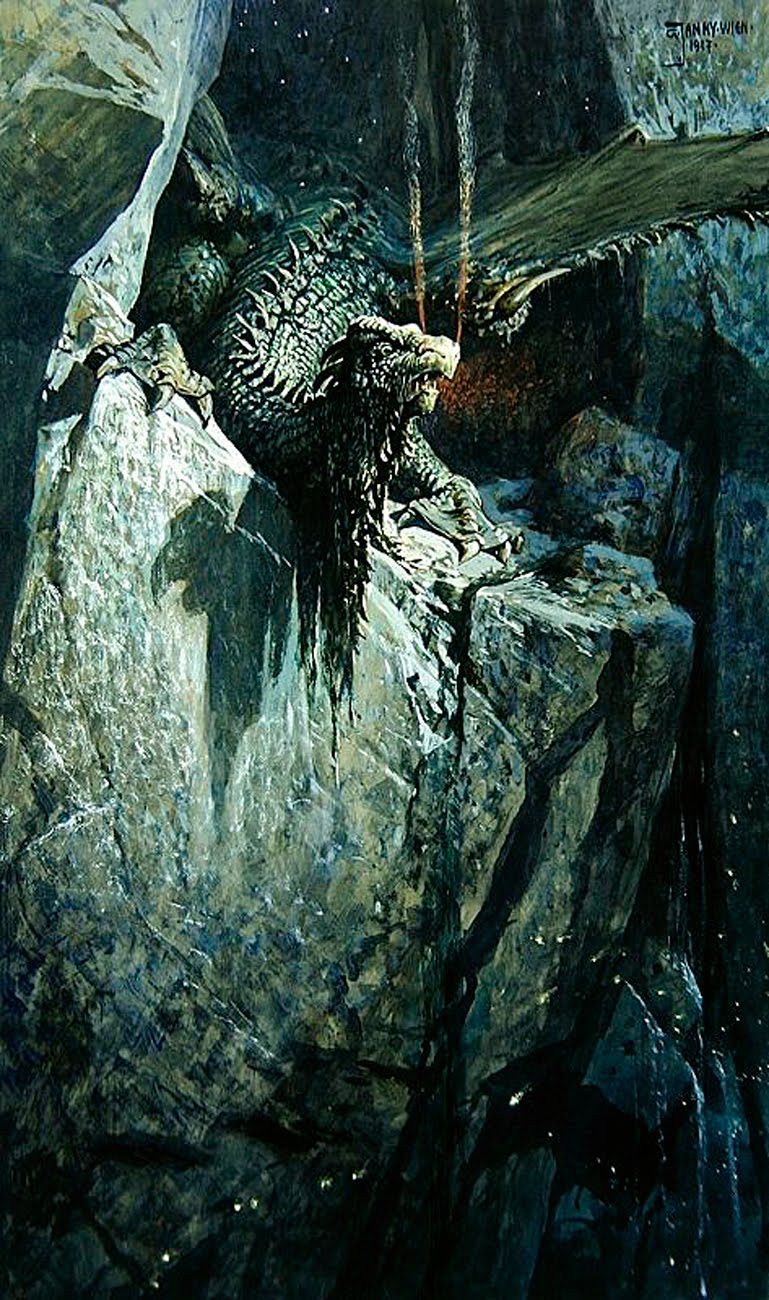
The Dragon's cave (1917)

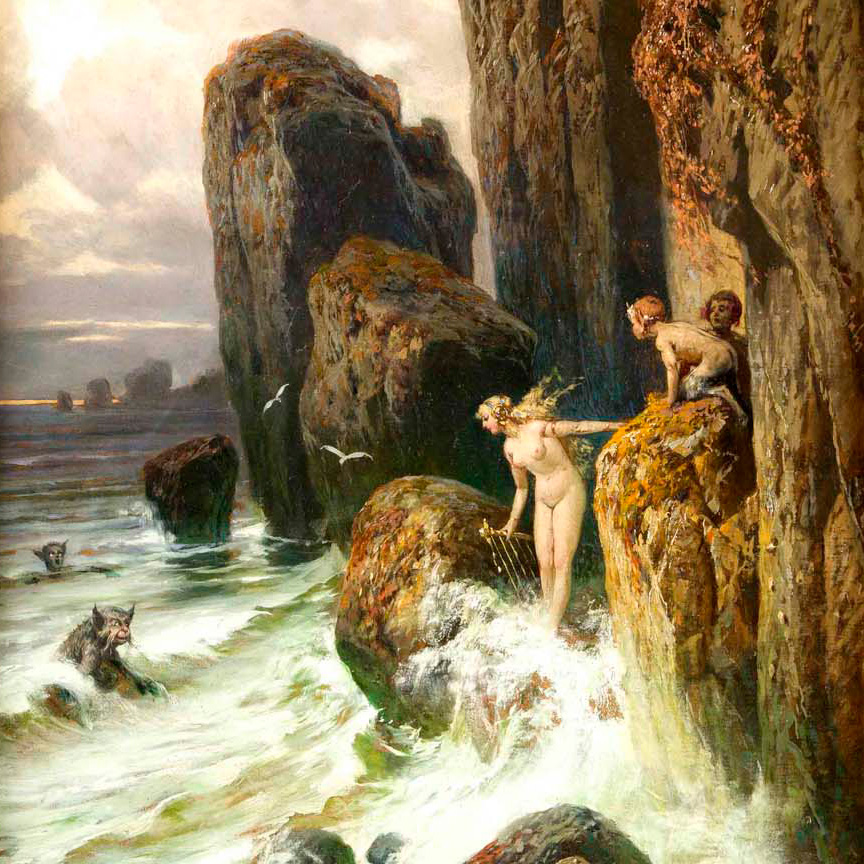
Sea Idyll

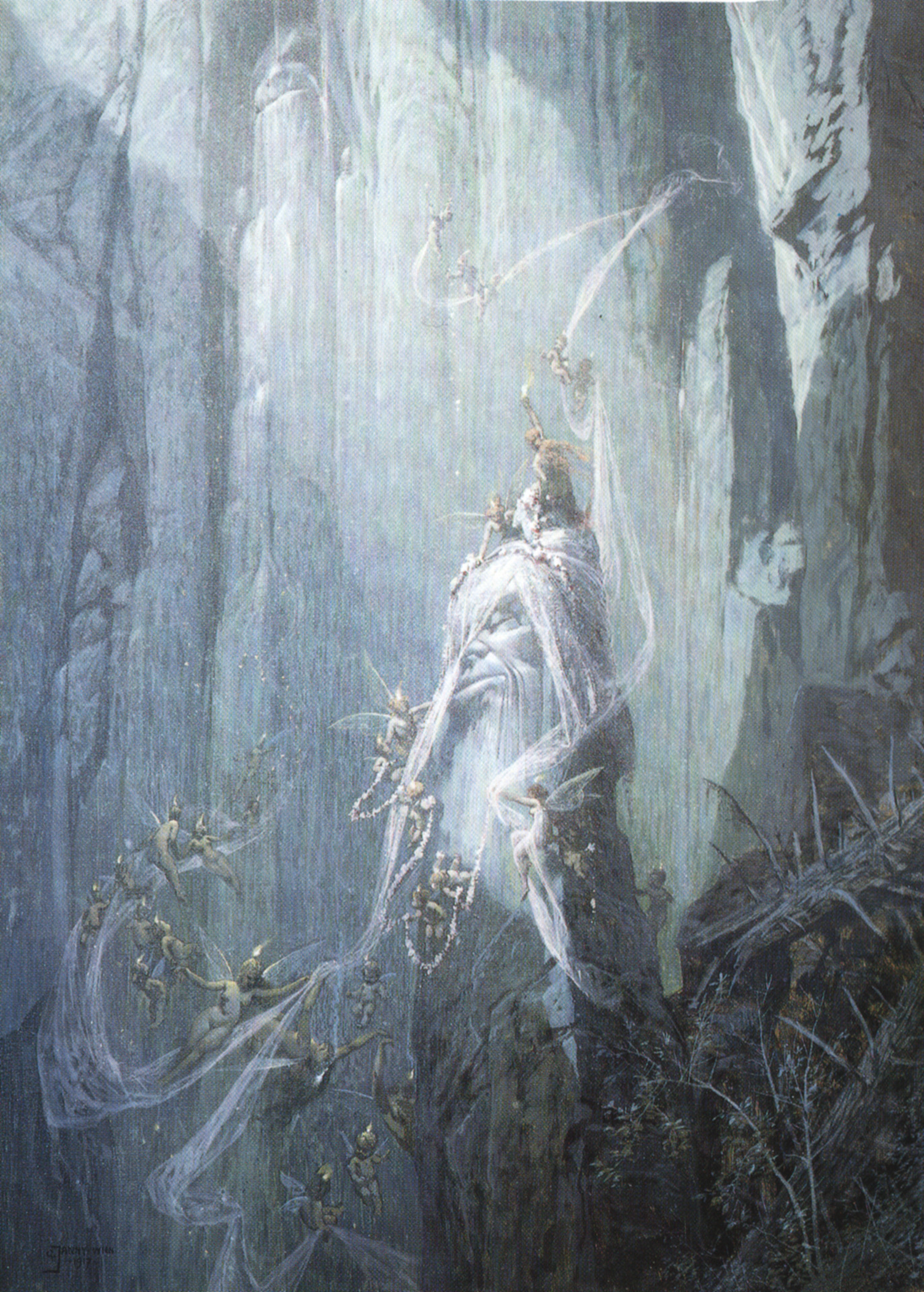
Elf Games (1917)

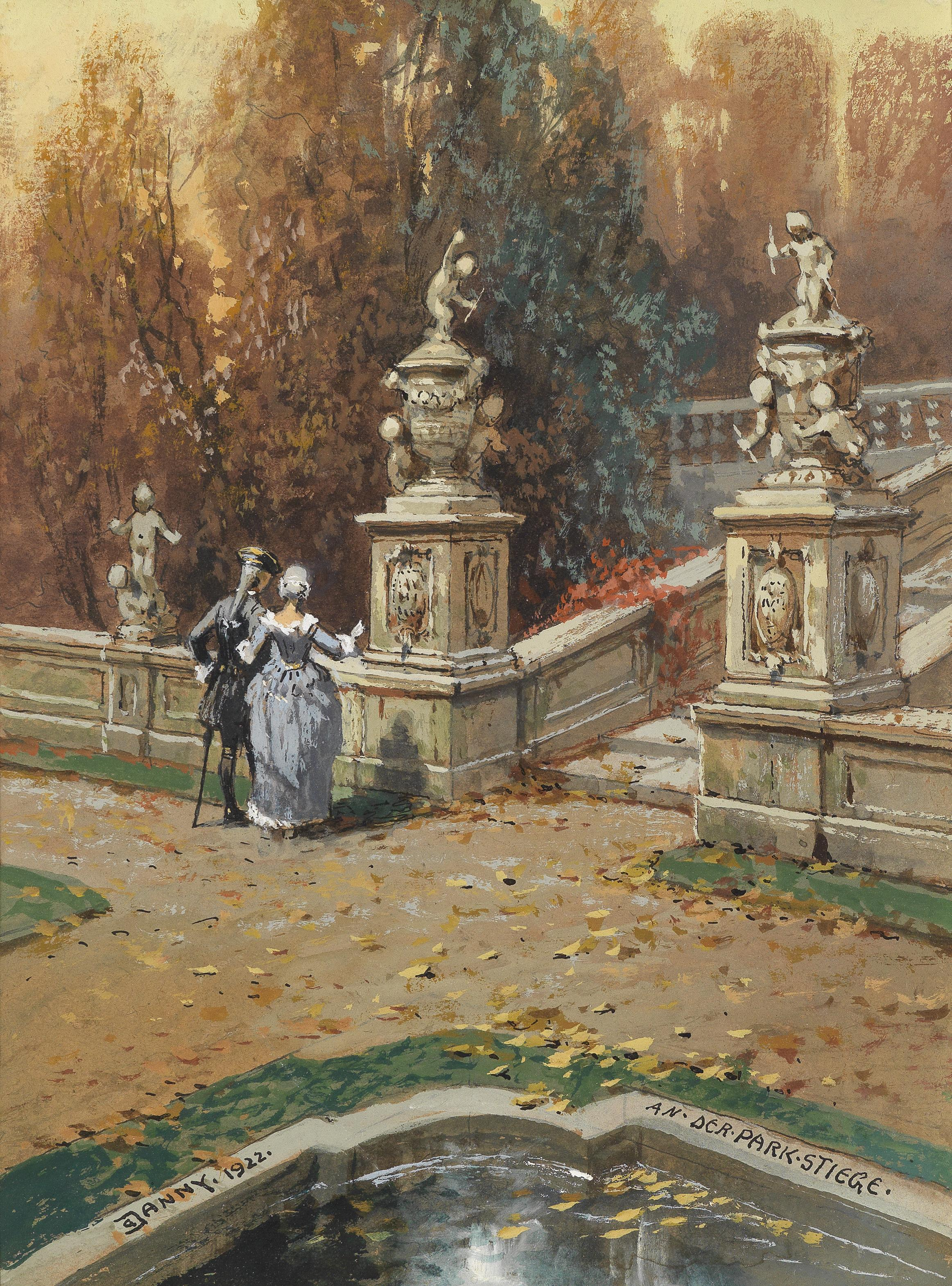
On the Park Stairs (1922)
