= Hermann Burghart =

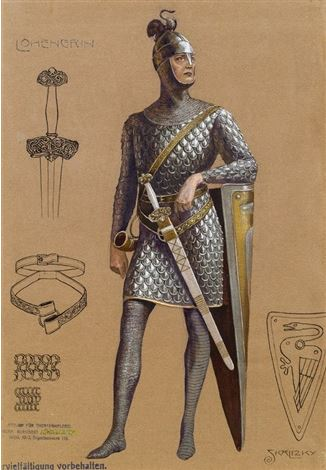
Costume design for Lohengrin

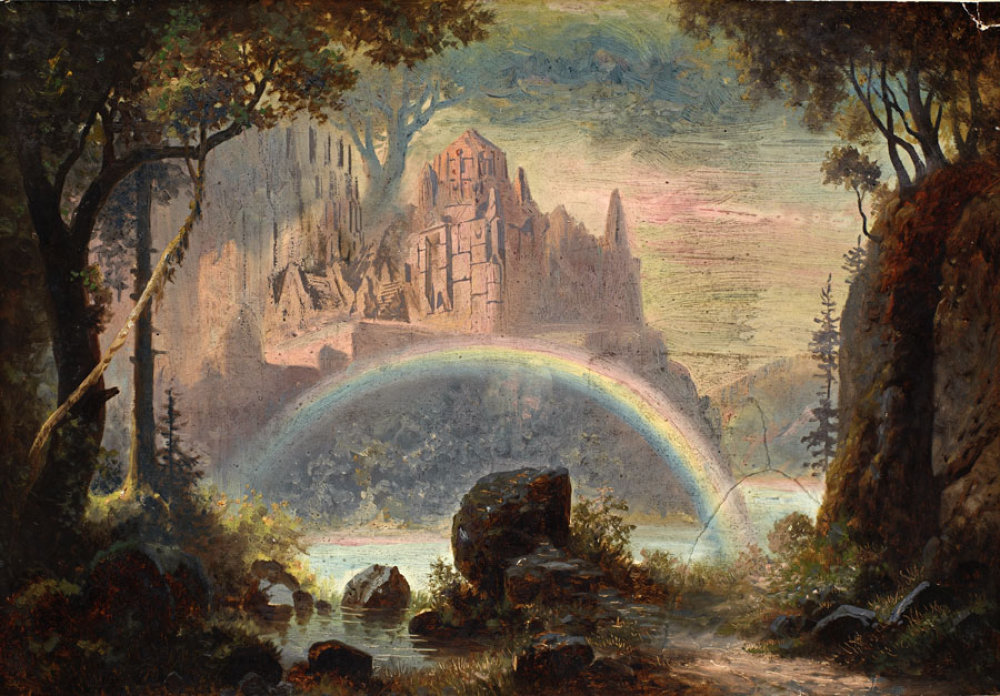
"Valhalla"; set design for Das Rheingold

Hermann Burghart (7 April 1834 – 23 January 1901) was a Czech-Austrian scenic designer and set decorator.

== Life and work ==
Burghart was born on 7 April 1834 in Trmice in Bohemia, Austrian Empire. He studied at the Academy of Fine Arts, Vienna. In 1866, he was engaged as a set designer and decorative painter at the Vienna State Opera.

Later that same year, he was taken on as a partner at the theater decorating studio belonging to Carlo Brioschi and Johann Kautsky. The studio was subsequently named "Brioschi, Burghart und Kautsky, k.u.k. Hoftheatermaler in Wien". It employed dozens of carpenters and mechanics in addition to its artists. These included, at various times, Georg Janny, Konrad Petrides, Franz Poledne, Leopold Rothaug, Ferdinand Brunner and Alphonse Mucha. They fulfilled orders throughout Germany and abroad. One of their regular customers was the Metropolitan Opera in New York. Notably, they provided sets for the Viennese premiere of Tristan und Isolde by Richard Wagner.

He also taught painting at his alma mater, the Vienna Academy. The illustrator and architectural painter, Erwin Pendl was one of his most prominent students.

Burghart died on 23 January 1901 in Vienna.
