= Michael Rieser =

Austrian painter (1828–1905)

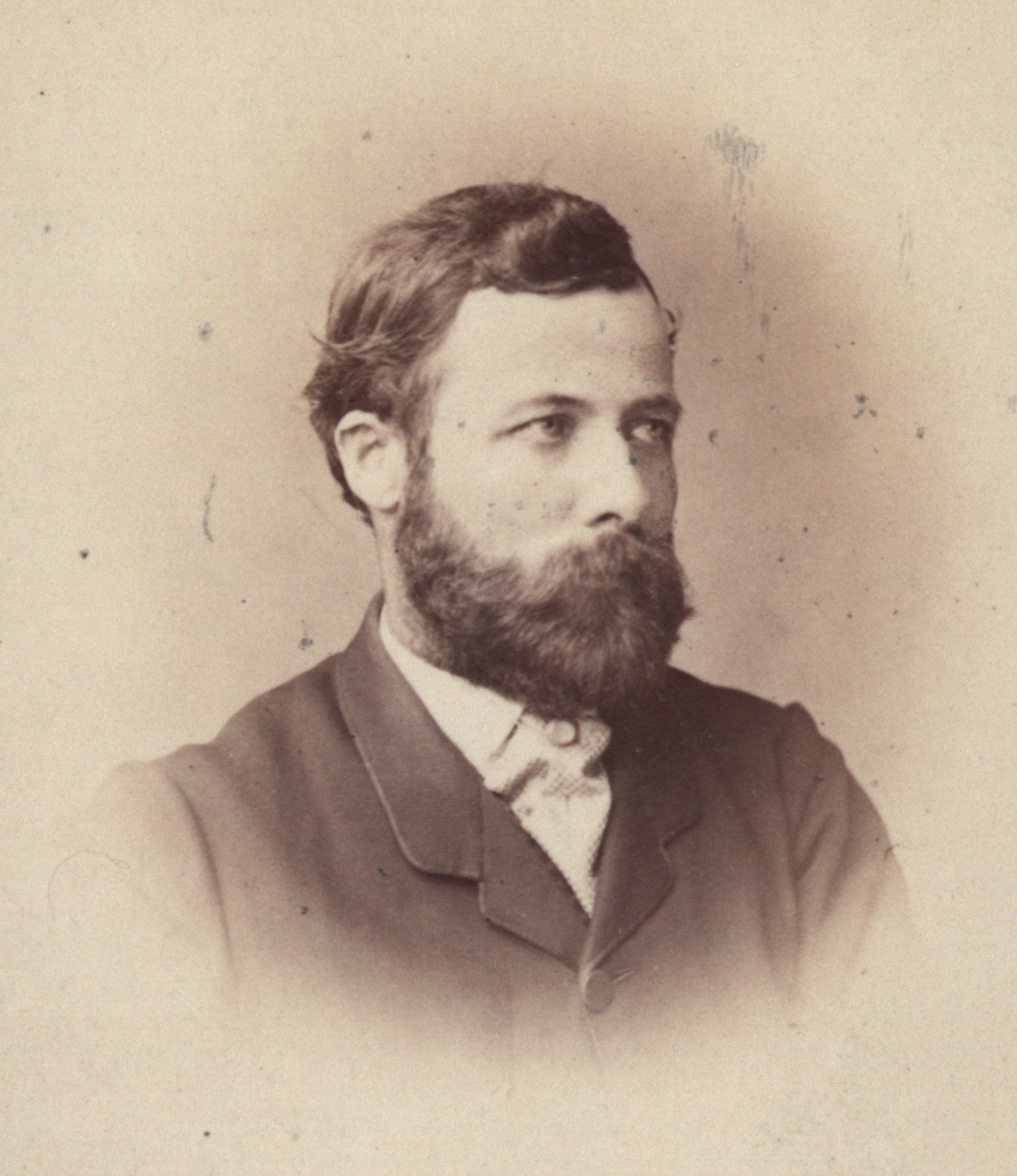
Photograph of Rieser, c. 1866 – 1870

Michael Rieser (5 September 1828, in Schlitters – 9 November 1905, in Vienna) was an Austrian painter. He studied at the Academy of Fine Arts, Munich from 1848 to 1850 under Christian Ruben. After a stay in Rome (1861-1864) he moved to Vienna, and taught at the Kunstgewerbeschule there from 1868 to 1888. His students included Gustav Klimt and Franz von Matsch.
