= Minna Kautsky =

Czech-Austrian actress and novelist (1837–1912)

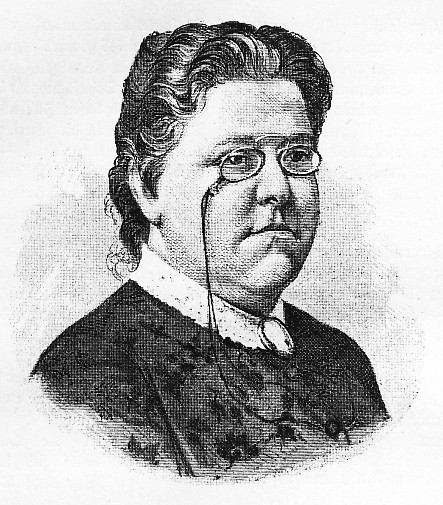
Minna Kautsky, engraving after a photograph by Ludwig Angerer (c. 1890)

Minna Kautsky, born Wilhelmine Jaich (11 June 1837 – 20 December 1912), was a Czech-Austrian actress and novelist who was strongly influenced by socialism and the women's movement. She often wrote under the pseudonyms "Eckert" and "Wilhelm Wiener".

== Biography ==
Kautsky was born on 11 June 1837 in Graz. Her father, Anton Jaich, was a scenic designer. After 1845, the family lived in Prague. She occasionally appeared as an actress at the Niklastheater in Vienna and the Schauspielhaus in Graz. In 1854, she married Johann Kautsky, a landscape painter and set designer. They had a daughter and three sons, including Karl Kautsky, who would become a famous Marxist theoretician. Over the following years, she acted in Olomouc, Sondershausen, Güstrow, and at the National Theatre in Prague. In 1861, she was forced to give up acting due to a lung disease. From 1863 to 1886, they lived in Vienna, where Johann was appointed a decorative painter at the Vienna State Opera.

In 1870, she wrote an article in a clerical newspaper under the pseudonym "Eckert". Five years later, her son Karl introduced her to socialist ideas, which inspired articles in the Neuen Welt and Die Neue Zeit, all signed as "Wilhelm Wiener". In 1885, she paid a brief visit to Friedrich Engels in London. That same year, she joined the Vienna Writers and Artists' Association and served as its president from 1886 to 1887. About this time, she and Johann built a home in Sankt Gilgen, which they named the "Villa Kotzian". Many figures in the socialist movement were visitors there, including Wilhelm Liebknecht, Victor Adler, Franz Mehring, and Rosa Luxemburg

From 1904, she divided her time between the villa and Karl's home in Berlin. She died in a hospital there on 20 December 1912, from pneumonia. Her remains were cremated.
