= Johann Kautsky =

Czech-Austrian scenic designer (1827–1896)

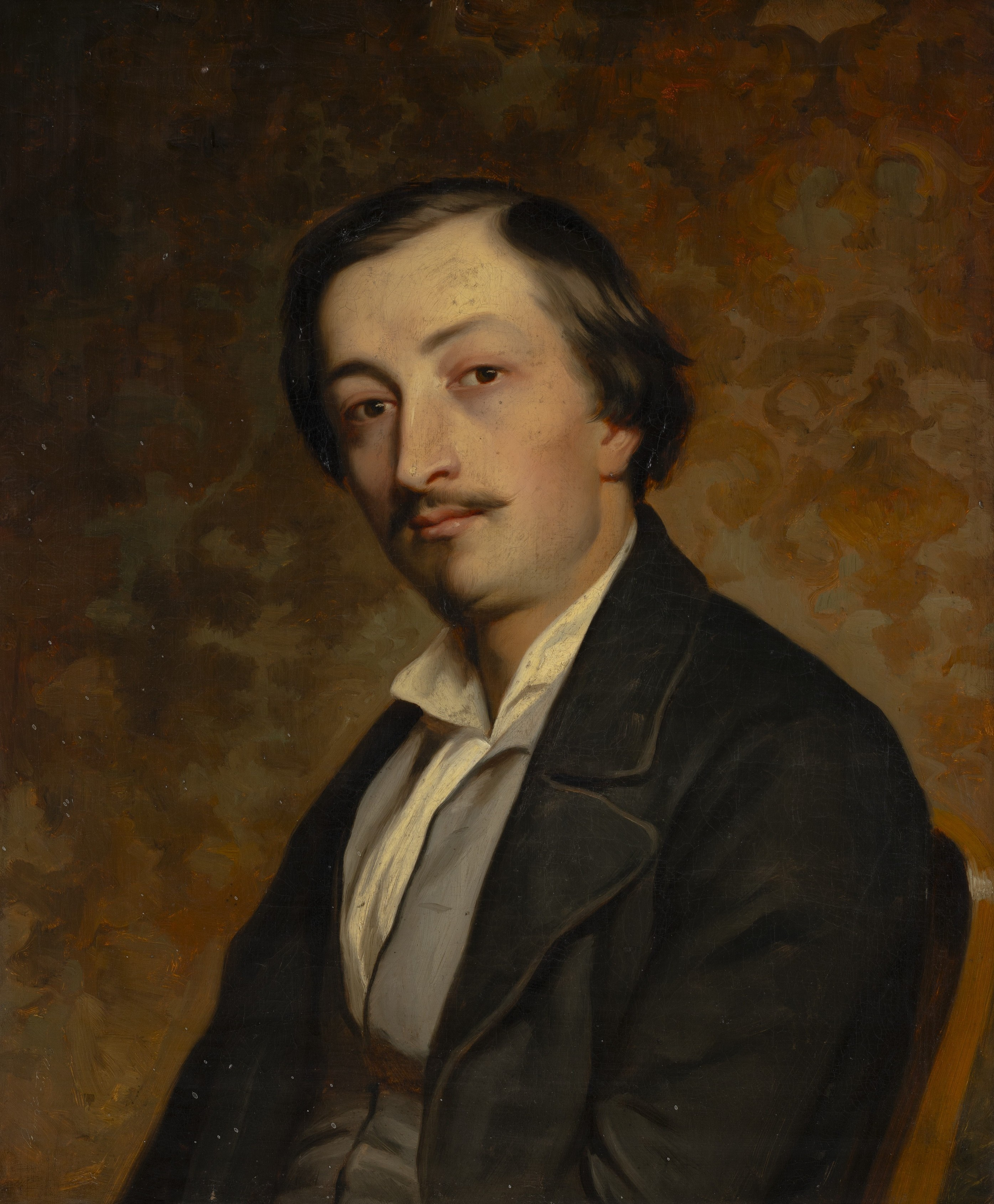
- Portrait by Jaroslav Čermák, c. 1850
- Born: Jan Václav Kautský; 14 September 1827; Prague, Bohemia, Austrian Empire
- Died: 4 September 1896 (aged 68); St. Gilgen, Austria-Hungary
- Spouse: Minna Kautsky
- Children: 4, including Karl Kautsky

Johann Baptist Wenzel Kautsky (or Jan Václav Kautský; 14 September 1827 – 4 September 1896) was a Czech-Austrian scenic designer and landscape painter. He was co-owner of "Brioschi, Burghart und Kautsky", a stage decorating company in Vienna.

== Life ==
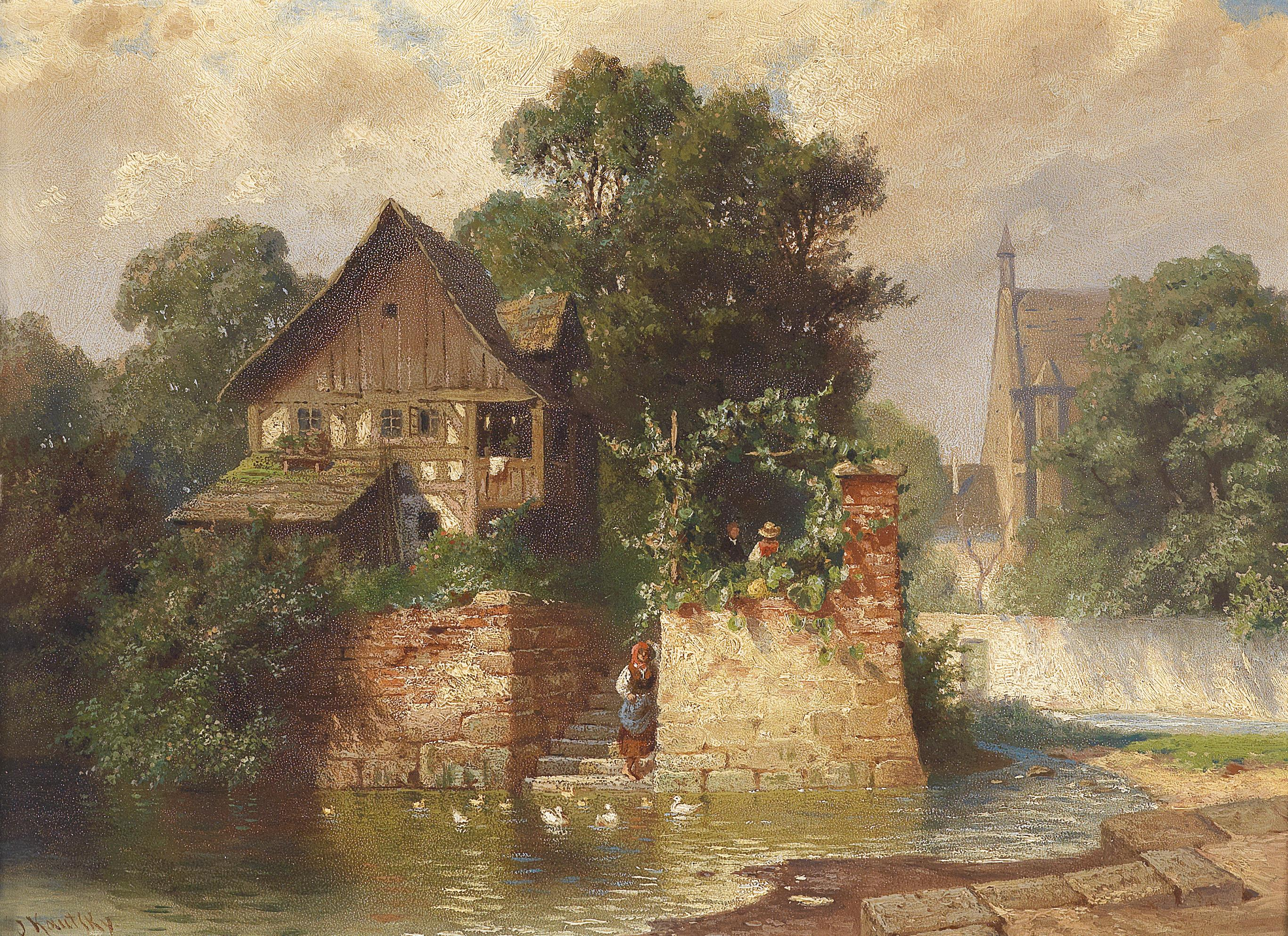
Idyll by the City Moat (1864)

Kautsky was born on 14 September 1827 in Prague in Bohemia, Austrian Empire. From 1844 to 1850, he studied at the Academy of Fine Arts, Prague, with Christian Ruben (figurative painting) and Max Haushofer (landscape painting). In 1850, he went to Düsseldorf to continue his studies with Johann Wilhelm Schirmer.

The following year, he began work in Prague as a theatre decorator. In 1854, he married the actress and writer Minna Jaich, daughter of the scenic designer Anton Jaich. They had a daughter and three sons, one of whom was the Marxist theoretician Karl Kautsky.

In 1863, he was appointed a decorative artist for the Vienna State Opera. The following year, he became a partner in the studios of Carlo Brioschi. Two years later the Viennese Court Painter, Hermann Burghart, was added to the partnership, creating the firm of "Brioschi, Burghart und Kautsky, k.u.k. Hoftheatermaler in Wien", which employed dozens of carpenters, blacksmiths, mechanics and clerks in addition to their painters; among whom were Georg Janny, Leopold Rothaug, Ferdinand Brunner and Alfons Mucha. The studio received many orders from abroad as well as locally. Among their regular customers was the Metropolitan Opera in New York.

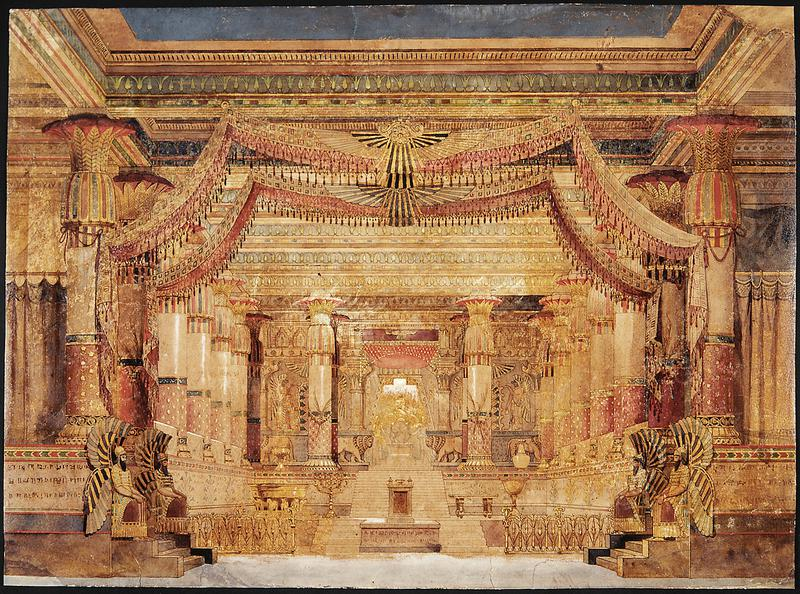
Set design for The Queen of Sheba, an opera by Karl Goldmark

Brioschi and Kautsky slowly gave up active participation in the firm, which was led by Burghart until his retirement in 1892.

That same year, Kautsky bought out his partners and handed the company over to his sons, Hans and Fritz, who joined with the Italian-born painter, Franz Angelo Rottonara, and operated under the name "Kautskys Söhne und Rottonara". They remained in business for several more decades.
