= Blatchley =

Blatchley may refer to:

People

- Emily Blatchley (1842–1874), British Protestant Christian missionary to China with the China Inland Mission
- John Polwhele Blatchley (1913–2008), London-born car designer; worked with J Gurney Nutting and Rolls-Royce
- Willis Blatchley (1859–1940), American entomologist, malacologist and geologist
- Thomas Blatchley (1615–1674), Puritan settler; founding member of Hartford Connecticut
- Cornelius Blatchley (1773–1831), American physician, Quaker dissident; first published critic of Mormonism

Heritage

- Blatchley Hall, on the campus of the College of Idaho in Caldwell, Canyon County, Idaho, built in 1910
- Blatchley House, historic house located at 370 Blatchley Road near Jordanville, Herkimer County, New York
- Willis S. Blatchley House, national historic site located at 232 Lee Street, Dunedin, Pinellas County, Florida

Education

- Blatchley middle school in Sitka School District, Alaska

== See also ==
- Batley
- Blatch
- Blatchleya
- Latchley
