= George Mudie (social reformer) =

Scottish social reformer and publisher (1788–1849+)

George Mudie (1788 – 1849+) was a Scottish social reformer, Owenite, co-operator, journalist and publisher. He founded one of the first co-operative communities in the United Kingdom and edited several publications in which he attacked the established theories of political economy.

== Biography ==
=== Early life ===
Mudie was born in Edinburgh in 1788. In 1812 he was a member of a discussion group that met in St Andrew's Chapel, Edinburgh, and he tried to persuade that group to form a newsroom. When the group refused to take up this idea, he left Scotland and spent the next few years working as the editor of a succession of English provincial newspapers: The Nottingham Gazette, The Leeds Intelligencer, The Leeds Independent and The Leeds Gazette. In 1816, while living in Leeds, Mudie met Robert Owen and quickly became a supporter of the latter's co-operative principles and ideas for social reform.

=== The Economist and Spa Fields ===
Mudie moved to London in 1820, where he became editor of The Sun newspaper. In August that year he addressed a meeting of printers at Mitchell's Assembly Rooms, where he outlined a plan, based on Owen's ideas, to form a community. The printers set up a committee, which included Henry Hetherington, to evaluate the scheme and its favourable report, produced in January 1821, led to the formation of the Co-operative and Economical Society and the launch of its weekly journal, The Economist (January 1821-March 1822), which Mudie edited.

Although Mudie was fulsome in his praise for Owen, their respective conceptions of co-operation differed. Mudie played down Owen's interest in the formation of human character, concentrating on the practical advantages of communal living. He stressed the importance of communal self-help, rather than Owen's philanthropic approach. Above all, Mudie believed that the co-operative movement had to be based on sound economic principles, which, he argued, could not be found in the theories of established political economists, such as David Ricardo and Thomas Malthus. Mudie's articles in The Economist include critiques of laissez-faire capitalism and he was one of the earliest writers to suggest that the economy should be planned and regulated, instead of being left to the vagaries of market forces. In this respect, he held similar views to Ricardian socialists such as John Gray.

On 17 November 1821 Mudie announced that the Co-operative and Economical Society had rented several houses in Guildford Street East and Bagnigge Wells Road, Spa Fields, London, and he would later write that twenty-two families, including his own, had lived together "in perfect harmony" for two years. By March 1822 Mudie's workload with the community was affecting the quality of The Economist and he apologised to readers for its "many blunders". The journal ceased publication on 9 March. Ten months later Mudie commenced another, similar, publication: The Political Economist and Universal Philanthropist (January–February 1823). In this journal Mudie continued to attack orthodox political economy. In particular, he critiqued Ricardo's contention that the natural price of labour was the amount required to enable labourers merely to subsist. Mudie argued that the price of labour was artificial, not natural, because employers kept wages as low as they could, even below subsistence level. His own system of political economy, he said, was founded on two principles:

That Labour is the Source of Wealth. That the producers of Wealth are in justice entitled to the enjoyment or disposal of all fruits, or productions of their own industry.

The journal only lasted for two months. Several months later Mudie was forced by the proprietors of The Sun to either resign as its editor or abandon the community. He chose the latter and the Spa Fields community was dispersed.

=== Orbiston and Edinburgh ===
Mudie's next co-operative venture was in 1825 at Orbiston, near Motherwell, Scotland, where Abram Combe was creating a new Owenite community. Mudie's involvement, however, was brief and acrimonious. He invested all his money in the project but soon quarrelled with Combe, whom he accused of being both managerially incompetent and an "absolute dictator". He left the community, lost all his money and found himself "thrown destitute, with my large family, upon the world".

He moved back to Edinburgh, where he would stay for the next six or so years. During this period he founded another co-operative society, the United Interests Society, addressed numerous meetings of trade societies and published another journal, The Advocate of the Working Classes (January–April 1827). The United Interests Society had around 600 members and opened its own bakery in South Hanover Street, but dissolved itself in 1827. Mudie temporarily ceased his co-operative activities and took up popular journalism. Commencing in September 1831, his publication The Edinburgh Cornucopia, which he later renamed The Cornucopia Britannica , was a magazine which sought to bring low-cost literature to a mass audience. It sold well at first but ceased publication in March 1832, after which Mudie moved back to London.

=== Exchange bazaars and the "Marcus" affair ===
On his arrival Mudie presented himself at Owen's headquarters in Gray's Inn Road to offer his services, but did not feel that he was made welcome. As he later said, "I therefore held myself aloof, – determined to promote the cause of co-operation as much as in me lay, by my own efforts".

He soon became involved in the burgeoning equitable labour exchange movement, a time-based currency system in which goods were exchanged on the basis of “equal value for labour through the medium of labour notes”. His journal The Gazette of the Exchange Bazaars (September–November 1832) was mainly concerned with explaining the theory of equitable exchange; and Mudie was highly critical of the operating principles adopted by Owen's National Equitable Labour Exchange.

Little is known about Mudie's activities during the mid-1830s. He attended trade society meetings and argued for the introduction of a national minimum wage. He also played a small part in the "War of the Unstamped" by helping the radical publisher Benjamin Cousins register a printing press in a false name, in order to avoid having Cousins' assets seized.

In the late 1830s Mudie edited another journal: The Alarm Bell!, or Herald of the Spirit of Truth. This was written in response to the notorious "Marcus" pamphlets, which had proposed (possibly satirically) that population should be controlled by gassing the new-born children of the poor. Mudie accused "Marcus" of taking Malthus's theory of population to its logical conclusion and argued that Britain was capable of supporting five times its present population.

=== Later years ===
By 1840 Mudie was living at 243½ The Strand, London, where he gave private lessons in English grammar and wrote a school text-book with visual aids: The Grammar of the English Language truly made Easy and Amusing by the Invention of Three Hundred Moveable Parts of Speech (J. Cleave, London, 1840). He had also written a children's alphabet reader: The Illuminated Temple of Letters, and announced that he was planning to produce books on shorthand writing, the philosophy of grammar and "A Musical and Mechanical key to the Infant Soul", but of these works only the grammar text-book survives.

During the 1840s Mudie published another co-operative pamphlet, A New Benefit Society for the Working Class, but his attempts to form the society foundered. By 1848 he had moved to 23 Parr Street, Hoxton, London, from where he again offered his services to Owen, admitting that he had spent the last few years in poverty. Owen, however, rejected his offer. The following year, in response to the French Revolution of 1848, Mudie produced A Solution of the Portentous Enigma of Modern Civilization (London, 1849). In this, he criticised the French government for the way in which it had organised unemployed workers into "national workshops" . This was Mudie's final known pamphlet.

== Mudie in print ==
- George Mudie. A Few Particulars Respecting the Secret History of the Late Forum (Edinburgh, 1812)
- The Economist (London, 27 January 1821 – 9 March 1822), edited by George Mudie
- The Political Economist and Universal Philanthropist (London, January–February 1823), edited by George Mudie
- The Advocate of the Working Classes (Edinburgh, January–April 1827), edited by George Mudie
- The Edinburgh Cornucopia / The Cornucopia Britannica (Edinburgh, September 1831-March 1832), edited by George Mudie
- The Gazette of the Exchange Bazaars, and Practical Guide to the Rapid Establishment of the Public Prosperity (London, September–November 1832), edited by George Mudie
- The Cornucopia Britannica (London, 1838), edited by George Mudie
- The Alarm Bell!, or Herald of the Spirit of Truth (London, 1838/9), edited by George Mudie
- George Mudie. The Grammar of the English Language truly made Easy and Amusing by the Invention of Three Hundred Moveable Parts of Speech (J. Cleave, London, 1840)
- George Mudie. A Solution of the Portentious Enigma of Modern Civilization (London, 1849)
