= Owenism =

Utopian socialist philosophy

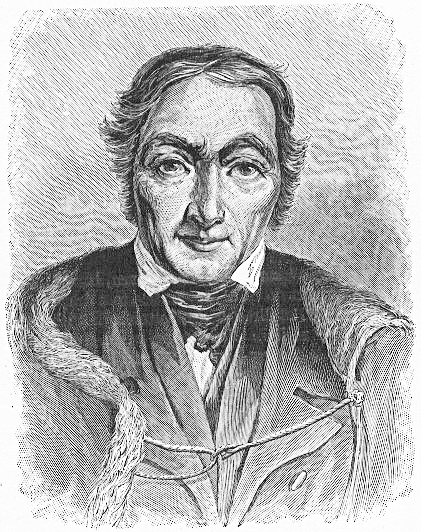
Robert Owen, after whom Owenism is named

Owenism is the utopian socialist philosophy of 19th-century social reformer Robert Owen and his followers and successors, who are known as Owenites. Owenism aimed for radical reform of society and is considered a forerunner of the cooperative movement. The Owenite movement undertook several experiments in the establishment of utopian communities organized according to communitarian and cooperative principles. One of the best known of these efforts, which was unsuccessful, was the project at New Harmony, Indiana, which started in 1825 and was abandoned by 1827. Owenism is also closely associated with the development of the British trade union movement, and with the spread of the Mechanics' Institute movement.

== Economic thought ==
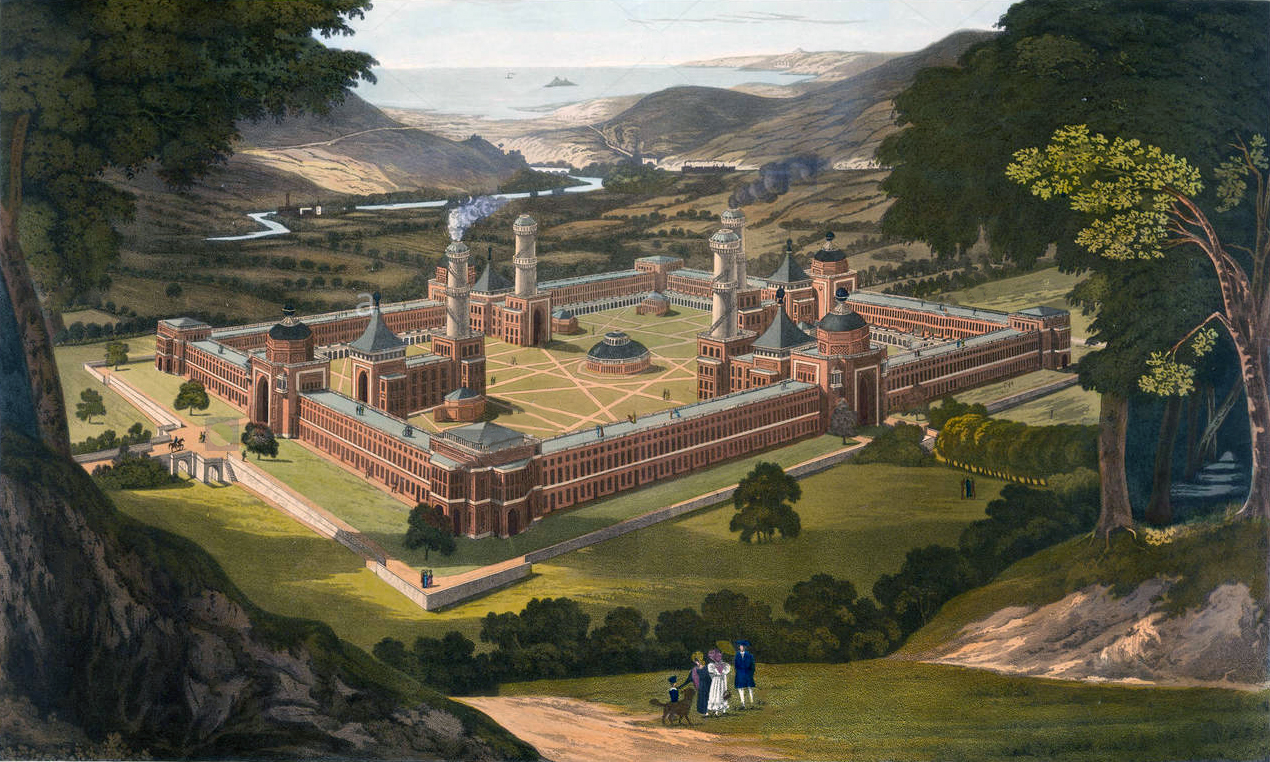
New Harmony, a utopian attempt; depicted as proposed by Robert Owen

Owen's economic thought grew out of widespread poverty in Britain in the aftermath of the Napoleonic Wars. His thought was rooted in 17th-century English "moral economy" ideals of "fair exchange, just price, and the right to charity." "Utopian socialist" economic thought such as Owen's was a reaction to the laissez-faire impetus of Malthusian Poor Law reform. Claeys notes that "Owen’s 'Plan' began as a grandiose but otherwise not exceptionally unusual workhouse scheme to place the unemployed poor in newly built rural communities." Owen’s "plan" was itself derivative of (and ultimately popularized by) a number of Irish and English trade unionists such as William Thompson and Thomas Hodgskin, co-founder of the London Mechanics Institute. When this poverty led to revolt, as it did in Glasgow in April 1820, a "committee of gentlemen" from the area commissioned the cotton manufacturer and philanthropist, Robert Owen, to produce a "Report to the County of Lanark" in May 1820, which recommended a new form of pauper relief; the cooperative village. Owen's villages thus needed to be compared with the Dickensian "Houses of Industry" that were created after the passage of the 1834 Poor Law amendment act. Owen's report was to spark a widespread "socialist" movement that established co-operatives, labour exchanges, and experimental communities in the United Kingdom, the United States, and Canada. Owen was to disseminate his ideas in North America beginning in 1824. His ideas were most widely received in New York and Philadelphia, where he was greeted by nascent working men's parties.

Owen was no theoretician, and the Owenite movement drew on a broad range of thinkers such as William Thompson, John Gray, Abram Combe, Robert Dale Owen, George Mudie, John Francis Bray, Dr William King, and Josiah Warren. These men rooted their thought in Ricardian socialism and the labour theory of value.

== Utopian communities ==
=== United Kingdom ===
- New Lanark, founded by David Dale, passed on to a partnership that included Robert Owen, who became mill manager in 1800. In Owen's time approximately 2500 people worked at the mill, many from the poorhouses of Edinburgh and Glasgow. He improved conditions there notably, focusing in particular on children, for whom he provided the first infant school in 1817.The mills were a commercial success. When other partners were unhappy at the expense occurred by his welfare programs, Owen bought them out. New Lanark today is recognized by UNESCO and is one of Scotland's six world heritage sites.
- George Mudie, a printer, formed an Owenite community at Spa Fields, in the London Borough of Islington between 1821 and 1824. Mudie published a weekly journal, the Economist, which ran from 27 January 1821 to 9 March 1822. The printer Henry Hetherington was a member. Mudie moved to Orbiston after this community failed.
- Archibald James Hamilton, the radical laird of Dalzell and Orbiston, owned an estate 8 miles outside Glasgow. He was one of the gentlemen who commissioned Robert Owens’ "Report to the County of Lanark". In 1821, he and several other Owenite sympathizers such as Abram Combe formed the Edinburgh Practical Society that operated a co-operative store, and a school. In addition, Hamilton provided his 290-acre estate, Orbiston, for the first Owenite co-operative community in the United Kingdom, in 1825. The community collapsed in 1827 on the death of its founder.
- Ralahine Community, County Clare, Ireland (1831–1833) was organized on the estate of John Vandeleur by Edward T. Craig. Unlike other Owenite communities, workers were paid "labour notes" which they could spend in the co-operative store. By this time, Owenism had moved on to its Labour Exchange phase. The experiment ended when Vandeleur lost his estate through gambling.
- Manea Fen Colony, near Manea, Cambridgeshire (1838–1841), was founded by the local farmer William Hodson on his own land. The community built a school, workshops and a brickworks, and published its own weekly newspaper, The Working Bee, before it was dissolved in 1841.
- Harmony Hall Community at Queenwood Farm, Hampshire (1839–1845). This is the only other colony than New Harmony in Indiana founded by Robert Owen himself. In 1839 his Association of Classes of All Nations acquired five hundred acres at Queenwood farm.

=== United States ===
- New Harmony, Indiana (1825–27). Founded by Robert Owen himself. He purchased the community of New Harmony from the religious communists known as the Rappites. The influential Owenite newspaper, "The Free Enquirer" was published here.
- Yellow Springs, Ohio on a site now occupied by Antioch College, Miami Township, Greene County (1825).
- Nashoba Commune, Tennessee (1825–28) was organized by Fanny Wright to educate and emancipate slaves. To ensure emancipation without financial loss to slaveholders, slaves would buy their freedom and then be transported to the independent settlements of Liberia and Haiti.
- Franklin or Haverstraw Community, Haverstraw, Rockland County, New York (1826).
- Forestville Commonwealth, Lapham's Mills, Coxsackie, Greene County, New York (1826–1827). Also known as the "Coxsackie Community." Founded by Dr. Samuel Underhill, under the influence of Dr Cornelius Blatchly's "An Essay on Common Wealths" (1822). Saddled with debt, 27 members decided to join the Kendal community, leaving on 23 Oct. 1827.
- Kendal Community, Ohio, Massillon, Ohio (1825–9). Also known as "Friendly Association of Mutual Interests at Kendal."
- Valley Forge Community, Valley Forge, Chester County, PA (1826). Also known as "Friendly Association of Mutual Interests."
- Blue Spring Community, Van Buren Township, Monroe County, Indiana (1826)
- Promisewell Community, Munroe County, PA (1843). Also known as the Society of One-Mentians.
- Goose Pond Community, Pike County, PA (1843). An offshoot of Promisewell, built on the site of Fourierist phalanx "Social Reform Unity."
- Hunt's Colony, Spring Lake, Mukwonago Township, Waukesha County, Wisconsin (1843). Also known as the Colony of Equality. Founded by several English organizations.

=== Canada ===
- When Orbiston collapsed in 1827 on the death of its founder, most of the residents moved to Upper Canada, where they formed the short-lived Owenite community of Maxwell near Sarnia.

== Co-operative movement and labour exchange ==
Although the early emphasis in Owenism was on the formation of utopian communities, these communities were predicated upon co-operative labour, and frequently, co-operative sales. For example, the Edinburgh Practical Society created by the founders of Orbiston operated a co-operative store to raise the capital for the community. Abram Combe, the leader of that community, was to author the pamphlet The Sphere for Joint Stock Companies (1825), which made clear that Orbiston was not to be a self-subsistent commune, but a co-operative trading endeavor.

For the majority of Owenites who did not live in these utopian communities, the working-class Owenite tradition was composed of three overlapping institutions: "the cooperative store, the labour exchange and the trade union."

The cooperative ideas of Owen and Combe were further developed by the Brighton doctor, William King, publisher of "The Co-operator." Although the paper was only published for two years between 1827 and 1829, it served to unify the movement.

The next attempt to broaden the cooperative movement was the British Association for the Promotion of Co-operative Knowledge (B.A.P.C.K.) founded in 1829. It was the successor to the London Cooperative Society, and served as a clearing house of information for Britain's 300 cooperatives. It provided pamphlets, lectures and "missionaries" for the movement. It held its quarterly meetings in the London Mechanics Institute, with frequent lectures from William Lovett, and many other radical Owenites who would go on to lead the London Working Men's Association. B.A.P.C.K. rejected joint stock cooperative efforts as "systems of competition." Its aim was the establishment of an agricultural, manufacturing or trading community. They recognized that the success of cooperation depended upon parliamentary reform, and this proved the basis for working with the radical reformers who would go on to create the Chartist movement.

The National Equitable Labour Exchange was founded in London in 1832 and spread to several English cities, most notably Birmingham, before closing in 1834. Beginning from the Ricardian Socialist view that labour was the source of all value, the exchange issued "Labour Notes" similar to banknotes, denominated in hours. John Gray proposed a National Chamber of Commerce as a central bank issuing a labour currency. A similar time-based currency would be created by an American Owenite, Josiah Warren, who founded the Cincinnati Time Store. A short-lived Labour Exchange was also founded in 1836 in Kingston, Upper Canada.

== Political and labour organization ==
Robert Owen was resolutely apolitical, and initially pursued a non-class based form of community organization. However, as the focus of the movement shifted from the formation of utopian communities to cooperatives, Owenites became active in labour organization in both the United Kingdom and the United States. In the United Kingdom, Owenites became further involved in electoral reform (now envisioned as part of a broader Reform Movement).

=== United Kingdom ===
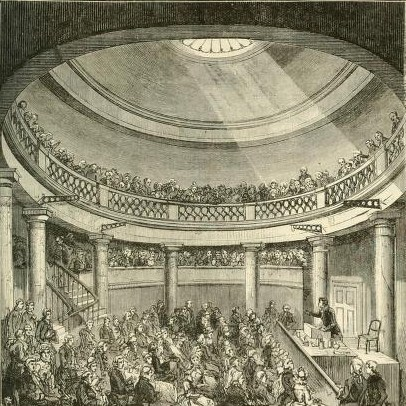
Interior view of the Blackfriars Rotunda, where the N.U.W.C. met.

Between 1829 and 1835, Owenite socialism was politicized through two organizations; the British Association for the Promotion of Co-operative Knowledge, and its successor, the National Union of the Working Classes (founded in 1831, and abandoned in 1835). The aim of B.A.P.C.K. was to promote cooperatives, but its members recognized that political reform was necessary if they were to achieve that end. They thus formed a "Political Union" which was the principal form of political activity in the period before the Reform Act 1832. Political Unions organized petitioning campaigns meant to sway parliament. The B.A.P.C.K. leadership thus formed the National Union of the Working Classes (N.U.W.C.) to push for a combination of Owenism and radical democratic political reform.

Owen himself resisted the N.U.W.C.'s political efforts at reform, and by 1833, he was an acknowledged leader of the British trade union movement. In February 1834, he helped form Britain's first national labour organization, the Grand National Consolidated Trades Union. The organisation began to break up in the summer of 1834 and by November, it had ceased to function.

It was from this heady mix of working class trade unionism, co-operativism, and political radicalism in the disappointed wake of the 1832 Reform Bill and the 1834 New Poor Law, that a number of prominent Owenite leaders such as William Lovett, John Cleave and Henry Hetherington helped form the London Working Men's Association in 1836. The London Working Men's Association led the Chartist movement demanding universal suffrage. Many have viewed Owenite socialism and Chartism as mutually hostile because of Owen's refusal to engage in politics. However, Chartists and Owenites were "many parts but one body" in this initial stage.

=== United States ===
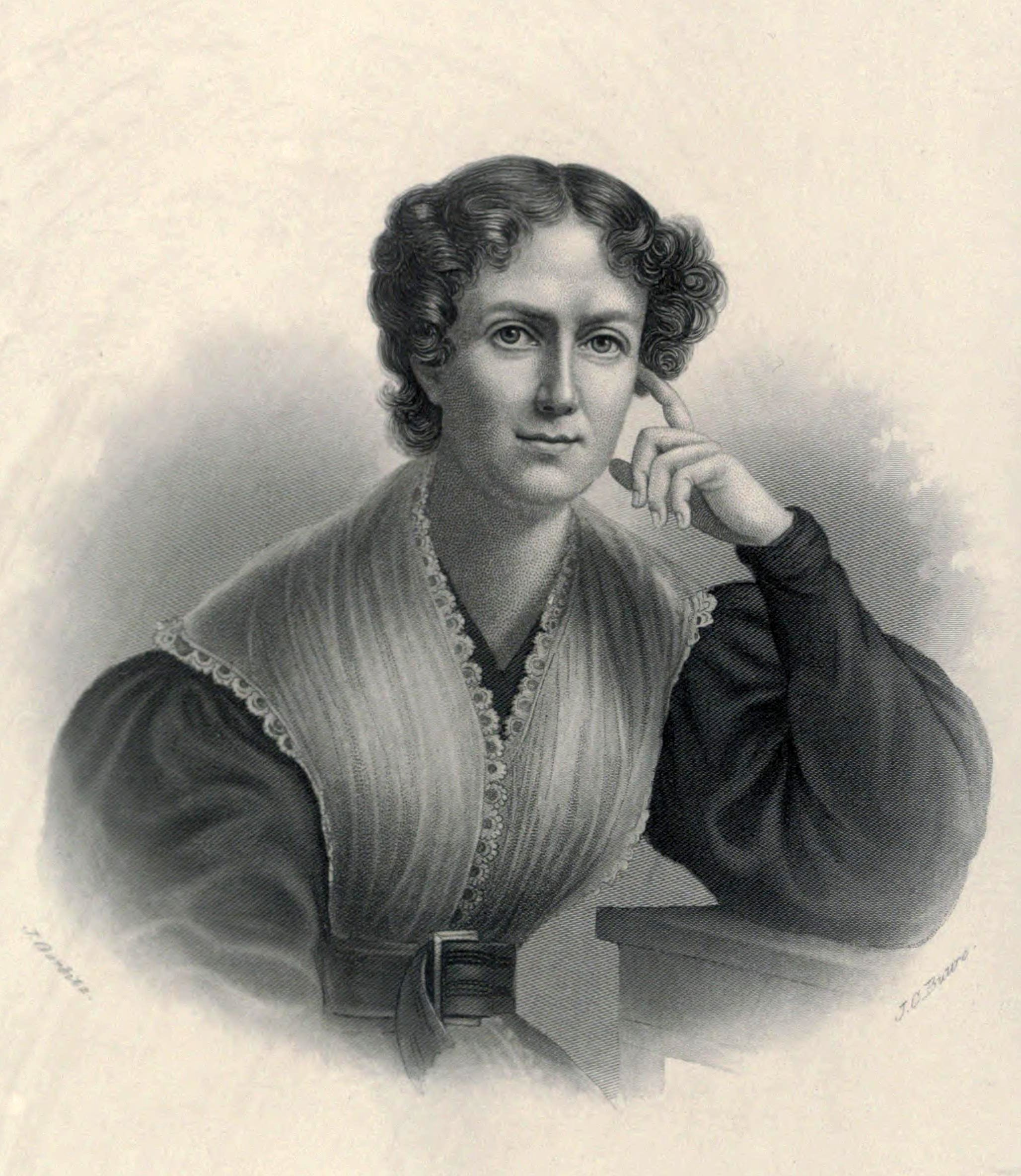
Frances Wright, c. 1825

Robert Dale Owen emigrated to the United States in 1825 to help his father run New Harmony, Indiana. After the community dissolved, Robert Dale Owen moved to New York City and became the co-editor of the Free Enquirer, a socialistic and anti-Christian weekly, with Frances Wright, the founder of the Nashoba community, from 1828 to 1832. They also founded a "Hall of Science" in New York like those being created by Owenites in the United Kingdom. From this base, Owen and Wright sought to influence the Working Men's Party.

The Working Men's Party emerged spontaneously out of strike action by journeymen in 1829 who protested having to work more than 10 hours a day. They appointed a Committee of Fifty to discuss organization, and they proposed running a ticket of journeymen in the legislative elections. At the same time, Owen and Wright were continuing their own efforts to organize New York City's working classes. The two groups uneasily merged, and were encouraged by their success in the elections. To support the movement, George Henry Evans began publishing the Working Man's Advocate.

The new party quickly fell victim to factionalism over several controversial proposals. Owen's controversial contribution was a proposed "state guardianship plan" where children would be removed from their homes at the age of two and placed in government run schools, to protect them from the degeneracy of slum life and allow their optimum development through free schooling. By late 1830, the party was effectively dead.

=== Canada ===
Owenism was introduced to Upper Canada (now Ontario) in 1835 by the Rev. Thaddeus Osgood, a Montreal-based evangelical minister. Osgood returned to London in 1829. Deep in debt, he was unable to return to Canada, and spent the succeeding five years preaching in London's workhouses and prisons. It was in this working class milieu that Osgood met and debated with Robert Owen. Although attracted by the "home colony" model of poverty relief, Osgood was offended by Owens’ anti-religious rhetoric. Drawing on Owenism, rather than Owen, Osgood proposed to found "Relief Unions" for the poor when he finally returned to Canada in 1835. Through Osgood's influence, Robert Owens’ ideas were widely debated in Toronto. Osgood's proposal elicited support from across Upper Canada in early 1836, and petitions for the Relief Union's incorporation were sent to the Assembly and Legislative Council. Significantly, Osgood's plan was proposed at the same time as the new Lt. Governor, Sir Francis Bond Head was arriving in Toronto. Bond Head was an Assistant Poor Law Administrator, and intent on imposing workhouses for the poor, not Owenite colonies.

== Acknowledgements ==
In Chapter III of The Communist Manifesto, Karl Marx analyzes Owenism as a species of utopian socialism that developed in the "early undeveloped period" of the struggle between the bourgeoisie and proletariat— and that formerly put out literature "full of the most valuable materials for the enlightenment of the working class". However, Marx interprets Owenism as having, by the time of his writing in 1848, parted ways with Chartism to become a "reactionary sect" that is "compelled to appeal to the feelings and purses of the bourgeois class" to receive the funding necessary for utopian communities or other projects. Remaining advocates of Owenism, claims Marx, now "violently oppose all political action on the part of the working class" such as Chartist advocacy for extension of suffrage; ″The Owenites in England, and the Fourierists in France, respectively, oppose the Chartists and Reformists."

== See also ==
- Orbiston Community
- Cooperative
- Owenstown
