= Spa Fields =

Park in London, England

Coordinates: 51.5257°N 0.1082°W

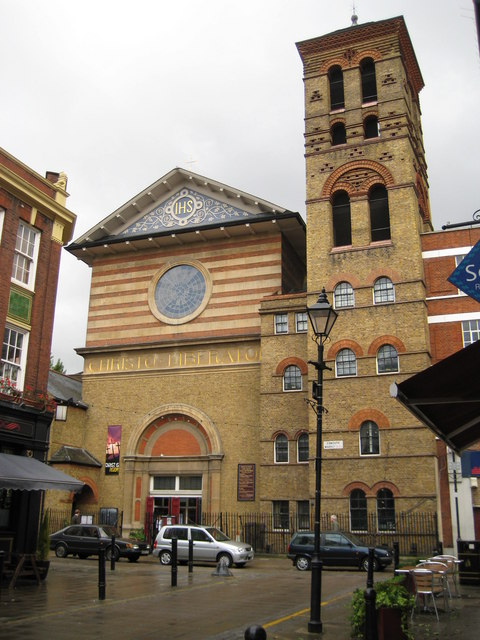
Church of Our Most Holy Redeemer, Exmouth Market (built in the grounds of Spa Fields Chapel in 1888)

Spa Fields is a park and its surrounding area in the London Borough of Islington, bordering Finsbury and Clerkenwell. Historically it is known for the Spa Fields riots of 1816 and an Owenite community which existed there between 1821 and 1824. The park, or open common, was once of 14 hectares but was mostly built over in the 19th century, beginning in the 1830s, and is now a small park, popular with office workers at lunchtime, and as a children's playground.

A large surrounding area was once called by the name, but this is now less common. In the 18th century it was a disreputable area, known for "the rude sports that were in vogue, such as duck-hunting, prize-fighting, bull-baiting, and others of an equally demoralising character", and "seems to have been much infected by sneaking footpads, who knocked down pedestrians passing to and from London, and despoiled them of hats, wigs, silver buckles, and money", The moral tone gradually improved after the Spa Fields Chapel was erected in 1777 by the Countess of Huntingdon, a famous Evangelical.

== Owenite community ==
The community was established in a number of properties at Guildford Street East, Bagnigge Wells Road and Spa Fields, London. The community was based on the cooperative ideas of Robert Owen and was the idea of George Mudie (b. 1788). On 23 January 1821, a group of printers met at Mitchell's Assembly Rooms, London, to discuss Mudie's proposals for a community, and at this meeting a committee was appointed. They met at the Medallic Cabinet, 158 The Strand, to raise money. As part of the fund-raising effort, Mudie began publication of a weekly journal, the Economist, which ran from 27 January 1821 to 9 March 1822.

The plan was soon formulated to create a "Co-operative and Economical Society" of 200 families. The male members had to contribute a guinea to the central fund. There would be a communal kitchen and dining hall, plus there were plans for a school as well. The committee calculated that the community would save around £8,000 per year through its own manufacture of various items that it would use. Mudie believed that the community would be able to become independent.

During this period the chairman was George Hinde and one prominent member was the printer Henry Hetherington.

By December 1821, the "Spa Fields Congregational families" had begun to live together. The women worked from 6am to 8pm, and the children were also kept busy "without a moment's intermission". The community advertised various services that they would provide, such as cobbling, painting, haberdashery, etc., and they also announced that they would be opening a school run on approved Fellenbergian lines.

The community also set up a "monitor" system whereby each monitor looked after one person and acted as his "confessor".

Mudie found himself working very hard to maintain the community, but this affected the quality of the Economist. The publication ceased in March 1822 and the community continued for another two years. The reasons for its demise are not known, but Mudie immersed himself in another community, at Orbiston, run by Abram Combe, but could not agree with Combe and also left this community after a year or so.
