= Orbiston Community =

First Owenite community in Britain, 1825–1828

Orbiston was a short-lived Owenite co-operative community established in 1825 near Bellshill in Lanarkshire, Scotland. It is generally regarded as the first Owenite community in Britain.

The community was founded by Abram Combe and Archibald James Hamilton, both followers of Robert Owen, on part of the Hamilton family's Orbiston estate. Combe and Hamilton had been among the sympathisers who, inspired by Owen's Report to the County of Lanark, formed the Edinburgh Practical Society in 1821.

Construction of a large residential block, nicknamed the "New Babylon", began in 1825, and the first families moved in during 1826. The settlement included a school, a theatre, a foundry and forge, a printing press and workshops, alongside farming and a range of trades. Combe invested heavily in the venture, buying land from Hamilton and spending large sums on its buildings.

The community lost its guiding figure when Combe, who was suffering from lung disease, died on 19 September 1827. Without him the project could not be sustained, and it was wound up in 1828. The buildings were later demolished and no trace of the community survives.
