= John Gray (socialist) =

British socialist economist (1799–1883)

John Gray (1799 – 26 April 1883) was a British newspaper proprietor and economist. His first published work, A Lecture on Human Happiness, was broadly supportive of the ideas of Robert Owen, although he would later criticise Owen's communitarianism. Gray's critique of laissez-faire capitalism is usually associated with the school of Ricardian socialism and he was one of the earliest writers to advocate a centrally-planned economy.

== Biography ==
=== Early life ===
Gray was born in Derbyshire and attended Repton School. He was, by his own admission, a poor scholar, who spent most of his time fishing, climbing trees and playing marbles, and his final school report described him as "possessing abilities, rising barely to mediocrity".

He left school at fourteen and was employed by a wholesale and manufacturing company in Cheapside, London. His job took him all over London and the conditions that he witnessed convinced him that there was something wrong with the way that the economy functioned. He later wrote, "I saw clearly that goods of every description are made either because they are ordered, or because there is every prospect of their being so; and continued reflection satisfied me that this state of things ought to be reversed,— that production, instead of being the effect of demand, ought to be the cause of it".

After reading Adam Smith's The Wealth of Nations, Gray wrote a manuscript called The National Commercial System, but friends persuaded him that it was poorly written and should not be published. At his brother's suggestion he started to read the writings of Robert Owen and soon realised that their views coincided. His revised thoughts were published in a pamphlet, A Lecture on Human Happiness (1825).

=== A Lecture on Human Happiness ===
Gray's Lecture contained some of the key tenets of both Owenism and what would later be called Ricardian socialism. His starting point was that humans are by nature social creatures, imbued with a desire for happiness. This desire can only be achieved when basic human wants are satisfied, and the fact that there is so much misery in the world proves that society is constructed upon the wrong principles.

He said that the entire wealth of the country was created by productive labour, which he defined as "labouring people, employed in agriculture mines and minerals; artisans, handicrafts, mechanics and labourers employed in manufactories, buildings, and works of every kind". He regarded everyone else as unproductive and therefore a direct tax on the productive classes. Furthermore, those who failed to give an equivalent for what they consumed were, he said, useless members of society.

Using statistical evidence from Patrick Colquhoun's Treatise on the Wealth, Power and Resources of the British Empire (1814), Gray analysed how much every section of society contributed to the wealth of the nation and compared that to their actual income. To this he added comments, based primarily on his own moral judgements, about the utilitarian value of each occupation to society as a whole. For example, he dismissed the labour of servants as useless, because the only beneficiaries of their work were their wealthy employers.

The productive classes, Gray calculated, only received about one-fifth of the wealth that they created, the other four-fifths being taken from them by rent, interest and capitalist profits. The root cause of this, he argued, was underconsumption. He said that production should only be limited by either the satisfaction of all the wants of society, or the exhaustion of its productive powers. Capitalist competition, however, introduced an artificial barrier to production, limiting it to "demand", which was measured by the amount that could be sold at a profit. This led to job losses and wage cuts, so that labourers could not afford to buy the goods that they needed.

Although he disassociated himself from Owenite views on the formation of character, Gray praised Owen's economic ideas, which he said would abolish the artificial limit of production and give producers the wealth they create. He supported the formation of co-operative communities, where competitive exchange would not exist, and added an annex to his pamphlet containing the Articles of Association for the formation of such a community, drawn up by the London Co-operative Society. Due to production problems, the pamphlet had only limited distribution in Britain, but sold well in the United States and has been credited with influencing the development of socialist ideas in both countries.

=== Edinburgh ===
In 1825 Gray moved to Edinburgh, Scotland, intending to join the community which was being set up by Abram Combe at Orbiston, near Motherwell. He bought shares in the Orbiston Company, but following a brief visit to Orbiston, during which he had been alarmed by what he saw as a lack of management planning, he decided against becoming a community member. In his pamphlet A Word of Advice to the Orbistonians (1826) he warned that too many activities were being undertaken by people who lacked the necessary skills to carry them out and that unless a skilled workforce and a professional manager were brought in the project was doomed to failure. These criticisms, however, would not prevent Gray from writing a generous tribute to Combe after his early death.

Gray remained in Edinburgh, where he founded a free newspaper consisting entirely of advertisements, The Edinburgh and Leith Advertiser. Unfortunately for Gray, the publication of advertisements soon became liable to Stamp Duty, so, in partnership with his brother James, he converted the Advertiser into a regular newspaper, with James as editor. This survived for fifty-three editions, after which the brothers reverted to the purely advertising format with The Edinburgh, Leith, Glasgow and North British Advertiser and later The North British Advertiser).

Gray went through difficult times over the next few years. In 1829 he suffered a mental breakdown, from which his brother helped to nurse him back to health; in 1830 he was briefly imprisoned for debt, following the failure of his project to establish a printers' hall where businesses could share modern machinery; and in 1831 his wife, Caroline, died. The North British Advertiser, however, would eventually make Gray a very wealthy man.

=== The Social System ===
His next publication, The Social System: a Treatise on the Principle of Exchange, appeared in 1831. Although Gray wrote that his views were "substantially the same as those which I entertained many years ago", his criticisms of Owenism were more sharply expressed than in his Lecture on Human Happiness. He strongly objected to Owen's policy of equal distribution of property, and dismissed as delusional the Owenite belief that a person's character had to be improved before they could become wealthy. Although he still believed in the concept of co-operation, it was not in any communitarian sense, but "merely a thoroughly organized plan of producing, exchanging and distributing the wealth of this country".

The Social System was one of the earliest attempts to articulate a centrally-planned economy. Gray's plan involved the creation of a National Chamber of Commerce (NCC), which would exercise complete control over the cultivation, manufacture and distribution of food and all other goods. Produce and manufactured goods would be deposited in national warehouses for onward supply to retail shops and the warehouse and shop managers would all be employed by the NCC. Wages and prices would be determined by the NCC, which would also be able to increase or limit production of any items, depending on whether there were too many or too few of them being produced. The system was voluntary and owners of land and capital who opted in would be compensated by a fixed annual fee. There would be no competition over the employment of capital but Gray's system allowed for labourers who produced more or better quality goods to be paid extra. The value of goods would be based on labour time (given a financial value by averaging wages paid over the last few years), plus cost of materials and overheads such as rent, interest, salaries of NCC managers, replacement of stock and other capital investment.

Gray also proposed the establishment of a National Bank to regulate the supply and value of money. He argued that gold was inappropriate as a medium of exchange, as it was a commodity governed by a competitive system and therefore subject to price fluctuation. He had the same objection to paper banknotes, which, he said, were issued on the basis of securities whose value exceeded that of the notes themselves. It was fear of money losing its value that caused manufacturers to limit production to the quantity that could be sold at a profit and the only way to rectify this, according to Gray, was for money to have no intrinsic value of its own. It should merely represent the value that its holder had either contributed to the national stock or acquired from the person who had contributed it. The National Bank would ensure that production became the source of demand by increasing the money supply as production increased and decreasing it when produce was redemanded or consumed.

=== Later works ===
Not many copies of The Social System were sold and Gray published nothing more on the subject for eleven years. During this time he married Jane Renny and they had at least two children, one of whom died in infancy. He remained in partnership with his brother James and their newspaper, The North British Advertiser, flourished, eventually achieving a circulation of 19,000. By the early 1840s he was wealthy enough to live at Faldonside, a large country house near Galashiels.

Gray's subsequent writings were primarily concerned with elaborating his views on the defects of the existing monetary system and the importance of production becoming the cause of demand. The aims and basic mechanisms of his Social System were still intact, but he allowed greater scope for market forces. In An Efficient Remedy for the Distress of Nations (1842) production would still be controlled by the NCC, but retail distribution would be in private hands and prices would be regulated only by competition amongst the vendors. In 1848 Gray gave a series of lectures to the Edinburgh Philosophical Institution, which were published as Lectures on the Nature and Use of Money. In this book he still claimed that he had not changed his opinions but was now simplifying his plan in order to make it easier to introduce. In doing so he showed more faith in laissez-faire economics than he had previously. His system would now be further deregulated to allow manufacturers to determine the amount of profit they could build into their selling price, limited only by competition. The only regulation involved in fixing the price would be a minimum wage.

In an attempt to give maximum publicity to his ideas, Gray paid for 1200 copies of Lectures to be distributed to Members of Parliament, the House of Lords, newspaper editors and other influential people. He sent some copies to France, offering one to the Provisional Government of the French Second Republic, and others to the United States.

Lectures was Gray's last known work. Between 1854 and 1866 he owned an estate of 26 acres at Bonaly Tower, near Edinburgh, before retiring to Upper Norwood in Surrey, at that time a very wealthy area, where he died in 1883. In his Will Gray's estate was valued at over £14,000, the equivalent of over £1.6 million (2.1 million US$) in 2018.

Gray's monetary theories were critiqued by Karl Marx in his A Contribution to the Critique of Political Economy (1859). Marx argued that Gray's analysis of money and commodities was incomplete and that he had not understood that money represents a definite system of relations of production. This error had led him to the utopian view that capitalism could be eliminated by equalising exchange. Several writers have echoed Marx's criticisms, both of Gray and the Ricardian socialists in general. Some other writers, however, have argued that Gray (at least in his earlier works) and other Ricardian socialists provided some of the foundations that Marx would build upon.

== Gray in print ==
- A Lecture on Human Happiness. (London, 1825)
- A Word of Advice to the Orbistonians. (Edinburgh, 1826)
- An Address to the Printers of Edinburgh. (Edinburgh, 1830)
- The Social System: a Treatise on the Principle of Exchange. (Edinburgh, 1831)
- An Efficient Remedy for the Distress of Nations. (Edinburgh, 1842)
- The Currency Question. (Edinburgh, 1847)
- Lectures on the Nature and Use of Money. (Edinburgh, 1848)

== Sources ==
- Beer, Max, A History of British Socialism. (George Allen and Unwin, 1919)
- Cole, G.D.H., A History of Socialist Thought. Vol. 1: The Forerunners, 1789–1850. (London and New York, 1953)
- Claeys, Gregory, Machinery, Money and the Millennium. (Princeton University Press, 1987)
- Foxwell, H. S., Introduction to Menger, Anton, The Right to the Whole Produce of Labour. (London, 1899)
- Gray, Alexander, The Socialist Tradition. (Longmans, Green & C0., 1946)
- Kimball, J., The Economic Doctrines of John Gray—1799–1883. (Washington, 1948)
- Lowenthal, E., The Ricardian Socialists. (New York, 1911)
- Saad-Filho, A., 'Labour, Money, and "Labour Money": A Review of Marx's Critique of John Gray's Monetary Analysis.' History of Political Economy. 1993 25(1), pp. 65–84.
- Thompson, Noel, The People's Science. (Cambridge, 1984)
- Thompson, Noel, The Market and its Critics: Socialist Political Economy in Nineteenth Century Britain. (London and New York, 1988)
- Thompson, Noel, 'Gray, John (c.1799–1883)', Oxford Dictionary of National Biography. (Oxford University Press, 2004)
