= William King (physician) =

British physician, philanthropist and co-operator (1786–1865)

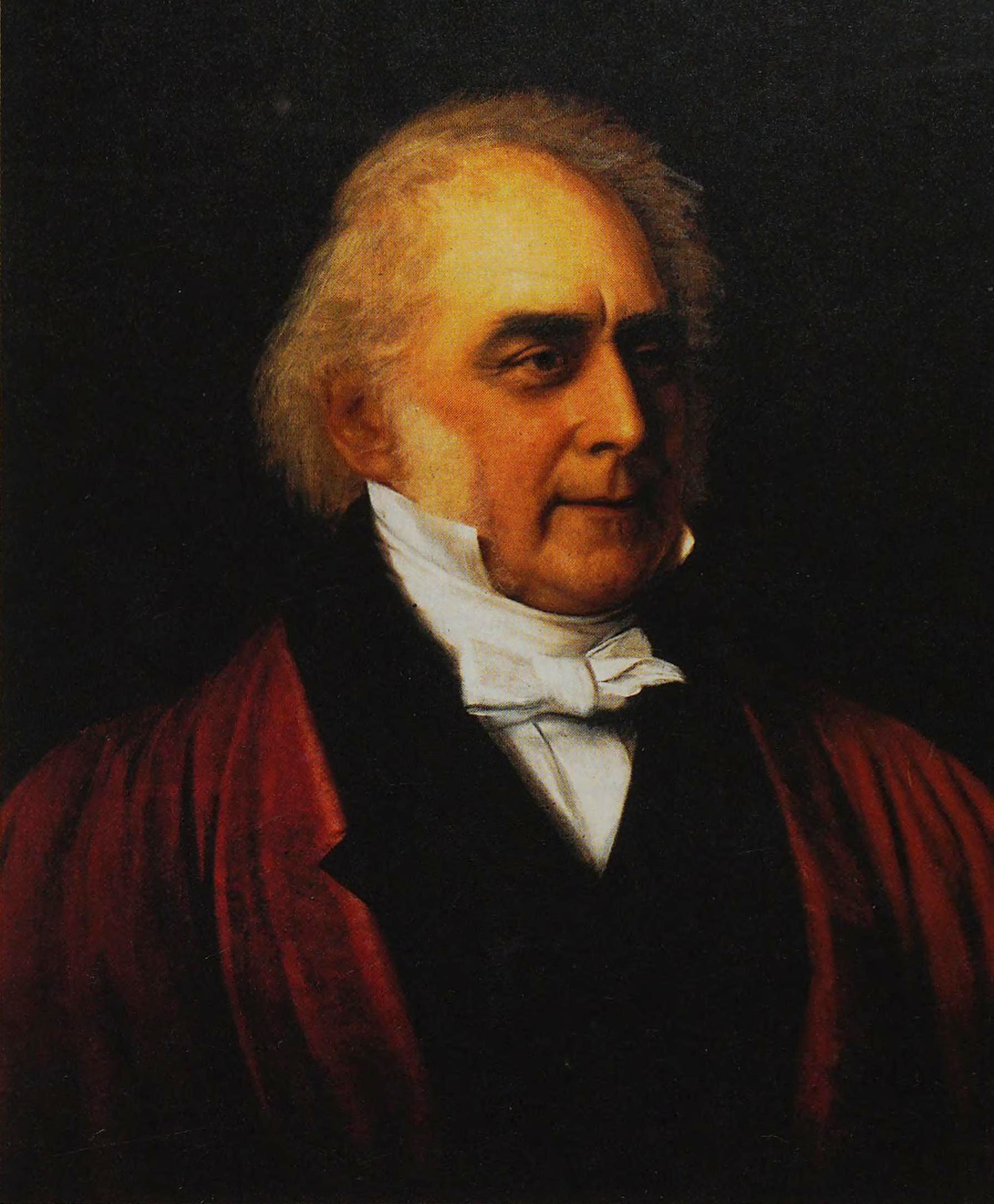
- Born: 17 April 1786; Ipswich, Suffolk, England
- Died: 19 October 1865 (aged 79); Brighton, Sussex, England
- Education: Westminster School
- Alma mater: University of Cambridge (BA, MA, MD)
- Occupation: Physician
- Movement: Co-operative
- Spouse: Mary Hooker (m. 1821)

William King (17 April 1786 – 19 October 1865) was a British physician and philanthropist from Brighton. He was an early supporter of the co-operative movement through the paper he founded, The Co-operator.

William King was the son of Rev. John King, a master at Ipswich School, and Elizabeth Sarah (née Bishop). One brother, John, was a writer of legal books, and another, Richard Henry was a naval officer who served under Philip Broke – a former pupil at Ipswich School – during the capture of USS Chesapeake.

King was born in Lower Brooke Street, Ipswich, Suffolk, but the family subsequently moved nearby to Witnesham when his father retired to the rectory there in 1798. He was educated at Westminster School in London, and then Peterhouse at the University of Cambridge where he obtained a BA and MA. He subsequently studied at St Bartholomew's Hospital in London and then in France in both Paris and Montpellier before returning to Peterhouse where in 1819 he graduated as a Doctor of Medicine. In 1820 he became a fellow of the Royal College of Physicians.

In 1821 he married Mary Hooker, with whom he had at least two children, and he moved to Brighton.

By 1827, Robert Owen had taken his ideas of a co-operative movement to the United States. But they were picked up and amplified by King. King founded a co-operative store in Brighton. Then in May 1828 he started a paper, The Co-operator, to promote these ideas. The Co-operator had wide circulation and a great influence in the emerging movement. Though only published for slightly over two years, the paper served to educate and unify otherwise scattered groups. King's articles in the paper gave the movement some philosophical and practical basis that it had lacked before.

King's overriding rationale for the movement is illustrated by the phrases on the masthead of every issue of The Co-operator:

"Knowledge and union are power. Power, directed by knowledge is happiness. Happiness is the end of creation."

However he faced some criticism in other co-operative publications for his views on radical Owenism. He stopped publishing the paper in August 1830 and distanced himself from the movement, in part because his views, including his support of Catholic emancipation, were affecting his professional reputation. However, he continued to hold his belief in co-operation and supported later co-operative endeavours.

King later worked at the Sussex County Hospital and Brighton Provident Dispensary before retiring in 1861.

King lived at 23 Montpelier Road in the Montpelier area of Brighton where he died on 19 October 1865 due to a heart condition. He was buried at St Andrew's Church, the parish church of Hove.
