= Cornelius Blatchley =

American physician, social reformer, and early critic of Mormonism

Cornelius Camden Blatchley
- Born: 1 January 1773; Mendham, New Jersey, U.S.
- Died: 5 December 1831 (aged 58); New York City, U.S.
- Occupations: Physician, social reformer, writer
- Known for: New York Society for Promoting Communities; early published critique of the Book of Mormon
- Spouses: Catharine Fisher (d. 1808); Elizabeth Coles (m. 1811)
- Children: None known
- Parent(s): Ebenezer Blatchley; Mary (Wick)
- Relatives: Thomas Blatchley

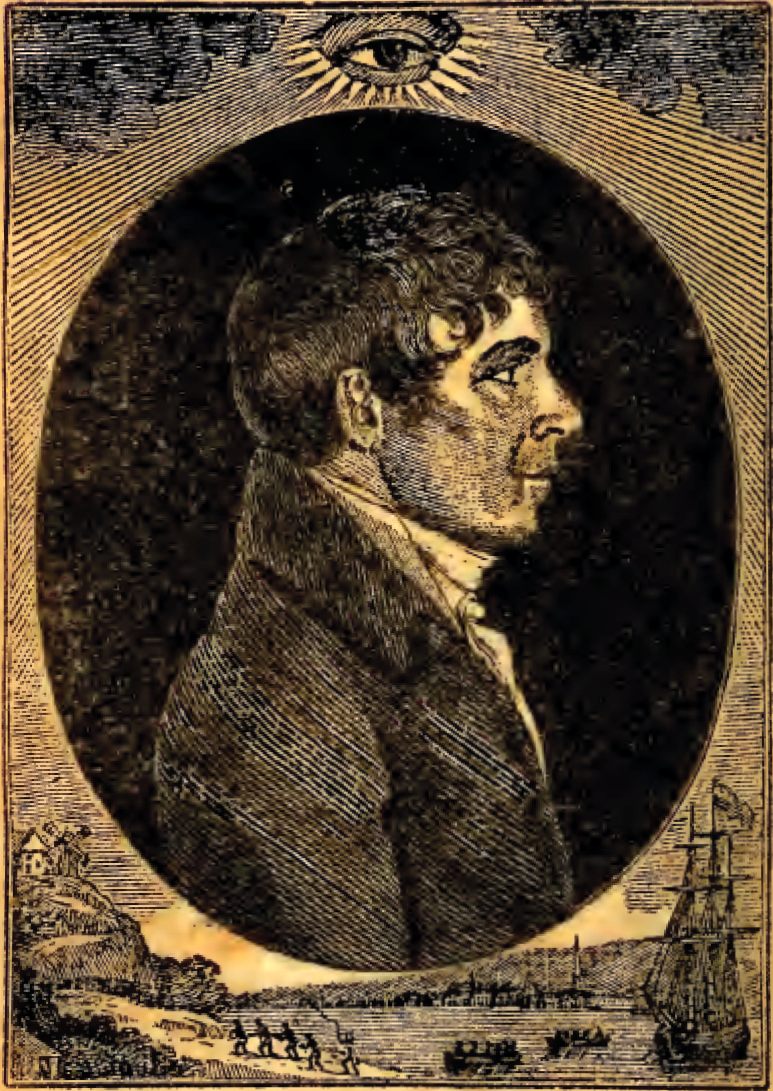
Portrait of Cornelius Blatchley, included along his essay "Popular Poverty" in Thomas Branagan's "The pleasures of contemplation", 1817

Cornelius Camden Blatchley (January 1, 1773 – December 5, 1831) was an American physician, utopian social reformer, Quaker dissident, and one of the earliest published critics of the Book of Mormon. He helped found the New York Society for Promoting Communities (1820), published the communitarian tract An Essay on Common Wealths (1822), and corresponded with Thomas Jefferson and James Madison about education, poverty, and cooperative Christian commonwealths. In February 1830 he published "Caution Against the Golden Bible" in the New-York Telescope, an article widely noted by historians as the first printed critique of Joseph Smith's claims about the "Gold Bible."

== Early life and education ==
Blatchley was born in Mendham, New Jersey, on January 1, 1773, to Ebenezer Blatchley and Mary (Wick). He was raised in the Quaker tradition, which shaped his early ethics and communal ideals. He is descended from the English immigrant Thomas Blatchley, who settled in 17th century New Haven Colony and whose family intermarried with members of the Ball family.

By the 1810s Blatchley was active as a physician in New York City, treating poor and working class patients while developing reform ideas he linked to Christian duty and natural law.

== Medical practice and early writings ==
While practicing medicine, Blatchley published Some Causes of Popular Poverty (1817) as an appendix to Thomas Branagan’s The Pleasures of Contemplation, arguing that interest, rent, inheritance laws, and established churches created systemic poverty contrary to Scripture and natural rights. He followed with An Essay on Fasting, and on Abstinence (1818), which combined medical and moral reasoning for periodic abstinence. In the late 1810s he also promoted a women's circulating library in New York as part of broader education reform.

== Communitarian activism ==
In 1820 Blatchley helped organize the New York Society for Promoting Communities to advance cooperative Christian commonwealths that would abolish private landholding and share labor and goods in common. The society's major publication, An Essay on Common Wealths (1822), drew from Robert Owen’s A New View of Society and urged congregations to re-form on cooperative principles under Gospel discipline.

Blatchley sent the pamphlet to Thomas Jefferson, who replied from Monticello on October 21, 1822, praising its philanthropy while doubting that communal property could scale to a large nation and instead advocating the diffusion of education. The letter, preserved by Blatchley, was later shared with Robert Owen during Owen's 1824 American tour. Although the society did not found a lasting settlement, historians credit its writings with anticipating elements of later communitarian and labor movements in the United States.

== Political and labor reform ==
By the late 1820s Blatchley supported the Working Men's Party in New York City and wrote for the Working Man's Advocate, linking communitarian ideals to contemporary labor and anti-Masonic critiques of elite power. Contemporary reports place him on a Working Men's ticket for the state assembly in 1829, though he was not elected. He is also recorded as secretary to a New York-state Anti-Masonic committee around 1830.

== Correspondence with Jefferson and Madison ==
Blatchley entered into polite exchanges with national statesmen. In May 1815 he wrote to James Madison, enclosing a pacifist tract and proposing educational remedies for postwar society; the letter survives in the National Archives. His 1822 correspondence with Thomas Jefferson (noted above) offers a concise contemporary assessment of the prospects and limits of American communitarianism.

== Early printed critique of Mormonism ==
Late in 1829 Blatchley corresponded with Oliver Cowdery and Martin Harris about the forthcoming “Gold Bible.” Cowdery's reply of November 9, 1829, published in Gospel Luminary (Dec. 10, 1829), explained why Joseph Smith could appear as “author” for legal purposes while believers maintained he was merely the divinely guided translator.

On February 20, 1830, weeks before the organization of the church, Blatchley's article “Caution Against the Golden Bible” appeared in the New-York Telescope, highlighting repetitive phrasing and grammatical errors in sample pages and warning readers about the new sect. Modern editors of the Joseph Smith Papers note the piece as an early public challenge to Smith's claims during the book's production and copyright period.

== Death and legacy ==
Blatchley died in New York City on December 5, 1831, aged 58; his death notice ran in the New-York Spectator on December 13. He left no known children. His pamphlets, especially Some Causes of Popular Poverty (1817) and An Essay on Common Wealths (1822), have been discussed by historians of early American socialism and labor democracy for anticipating later Owenite and religious-communitarian experiments in the 1830s–1840s.

== Sources ==
- Erreygers, Guido, ed. (2004). ""Cornelius Camden Blatchly"". The Origins of Universal Grants. Palgrave Macmillan. pp. 17–22. doi:10.1057/9780230522824_2.
- Hugins, Walter (1960). Jacksonian Democracy and the Working Class: The New York Workingmen's Movement, 1829–1831. Stanford University Press.
- "Thomas Jefferson to Cornelius Camden Blatchly, 21 October 1822". Founders Online, National Archives.
- "Cornelius C. Blatchly to Thomas Jefferson, 6 October 1822". Founders Online, National Archives.
- "To James Madison from Cornelius C. Blatchly, 6 May 1815". Founders Online, National Archives.
- "Oliver Cowdery to Cornelius C. Blatchley, 9 Nov. 1829 (published 10 Dec. 1829)". FAIR Latter-day Saints.
- "Caution Against the Golden Bible (Feb. 20, 1830)". Book of Mormon Online.
- "Documents, Vol. 1, Part 2: Introduction (April 1829–March 1830)". The Joseph Smith Papers.
- Hinshaw, William Wade (1936). Encyclopedia of American Quaker Genealogy, Vol. III (New York & New Jersey). Edwards Brothers. p. 37.
