= Thomas Blatchley =

English-born Connecticut merchant and farmer (1615–1674)

- Born: c. 1615; England
- Died: 1674 (aged 58–59); Boston, Massachusetts Bay Colony, English America
- Other names: Blachley, Blakesley, Blackley
- Occupations: Merchant; farmer
- Known for: Early settler of Hartford, Connecticut, participant in the Pequot War, signer of the Newark covenant
- Spouse: Susannah Ball (m. 1643)
- Children: 4

Thomas Blatchley (c. 1615–1674), also spelled Blachley or Blakesley, was an English-born Connecticut merchant and farmer. He is counted among the founding settlers of Hartford, Connecticut, served in the Pequot War in 1637, helped establish Branford, Connecticut in the New Haven Colony, and joined Branford signers who framed the covenant for Newark, New Jersey in 1665. He married Susannah Ball, and their descendants such as the Ball Brothers and Cornelius Blatchley later went on to shape American history.

== Early life and origins ==
Thomas was born about 1615. Later American records imply an age near twenty at emigration. Early historians noted variant surname forms including Blachly, Blackley, and Blakesley, and suggested geographic surname origins such as Blakesley in Northamptonshire or Blackley in Lancashire.

== Emigration to New England ==
Thomas Blatchley, about age 20, came as a passenger on the Hopewell from London on 28 July 1635 under Master Thomas Babb. Historians commonly identify him with the later Hartford and Branford settler. By 1637 Blatchley is documented in Connecticut, consistent with a mid 1630s voyage and subsequent movement to the Connecticut River settlements.

== Founding of Hartford ==
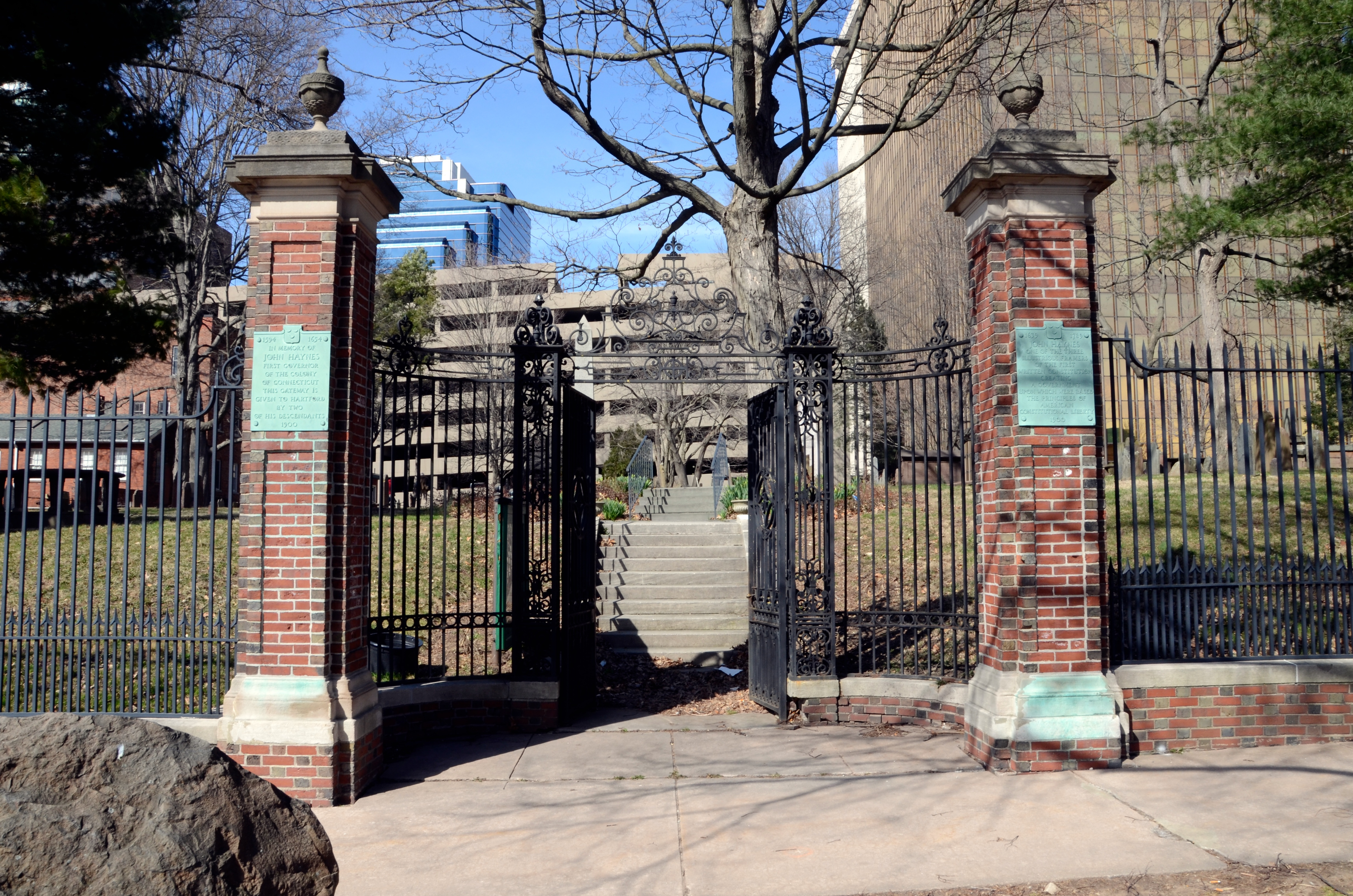
Gateway to Hartford's Ancient Burying Ground.

By 1637 Blatchley was in Hartford and served as a soldier in the Pequot War. Around 7 January 1639 he was granted 12 acres in Hartford on the east side of the Connecticut River, later East Hartford, with an additional two acres of swamp land. He later sold the river parcel to another settler Thomas Burnham. He is honored on the Hartford Founders Monument in the Ancient Burying Ground and is listed by the Society of the Descendants of the Founders of Hartford among proprietors before February 1639 to 1640.

== New Haven Colony and Branford ==
By 1644 Blatchley had moved to New Haven in the New Haven Colony, where on 1 July 1644 he took the Oath of Fidelity and Support. On 6 October 1646 he apologized to the court after an incident of disrespect toward the magistrates, which the court accepted. In 1644 to 1645 he joined the group establishing Totoket, soon called Branford, and is counted among that town's founders. During his Branford years he farmed and engaged in coastwise trade, and his name appears in colony and town records through the 1650s.

== Newark covenant and later years ==
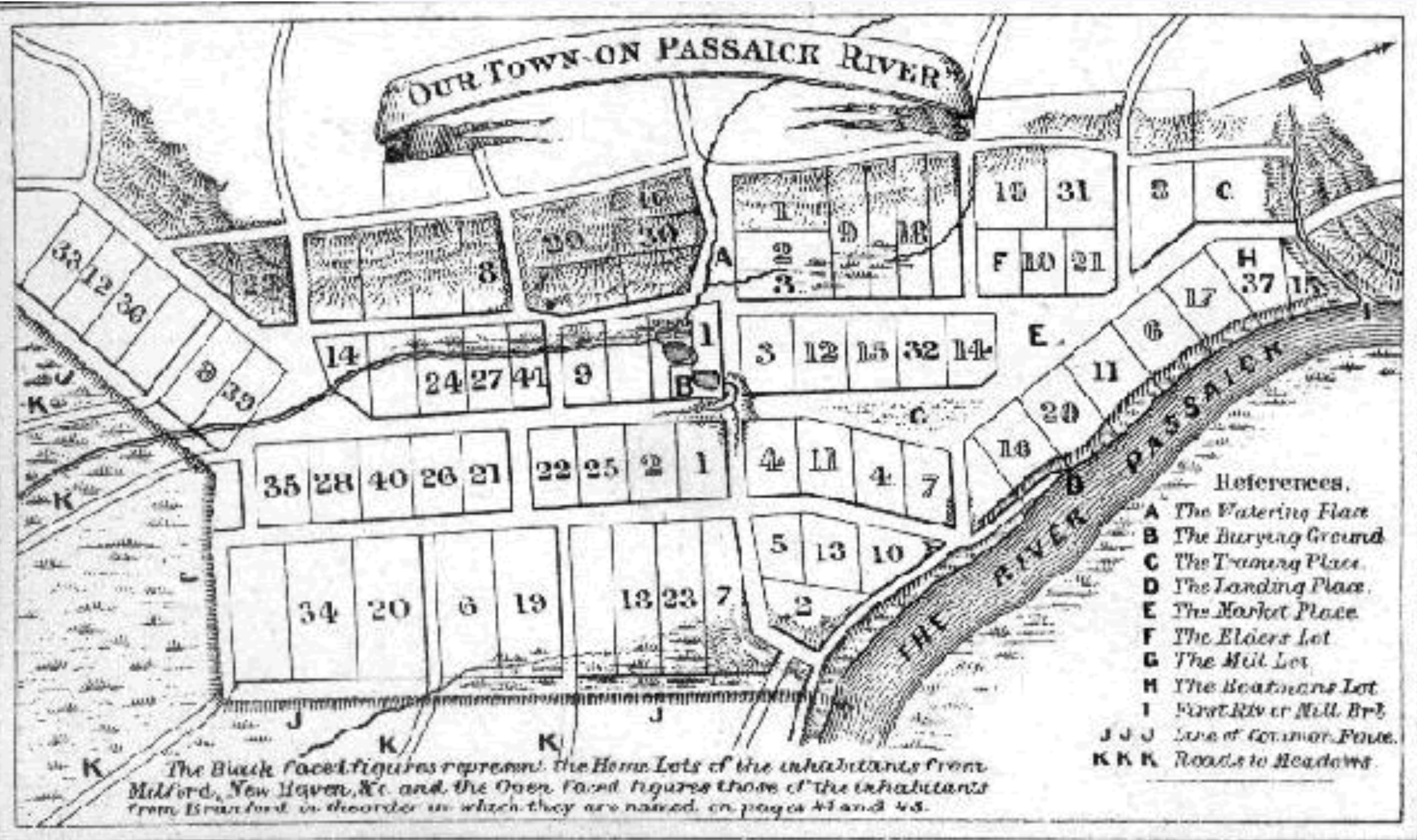
Map of the early settlement of Newark, circa 1666, reflecting the Branford and New Haven migration that Blatchley helped organize.

After the union of New Haven with Connecticut Colony in 1664, many residents of Branford prepared a new settlement in New Jersey. On 30 October 1665 Blatchley and his eldest son Aaron signed the initial covenant for what became Newark, and he served on a committee to organize the plantation. Although he encouraged the enterprise, Blatchley remained in Connecticut. He signed a renewed Branford church covenant on 20 June 1667 and soon after was admitted an inhabitant at Guilford on 23 April 1668, if he could provide himself a place to dwell.

In May 1670 the Connecticut General Court granted him sixty acres in consideration of Pequot War service. Later notices describe him as a man of influence who was evidently a merchant in his later years.

Thomas Blatchley died at Boston in 1674. His estate in Connecticut was valued at £79, and his Boston inventory was valued at £128.

== Marriage and children ==
On 5 June 1643 at New Haven, Thomas Blachley married Susannah, commonly called Susannah Ball of the New Haven Ball family. She later married Richard Bristow on 1 April 1675 at Boston and died there on 16 December 1677.

During their marriage, Susannah bore four children: Aaron (1644 to 1699), Abigail (1648 to after 1690), Moses (1650 to October 1674), and Miriam (1 May 1653 to 1684). Aaron was an original signer of the Newark covenant and lived at Guilford and Newark; Abigail married her cousin Edward Ball; and Miriam married Samuel Pond, whose parents had arrived in the America's on the Arbella as part of the expedition led by John Winthrop.

== Legacy ==
Thomas Blatchley is remembered as a founding era settler whose life touched several colonies. He is named on the Hartford Founders Monument, appears in New Haven and Branford town and church records, and is counted among the Branford signers who framed the Newark covenant. His 1637 service is placed within the broader conflict by modern studies of the Pequot War. Thomas and Susannahs descendants such as Cornelius Blatchley and the Ball Brothers, went on to be influential and help shape America.
