= Thomas Branagan =

Irish-born American writer and abolitionist

Thomas Branagan (born 1774; died 1843) was an American writer and abolitionist. He is known for his works of literature, particularly Avenia, and for his opposition to slavery. He was described by English professor Christopher N. Philipps as a "kind of American counterpart to John Newton." In 1953, he was described by Lewis Leary in The Pennsylvania Magazine of History and Biography as "one of America's most prolific authors during the first two decades of the nineteenth century."

== Life and work ==
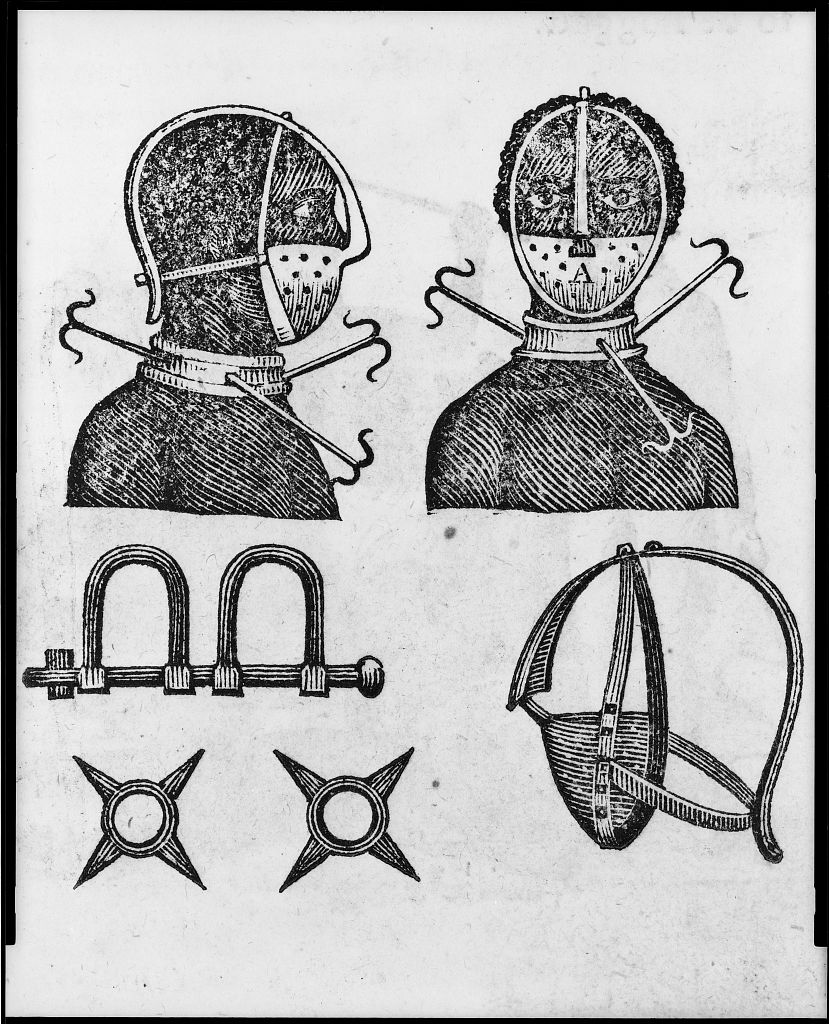
Illustration from The Penitential Tyrant

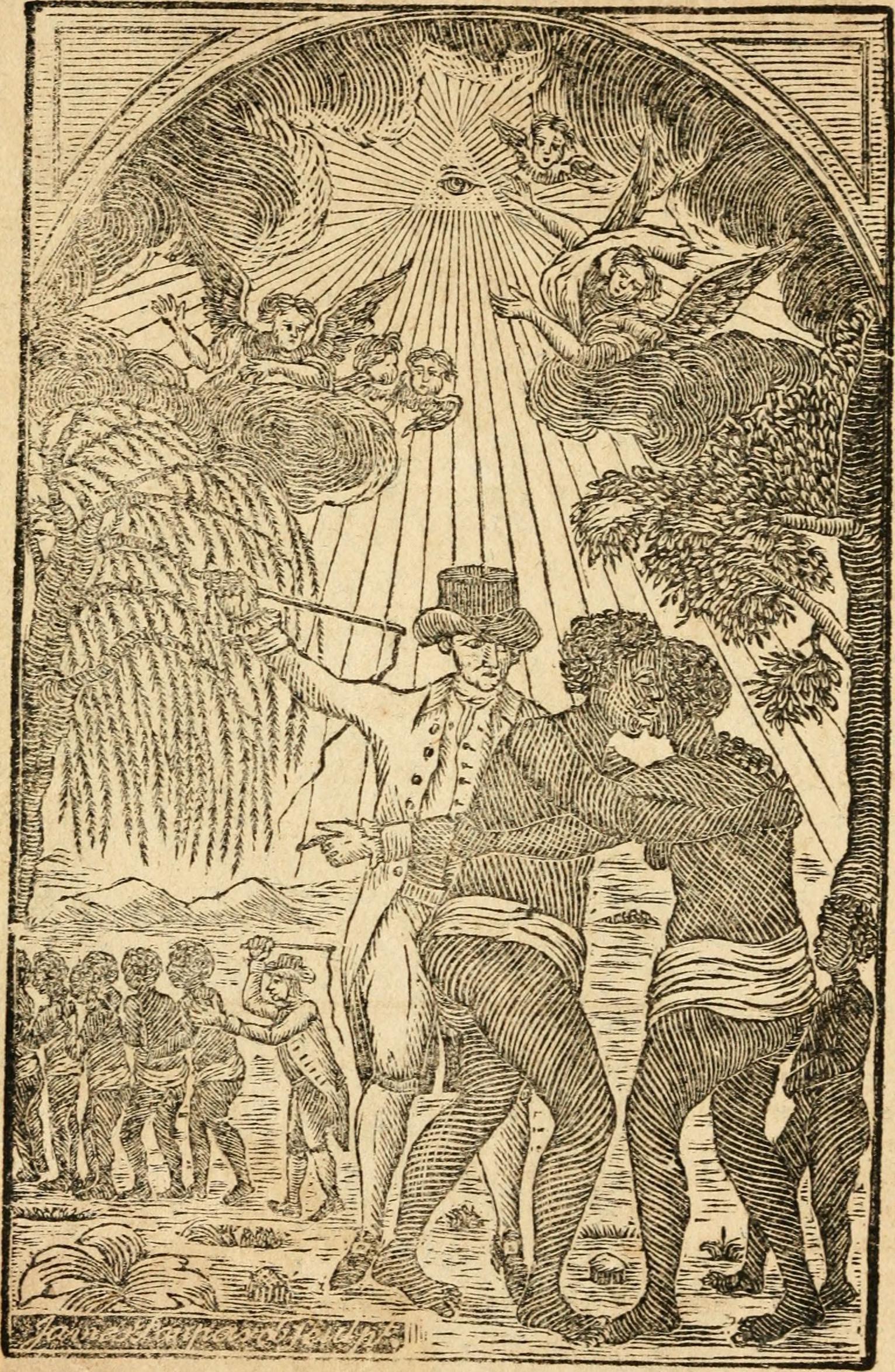
Illustraion from A preliminary essay on the oppression of the exiled sons of Africa

Branagan was born in 1774 in Dublin. During his adolescence, he ran away from home to pursue a career as a sailor. Working on slave ships, he progressed through the ranks and eventually became the overseer of a sugar slave plantation located in Antigua. After converting to Methodism, he became morally opposed to slavery and decided to leave his position to become a preacher. In about 1798, he immigrated to Philadelphia.

Branagan wrote extensively on the topic of the evil of slavery, producing six works on the subject from 1804 to 1810. Four of these works were volumes of poetry. Avenia, which he published in 1805, was the "first poem of any considerable length" published in America on the subject of the enslavement of African Americans. In or around 1807, he argued that a black settlement should be created in the Louisiana Purchase territories, which would promote emancipation of slaves while "saving white society" from dangers he believed would occur in a biracial society. In total, Branagan published 25 works between 1804 and 1839. Later in his life, he worked as a watchman. He sent several of his works to American president Thomas Jefferson.

Branagan’s 1817 book, Pleasures of Contemplation, functioned as a meditation on divine order, nature, and moral relativism and included a fifty page appendix essay titled Some Causes of Popular Poverty, authored by New York Quaker physician Dr. Cornelius Camden Blatchley. Branagan introduced the essay with praise, calling Blatchley’s remarks “ingenious and benevolent,” and explained that what had started as a private letter evolved into the published essay due to its compelling moral urgency.
