= Forestville Commonwealth =

- U.S. National Register of Historic Places
- U.S. Historic district
- Nearest city: Earlton, New York
- Area: 200 acres (81 ha)
- Built: 1826
- NRHP reference No.: 74001242
- Added to NRHP: November 20, 1974

Forestville Commonwealth is an archaeological site and national historic district located at Earlton in Greene County, New York. The district contains seven contributing sites. It represents the remains of a utopian community built in 1826-1827 as one of three Owenite experiments in New York State.

It was listed on the National Register of Historic Places in 1974.
