= Abram Combe =

British utopian socialist (1785–1827)

Abram Combe (15 January 1785 – 11 August 1827) was a British utopian socialist, an associate of Robert Owen and a major figure in the early co-operative movement, leading one of the earliest Owenite communities, at Orbiston, Scotland.

== Life ==
=== Early years ===
Combe was born in Edinburgh on 15 January 1785, son of George Combe, a brewer and strict Calvinist. He attended Edinburgh High School but, unlike his brothers George and Andrew, he preferred practical pursuits to academic ones and became apprenticed to a local tanner. After his apprenticeship Combe worked as a currier in London and Glasgow, before returning to Edinburgh in 1807 to set up his own tannery business. He married Agnes Dawson in 1812 and started a family.

Combe was a hard-working and successful businessman, motivated by self-interest but honourable in his dealings with others. He strongly believed that every man was responsible for his own character and was scathing in his criticism of anyone whose standards of behaviour differed from his own. Such criticisms were often expressed satirically in verse and prose.

=== Owenism and Divine Revelation ===
In 1820, Combe met Robert Owen during a visit to his mill at New Lanark and was impressed by Owen's views on the formation of character, the defects in the principles and practices of society and the virtues of co-operation and universal benevolence. Following a period of reflection and study Combe radically altered his former views and habits. He ceased to be motivated by self-interest and where once he had criticised other people's weaknesses he now showed compassion. He even abandoned some of the social activities that he had previously enjoyed, such as eating meat, drinking alcohol and going to the theatre.

In 1821 Combe put his Owenism into practice by becoming a founder-member of the Edinburgh Practical Society, an Owenite group which opened its own co-operative store and founded its own school. Although the Society claimed 500 members, it fizzled out within a year. Combe then tried to set up a co-operative with his own employees at his tanyard, but this too was short-lived.

Combe continued to proselytise on Owen's behalf by writing pamphlets and books. These included Metaphorical Sketches of the Old and New Systems (1823), in which he satirically attacked the prevailing capitalist economic theories by comparing the British economy to a cistern, which was capable of supplying the wants of the entire nation until the guardians of the stopcock cut off supply. He also attempted to defend Owen's religious views. Owen had scandalised large sections of society by attacking all forms of organised religion and was widely believed to be an atheist and infidel. Combe went to great lengths to present Owen's ideas as prophetic truths, wholly consistent with the laws of nature, which, he argued, were the laws of God. He referred to these beliefs as "Divine Revelation", which he explained as "the facts and truths which the Great Governing Power of the Universe reveals to the senses and understanding".

=== Orbiston ===
During the early 1820s Owen had been trying to raise funds to set up a co-operative community in Lanarkshire, Scotland. One of his supporters was Archibald James Hamilton, whose father owned a large estate near Motherwell. On his father's behalf, Hamilton had sold part of the estate to Owen, but after much delay Owen abandoned the project and went to America to set up a community at New Harmony, Indiana. Hamilton had known Combe since the days of the Edinburgh Practical Society and together they decided to set up a community without Owen's help. They and others formed a joint-stock company to finance the operation, Hamilton bought back the land from Owen and sold a smaller part of it, at Orbiston, near Motherwell, to the company.

Building works to house the new community commenced in March 1825, but it was several months before any tenants could be admitted. In the early days, Combe and Hamilton were assisted by George Mudie, who had founded the Owenite community at Spa Fields. Mudie and Combe, however, could not work together and Mudie soon left after warning Hamilton that Combe lacked the management skills to lead the community.

Although building work was far from complete, the first tenants were admitted in October 1825. The community got off to a controversial start when Combe insisted that it be known as The First Society of Adherents to Divine Revelation. Many of the members objected but as Combe had been accepted as their leader his will prevailed. In order to chronicle the progress of the community he edited a weekly newspaper, The Register for the First Society of Adherents to Divine Revelation at Orbiston. In spite of Combe's protestations of religious orthodoxy, the community was viewed with suspicion by local church ministers and their congregations. The situation was not helped by the unruly behaviour of the building workers, Orbiston became known locally as "Babylon" and some newsagents refused to stock The Register.

Nevertheless, the community continued to grow and by the summer of 1826 it consisted of around 250 members, while its commercial activities included an iron foundry, a printing press, a dairy, a grain mill and several building trades. Orbiston was visited by several English co-operators who were keen to see its progress. One visitor was the economic writer John Gray, who published an address of advice and criticism of Combe's experiment: A Word of Advice to the Orbistonians, on the Principles Which Ought to Regulate their Present Proceedings (1826). Like George Mudie before him, Gray was alarmed by the lack of any management plan for the community. Combe had accepted all applicants for membership, without regard for what type of work they were capable of undertaking. As a result, Gray thought, the community was failing to perform the tasks necessary for its survival. While Gray was fulsome in his praise of Combe as a person he said that he was "too little of a theorist... his mind was very prematurely devoted to practical measures." Other visitors made similar criticisms, but Combe was not convinced that the survival of community was at risk.

=== Illness and death ===
Combe's health began to fail in 1826. In addition to editing The Register and addressing numerous meetings, he had spent many hours helping to dig trenches. By mid-1826 he was coughing up blood and having trouble breathing. His doctor in Edinburgh told him that his lungs were inflamed and that he should cease all strenuous activity. After a two-week convalescence Combe seemed to recover and he returned to Orbiston. However, in August 1826 he had another attack, which left him too weak to continue leading the community. He gave up editing The Register and left Orbiston to live in Edinburgh. Combe remained the community's president and talisman. He gave advice through letters to The Register, but played no part in its day-to-day activities and was unable to resolve the internal disputes which were dividing the community. Combe died on 11 August 1827 and by the end of that year the community had been shut down.

== Combe in print ==
- An Address to the Conductors of the Periodical Press, on the Causes of Religious and Political Disputes (1823)
- Observations on the Old and New Views (1823)
- Metaphorical Sketches of the Old and New Systems (1823)
- The Religious Creed of the New System (1824)
- The Sphere for Joint-Stock Companies (1825)
- The New Court (1825)
- The Register for the First Society of Adherents to Divine Revelation at Orbiston (weekly journal edited by Combe from 10 November 1825 to 9 September 1826)

== Sources ==
- Cullen, Alexander, Adventures in Socialism (Glasgow, 1910)
- Garnett, R. G., Co-operation and the Owenite Communities in Britain, 1825 – 1845 (Manchester University Press, 1972)
- Gray, J., The Social System: A Treatise on the Principle of Exchange. London, 1831. Appendix.
- Harrison, J. F. C., Robert Owen and the Owenites in Britain and America (Routledge and Kegan Paul, 1969)
- Seligman, E.R.A., 'Owen and the Christian Socialists.' Political Science Quarterly Vol. 1, No. 2 (Jun., 1886), pp. 206–249.
