= Robert Owen =

Welsh social reformer (1771–1858)

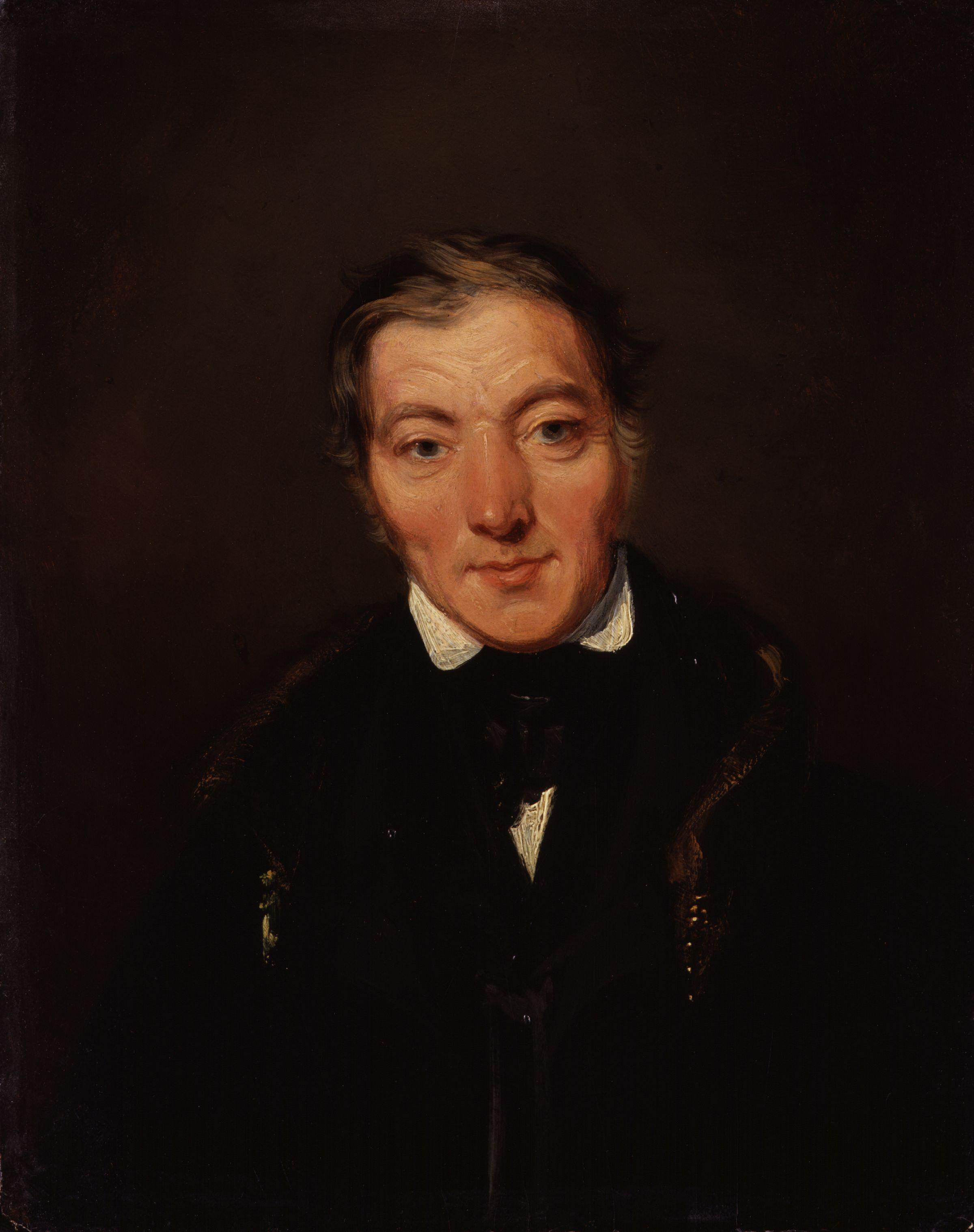
- Portrait by William Henry Brooke, 1834
- Born: 14 May 1771; Newtown, Montgomeryshire, Wales
- Died: 17 November 1858 (aged 87); Newtown, Montgomeryshire, Wales
- Occupations: Co-operator; social reformer; textile mill co-owner; philanthropic capitalist
- Spouse: Ann (or Anne) Caroline Dale (m. 1799, died)
- Children: 8, including Robert, David and Richard

Robert Owen (/ˈoʊɪn/; 14 May 1771 – 17 November 1858) was a Welsh textile manufacturer, philanthropist, political philosopher and social reformer, and a founder of utopian socialism and the co-operative movement. He strove to improve factory working conditions, promoted experimental socialistic communities, sought a more collective approach to child-rearing, and 'believed in lifelong education, establishing an Institute for the Formation of Character and School for Children that focused less on job skills than on becoming a better person'.

Having trained as a draper in Stamford, Lincolnshire, Owen worked in London before relocating at age 18 to Manchester and textile manufacturing. He gained wealth in the early 1800s from a textile mill at New Lanark, Scotland. In 1824, he moved to America and put most of his fortune in an experimental socialistic community at New Harmony, Indiana, as a preliminary for his utopian society. It lasted about two years. Other Owenite communities also did not last long term, and in 1828 Owen returned to London, where he continued to champion the working class, develop co-operatives and trade unions, and support child labour legislation and free co-educational schools.

== Biography ==
=== Early life and family ===
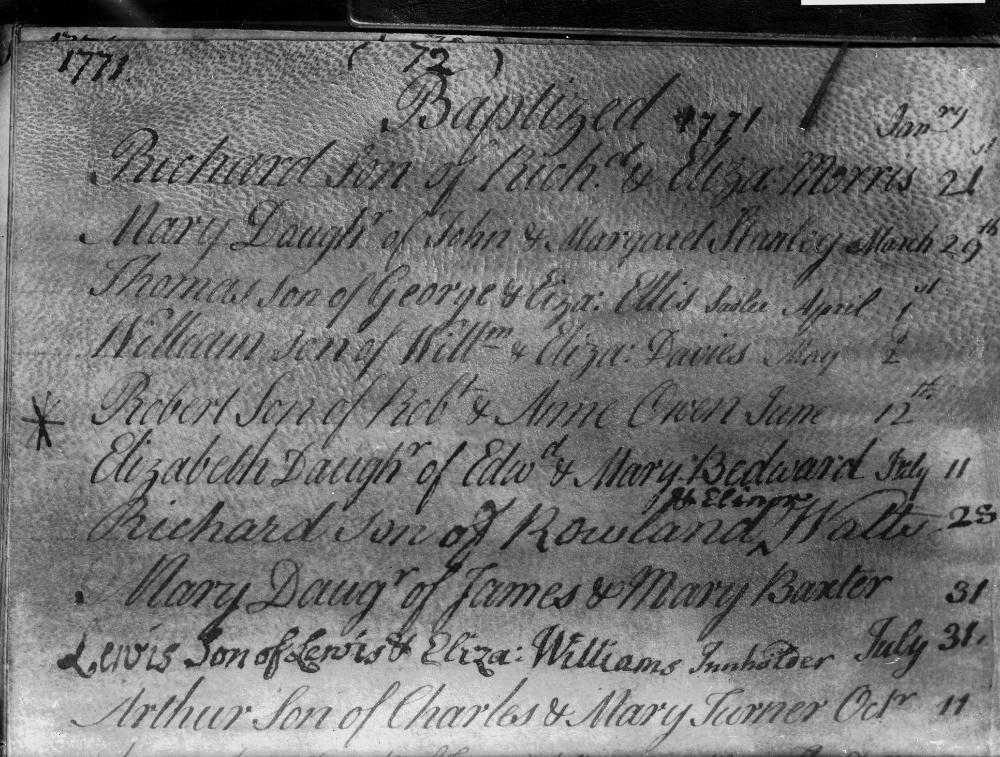
Baptism record of Owen in the Newtown Anglican Parish Register

Robert Owen was born in Newtown, a small market town in Montgomeryshire, Wales, on 14 May 1771, to Anne (Williams) and Robert Owen. His father was a saddler, ironmonger and local postmaster; his mother was the daughter of a Newtown farming family. Young Robert was the sixth of the family's seven children, two of whom died at a young age. His surviving siblings were William, Anne, John and Richard.

Owen received little formal education, but he was an avid reader. He left school at the age of ten to be an apprentice draper in Stamford for four years. He also worked in London drapery shops in his teenage years. At about the age of 18, Owen moved to Manchester, where he spent the next twelve years of his life, employed initially at Satterfield's Drapery in Saint Ann's Square.

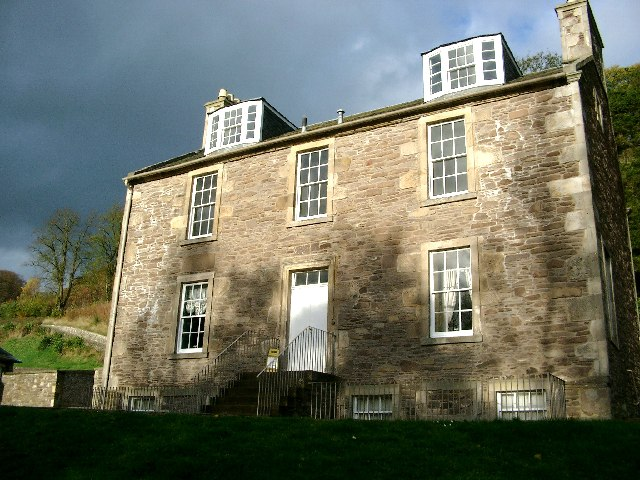
Robert Owen's house in New Lanark, Scotland.

On a visit to Scotland, Owen met and fell in love with Ann (or Anne) Caroline Dale, daughter of David Dale, a Glasgow philanthropist and the proprietor of the large New Lanark Mills. After their marriage on 30 September 1799, the Owens set up a home in New Lanark, but later moved to Braxfield House in Lanark.

Robert and Caroline Owen had eight children, the first of whom died in infancy. Their seven survivors were four sons and three daughters: Robert Dale (1801–1877), William (1802–1842), Ann (or Anne) Caroline (1805–1831), Jane Dale (1805–1861), David Dale (1807–1860), Richard Dale (1809–1890) and Mary (1810–1832). Owen's four sons, Robert Dale, William, David Dale and Richard, and his daughter Jane Dale, followed their father to the United States, becoming US citizens and permanent residents in New Harmony, Indiana. Owen's wife Caroline and two of their daughters, Anne Caroline and Mary, remained in Britain, where they died in the 1830s.

=== Textile mills ===
While in Manchester, Owen borrowed £100 from his brother William, to enter into a partnership to make spinning mules, a new invention for spinning cotton threads, but exchanged his business shares within a few months for six spinning mules that he worked in rented factory space. In 1792, when Owen was about 21 years old, mill-owner Peter Drinkwater made him manager of the Piccadilly Mill at Manchester. However, after two years with Drinkwater, Owen voluntarily gave up his contract of partnership and left the company, and went into partnership with other entrepreneurs to establish and later manage the Chorlton Twist Mills in Chorlton-on-Medlock.

By the early 1790s, Owen's entrepreneurial spirit and management skills and progressive moral views were emerging. In 1793, he was elected as a member of the Manchester Literary and Philosophical Society, where the ideas of the Enlightenment were discussed. He also became a committee member of the Manchester Board of Health, instigated principally by Thomas Percival to press for improvements in the health and working conditions of factory workers.

In July 1799 Owen and his partners bought the New Lanark mill from David Dale, and Owen became its manager in January 1800. Encouraged by his management success in Manchester, Owen hoped to conduct the New Lanark mill on higher principles than purely commercial ones. It had been established in 1785 by David Dale and Richard Arkwright. Water power provided by the falls of the River Clyde turned its cotton-spinning operation into one of Britain's largest. About 2,000 individuals were involved, 500 of them children, brought to the mill at the age of five or six from the poorhouses and charities of Edinburgh and Glasgow. Dale, known for his benevolence, treated the children well, but the general condition of New Lanark residents was unsatisfactory, despite efforts by Dale and his son-in-law Owen to improve their workers' lives.

Many of the workers were from the lowest social levels: theft, drunkenness and other vices were common and education and sanitation neglected. Most families lived in one room. More respectable people rejected the long hours and demoralising drudgery of the mills.

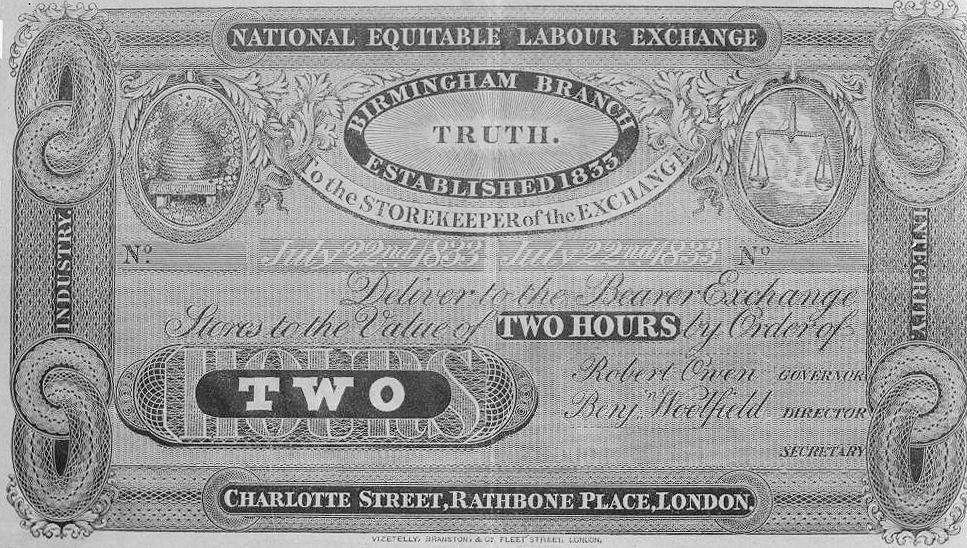
Truck system of payment by order of Robert Owen and Benj Woolfield, National Equitable Labour Exchange, 22 July 1833.

Until a series of Truck Acts (1831–1887) required employers to pay their employees in common currency, many operated a truck system, paying workers wholly or in part with tokens that had no monetary value outside the mill owner's "truck shop", which charged high prices for shoddy goods. Unlike others, Owen's truck store offered goods at prices only slightly above their wholesale cost, passing on the savings from bulk purchases to his customers and placing alcohol sales under strict supervision. These principles became the basis for Britain's co-operative shops, some of which continue trading in altered forms to this day.

=== American communal living experiments ===
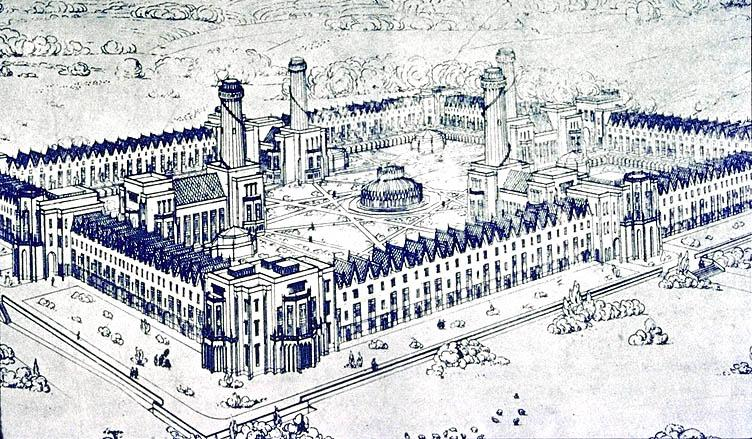
New Moral World, Owen's envisioned successor of New Harmony. Owenites fired bricks to build it, but it was never constructed.

To test the viability of his ideas for self-sufficient working communities, Owen began experimenting with communal living in the United States in 1825. Among the most famous efforts was the one set up at New Harmony, Indiana. Of the 130 identifiable communitarian experiments in the United States before the American Civil War, at least 16 were Owenite or Owenite-influenced. New Harmony was Owen's earliest and most ambitious of these.

Owen and his son William sailed to the United States in October 1824 to establish an experimental community in Indiana. In January 1825 Owen used a portion of his funds to purchase an existing town of 180 buildings and several thousand acres of land along the Wabash River in Indiana. George Rapp's Harmony Society, the religious group that owned the property and that had founded the communal village of Harmony (or Harmonie) on the site in 1814, decided in 1824 to relocate to Pennsylvania. Owen renamed it New Harmony and made the village his preliminary model for a Utopian community. During Owen’s 1824 American tour, New York activist and columnist Cornelius Blatchley shared with him Thomas Jefferson’s 1822 reply to Blatchley’s communitarian pamphlet, illustrating early transatlantic exchange between American and Owenite cooperative ideas.

Owen sought support for his socialist vision among American thinkers, reformers, intellectuals and public statesmen. On 25 February and 7 March 1825, Owen gave addresses to the House of Representatives in Congress and to others in the US government, outlining his vision for the Utopian community at New Harmony, and his socialist beliefs. The audience for his ideas included three former U.S. presidents – John Adams, Thomas Jefferson, and James Madison – the outgoing US President James Monroe, and the President-elect, John Quincy Adams. His meetings were perhaps the first discussions of socialism in the Americas; they were certainly a big step towards discussion of it in the United States. Owenism, among the first socialist ideologies active in the United States, can be seen as an instigator of the later socialist movement.

Owen convinced William Maclure, a wealthy Scottish scientist and philanthropist living in Philadelphia to join him at New Harmony and become his financial partner. Maclure's involvement went on to attract scientists, educators and artists such as Thomas Say, Charles-Alexandre Lesueur, and Madame Marie Duclos Fretageot. These helped to turn the New Harmony community into a centre for educational reform, scientific research and artistic expression.

Although Owen sought to build a "Village of Unity and Mutual Cooperation" south of the town, his grand plan was never fully realised and he returned to Britain to continue his work. During his long absences from New Harmony, Owen left the experiment under the day-to-day management of his sons, Robert Dale Owen and William Owen, and his business partner, Maclure. However, New Harmony proved to be an economic failure, lasting about two years, although it had attracted over a thousand residents by the end of its first year. The socialistic society was dissolved in 1827, but many of its scientists, educators, artists and other inhabitants, including Owen's four sons, Robert Dale, William, David Dale, and Richard Dale Owen, and his daughter Jane Dale Owen Fauntleroy, remained at New Harmony after the experiment ended.

Other experiments in the United States included communal settlements at Blue Spring, near Bloomington, Indiana, at Yellow Springs, Ohio, and at Forestville Commonwealth at Earlton, New York, as well as other projects in New York, Pennsylvania, and Tennessee. Nearly all of these had ended before New Harmony was dissolved in April 1827.

Owen's Utopian communities attracted a mix of people, many with the highest aims. They included vagrants, adventurers and other reform-minded enthusiasts. In the words of Owen's son David Dale Owen, they attracted "a heterogeneous collection of Radicals", "enthusiastic devotees to principle", and "honest latitudinarians, and lazy theorists", with "a sprinkling of unprincipled sharpers thrown in".

Josiah Warren, a participant at New Harmony, asserted that it was doomed to failure for lack of individual sovereignty and personal property. In describing the community, Warren explained: "We had a world in miniature – we had enacted the French revolution over again with despairing hearts instead of corpses as a result ... It appeared that it was nature's inherent law of diversity that had conquered us ... our 'united interests' were directly at war with the individualities of persons and circumstances and the instinct of self-preservation". Warren's observations on the reasons for the community's failure led to the development of American individualist anarchism, of which he was its original theorist. Some historians have traced the demise of New Harmony to serial disagreements among its members.

Social experiments also began in Scotland in 1825, when Abram Combe, an Owenite, attempted a utopian experiment at Orbiston, near Glasgow, but this failed after about two years. In the 1830s, additional experiments in socialistic co-operatives were made in Ireland and Britain, the most important being at Ralahine, established in 1831 in County Clare, Ireland, and at Tytherley, begun in 1839 in Hampshire, England. The former proved a remarkable success for three-and-a-half years until the proprietor, having ruined himself by gambling, had to sell his interest. Tytherley, known as Harmony Hall or Queenwood College, was designed by the architect Joseph Hansom. This also failed. Another social experiment, Manea Colony in the Isle of Ely, Cambridgeshire, launched in the late 1830s by William Hodson, likewise an Owenite, but it failed in a couple of years and Hodson emigrated to the United States. The Manea Colony site has been excavated by the Cambridge Archaeology Unit (CAU) based at the University of Cambridge.

=== Return to Great Britain ===
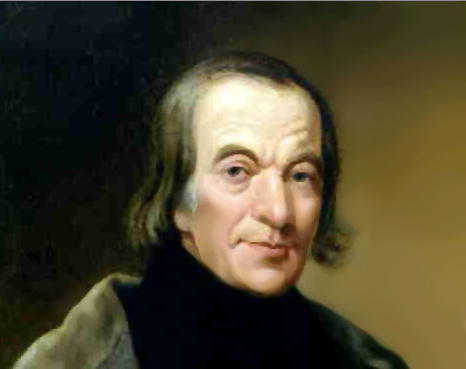
Portrait of Owen by John Cranch, 1845

Although Owen made further brief visits to the United States, London became his permanent home and the centre of his work in 1828. After extended friction with William Allen and some other business partners, Owen relinquished all connections with New Lanark. He is often quoted in a comment by Allen at the time, "All the world is queer save thee and me, and even thou art a little queer". Having invested most of his fortune in the failed New Harmony communal experiment, Owen was no longer a wealthy capitalist. However, he remained the head of a vigorous propaganda effort to promote industrial equality, free education for children and adequate living conditions in factory towns, while delivering lectures in Europe and publishing a weekly newspaper to gain support for his ideas.

In 1832 Owen opened the National Equitable Labour Exchange system, a time-based currency in which the exchange of goods was effected using labour notes; this system superseded the usual means of exchange and middlemen. The London exchange continued until 1833, with a Birmingham branch operating for just a few months until July 1833. Owen also became involved in trade unionism, briefly leading the Grand National Consolidated Trade Union (GNCTU) before its collapse in 1834.

Socialism first became current in British terminology in discussions of the Association of all Classes of all Nations, which Owen formed in 1835 and served as its initial leader. Owen's secular views also gained enough influence among the working classes to cause the Westminster Review to comment in 1839 that his principles were the creed of many of them. However, by 1846, the only lasting result of Owen's agitation for social change, carried on through public meetings, pamphlets, periodicals, and occasional treatises, remained the Co-operative movement, and for a time even that seemed to have collapsed.

As Owen grew older and more radical in his views, his influence began to decline. Owen published his memoirs, The Life of Robert Owen, in 1857, a year before his death.

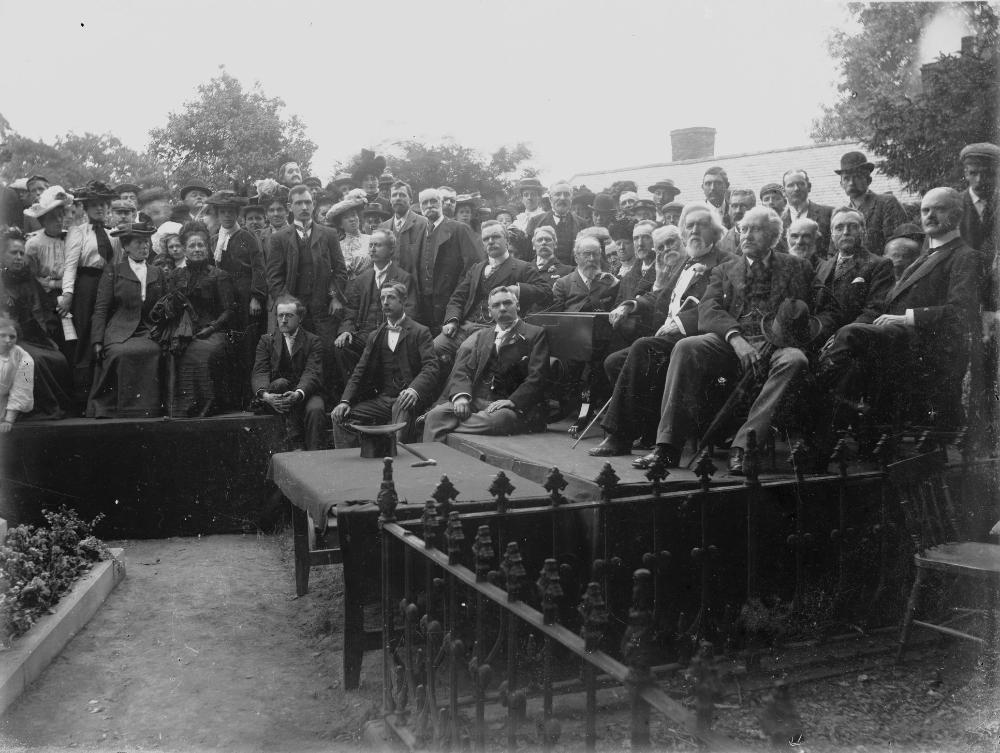
Crowds gathering at Owen's grave in July 1902

Although he had spent most of his life in England and Scotland, Owen returned to his native town of Newtown at the end of his life. He died there on 17 November 1858 and was buried there on 21 November. He died poor apart from an annual income drawn from a trust established by his sons in 1844.

== Philosophy and influence ==
Owen tested his social and economic ideas at New Lanark, where he won his workers' confidence and continued to have success through improved efficiency at the mill. The community also earned an international reputation. Social reformers, statesmen and royalty, including the future Tsar Nicholas I of Russia, visited New Lanark to study its methods. The opinions of many such visitors were favourable.

Some of Owen's schemes displeased his partners, forcing him to arrange for other investors to buy his share of the business in 1813, for the equivalent of US$800,000. The new investors, who included Jeremy Bentham and the well-known Quaker William Allen, were content to accept a £5,000 return on their capital. The ownership change also provided Owen with a chance to broaden his philanthropy, advocating improvements in workers' rights and child labour laws, and free education for children.

Owen felt that human character is formed by conditions over which individuals have no control. Thus individuals could not be praised or blamed for their behaviour or situation in life. This principle led Owen to conclude that the correct formation of people's characters called for placing them under proper environmental influences – physical, moral and social – from their earliest years. These notions of inherent irresponsibility in humans and the effect of early influences on an individual's character formed the basis of Owen's system of education and social reform.

Relying on his observations, experiences and thoughts, Owen saw his view of human nature as original and "the most basic and necessary constituent in an evolving science of society". His philosophy was influenced by Sir Isaac Newton's views on natural law, and his views resembled those of Plato, Denis Diderot, Claude Adrien Helvétius, William Godwin, John Locke, James Mill, and Jeremy Bentham, among others. Owen did not have the direct influence of Enlightenment philosophers.

Owen hoped for a better and more harmonious environment that promoted mutual respect, love and moral values. He believed everyone would have a good education and better living condition to live righteously. He valued social and educational reforms for the middle class and rejected the capitalist power which elevated the powerful figures at the expense of others. Owen funded kids' schools and advocated for free education, equal rights and freedom. He participated in legislation to improve labourers' wages and working conditions.

Owen believed compassion, kindness and solidarity corrected bad habits, encouraged self-discipline and enhanced a person's attitude. Force oppressed people and affected their mental health. In his view, unless people were educated in a proper environment, obtained equal opportunities for jobs and maintained social norms, differences between labour classes, conflicts, and inequalities would persist just as in the British colonies. Without making any changes in the national institutions, he believed that even reorganizing the working classes would bring great benefits. So he opposed the views of radicals seeking to change in the public mentality by expanding voting rights.

=== Education ===
Owen's work at New Lanark continued to have significance in Britain and continental Europe. He was a "pioneer in factory reform, the father of distributive co-operation, and the founder of nursery schools". His schemes for educating his workers included opening an Institute for the Formation of Character at New Lanark in 1818. This and other programmes at New Lanark provided free education from infancy to adulthood. In addition, he zealously supported factory legislation that culminated in the Cotton Mills and Factories Act 1819. Owen also had interviews and communications with leading members of the British government, including its premier, Robert Banks Jenkinson, Lord Liverpool. He also met many of the rulers and leading statesmen of Europe.

Owen's biggest success was in support of youth education and early child care. As a pioneer in Britain, notably Scotland, Owen provided an alternative to the "normal authoritarian approach to child education". Supporters of the methods argued that the manners of children brought up under his system were more graceful, genial and unconstrained; health, plenty and contentment prevailed; drunkenness was almost unknown and illegitimacy extremely rare. Owen's relations with his workers remained excellent and operations at the mill proceeded in a smooth, regular and commercially successful way.

Perhaps one of Robert Owen's most memorable ideas was his silent monitor method. Owen was opposed to common corporal punishment; therefore, to have some form of discipline he developed the "silent monitor". In his mills, he would hang a four-sided block each displaying a different colour representing the behaviour of the employee.

=== Labour ===
Owen adopted new principles to raise the standard of goods his workers produced. A cube with faces painted in different colours was installed above each machinist's workplace. The colour of the face showed to all who saw it the quality and quantity of goods the worker completed. The intention was to encourage workers to do their best. Although it was no great incentive in itself, conditions at New Lanark for workers and their families were idyllic for the time.

Owen raised the demand for an eight-hour day in 1810 and set about instituting the policy at New Lanark. By 1817 he had formulated the goal of an eight-hour working day with the slogan "eight hours labour, eight hours recreation, eight hours rest".

=== Socialism ===
In 1813 Owen authored and published A New View of Society, or Essays on the Principle of the Formation of the Human Character, the first of four essays he wrote to explain the principles behind his philosophy of socialistic reform. In this book he spoke against Malthusian theories, saying each new person could grow food to feed ten people if given the proper opportunity, so capitalist management, not any deep-seated fundamental, was the reason for hunger and misery.

Owen also spoke out for government involvement in the economy, saying

... the present arrangement of society is the most anti-social, impolitic, and irrational that can be devised; that under its influence all the superior and valuable qualities of the human race are repressed from infancy, and that the most unnatural means are used to bring out the most injurious propensities ...

Owen had been a follower of classical liberalism as espoused by utilitarian Jeremy Bentham, who said that free markets and laissez-faire, in particular the right of workers to move and choose their employers, would release workers from the excessive power of capitalists. However, Owen developed his own, pro-socialist outlook.

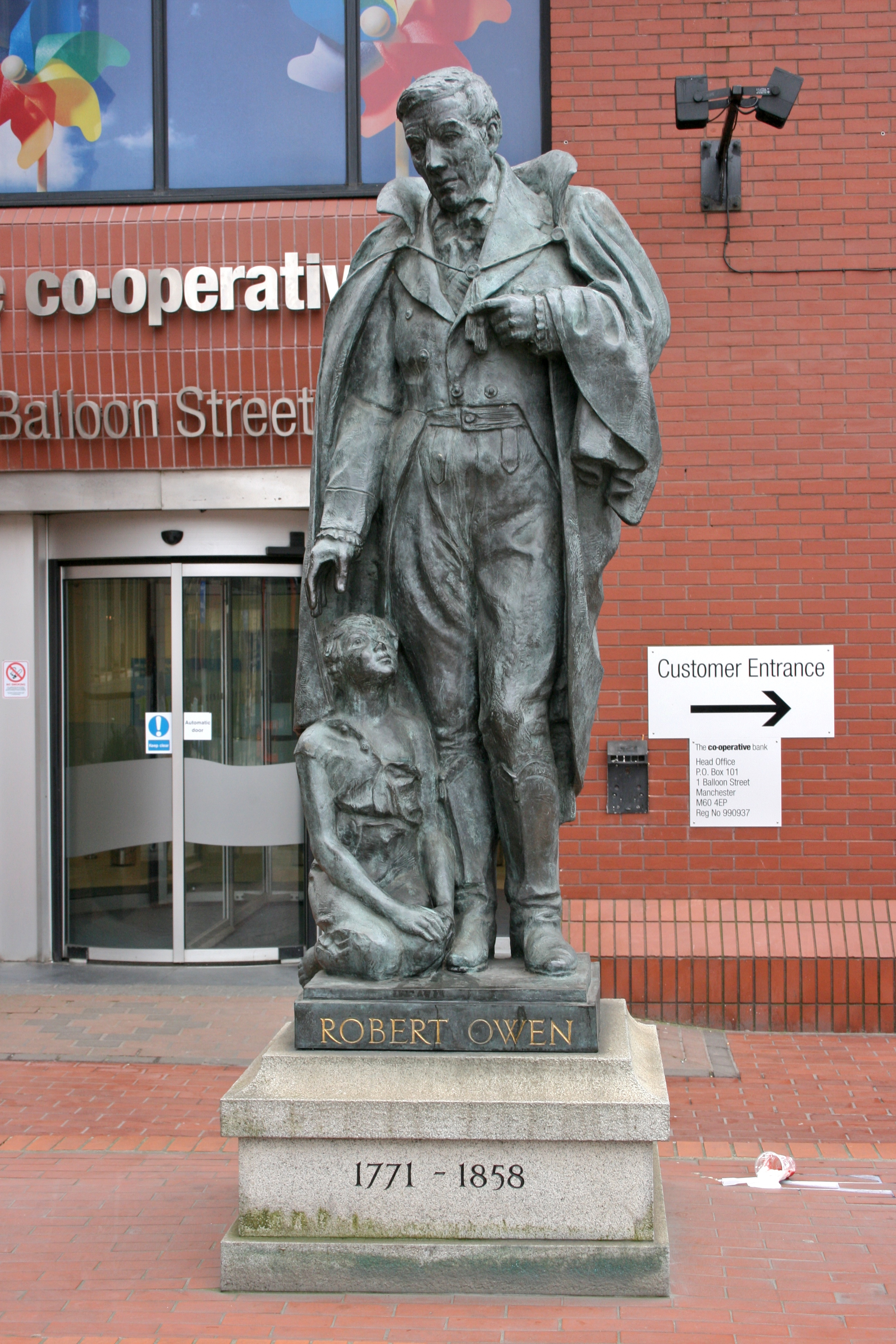
A statue commemorating Owen in Manchester, in front of The Co-operative Bank

Owen embraced socialism in 1817, a turning point in his life. Some of these views had been presented earlier in "A New View of Society". He outlined his position in a report to the committee of the House of Commons on the country's Poor Laws. As widespread misery and trade stagnation drew national attention after the Napoleonic Wars, the government called on Owen for advice on how to alleviate the industrial concerns. Although he ascribed the immediate misery to the wars, he saw it as the underlying cause of competition of human labour with machinery and recommended setting up self-sufficient communities.

Owen appealed to the self-interest of capitalists, pointing out that just as machines need proper care and treatment to guarantee they work smoothly and efficiently, so do humans.

Owen proposed that communities of some 1,200 people should settle on land from 1,000 to 1,500 acres (405 to 607 ha), all living in one building with a public kitchen and dining halls. (The proposed size may have been influenced by the size of the village of New Lanark.) Owen also proposed that each family have its private apartment and the responsibility for the care of its children up to the age of three. Thereafter children would be raised by the community, but their parents would have access to them at mealtimes and on other occasions. Owen further suggested that such communities be established by individuals, parishes, counties, or other governmental units. In each case, there would be effective supervision by qualified persons. Work and enjoyment of its results should be experienced communally. Owen believed his idea would be the best way to reorganise society in general, and called his vision the "New Moral World". His son Robert Dale Owen, then only 23 years of age, reflected on his father's pioneering work in education and co-operative living in the book On the Outline of the System of Education at New Lanark (1824).

Owen's utopian model changed little in his lifetime. His developed model envisaged an association of 500–3,000 people as the optimum for a working community. While mainly agricultural, it would possess the best machinery, offer varied employment, and as far as possible be self-contained. Owen went on to explain that as such communities proliferated, "unions of them federatively united shall be formed in the circle of tens, hundreds and thousands", linked by a common interest.

=== Spiritualism ===
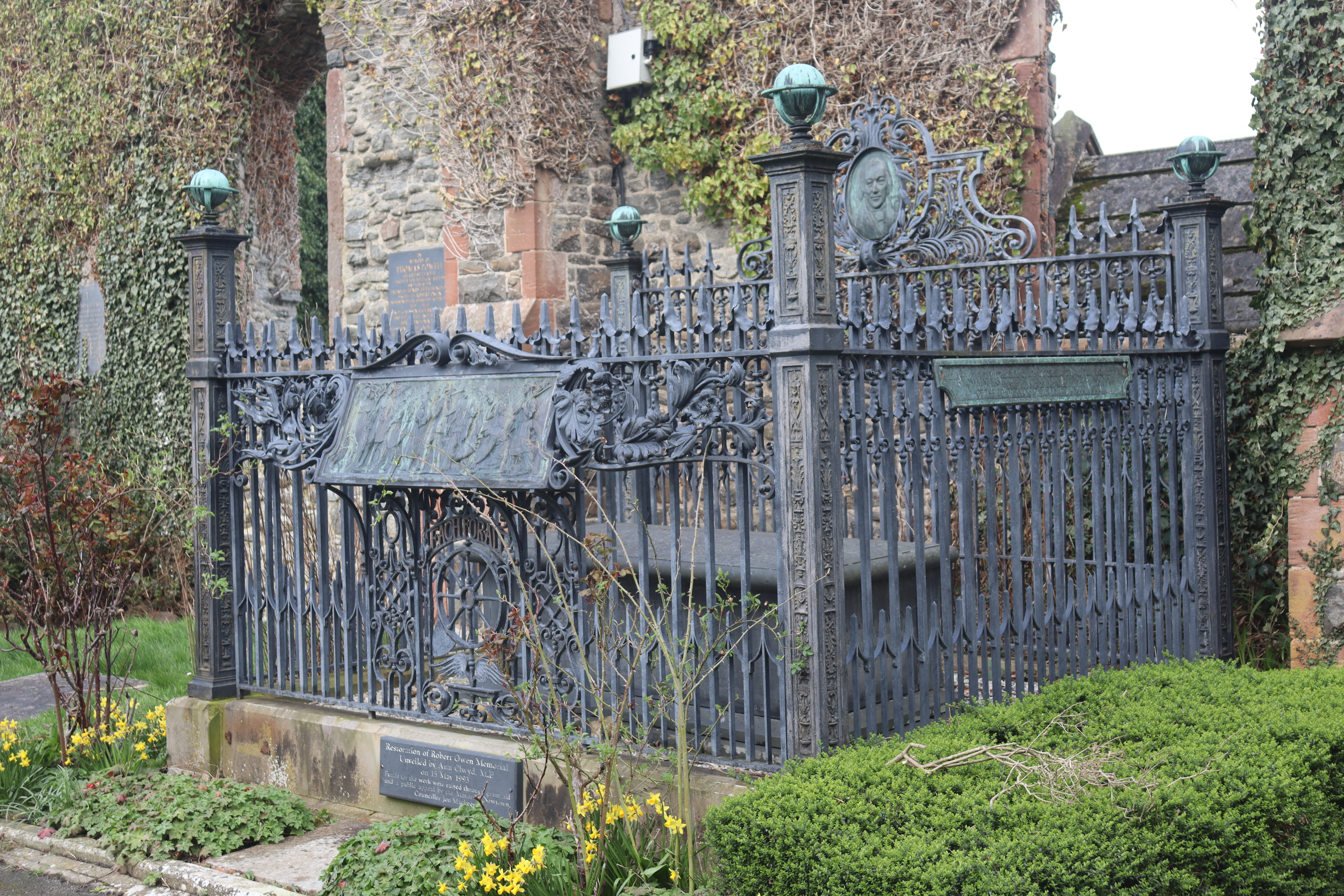
Tomb of Robert Owen, Newtown, Powys. The Art Nouveau railings were a 1902 addition

In 1817, Owen publicly claimed that all religions were false. In 1854, aged 83, Owen converted to spiritualism after a series of sittings with Maria B. Hayden, an American medium credited with introducing spiritualism to England. He made a public profession of his new faith in his publication The Rational Quarterly Review and in a pamphlet titled The Future of the Human Race; or great glorious and future revolution to be effected through the agency of departed spirits of good and superior men and women.

Owen claimed to have had medium contact with the spirits of Benjamin Franklin, Thomas Jefferson and others. He explained that the purpose of these was to change "the present, false, disunited and miserable state of human existence, for a true, united and happy state... to prepare the world for universal peace, and to infuse into all the spirit of charity, forbearance and love."

Spiritualists claimed after Owen's death that his spirit had dictated to the medium Emma Hardinge Britten in 1871 the "Seven Principles of Spiritualism", used by their National Union as "the basis of its religious philosophy".

== Legacy ==
Owen was a reformer, philanthropist, community builder, and spiritualist who spent his life seeking to improve the lives of others. An advocate of the working class, he improved working conditions for factory workers, which he demonstrated at New Lanark, Scotland, became a leader in trade unionism, promoted social equality through his experimental Utopian communities, and supported the passage of child labour laws and free education for children. In these reforms he was ahead of his time. He envisioned a communal society that others could consider and apply as they wished. In Revolution in the Mind and Practice of the Human Race (1849), he went on to say that character is formed by a combination of Nature or God and the circumstances of the individual's experience. Citing beneficial results at New Lanark, Scotland, during 30 years of work there, Owen concluded that a person's "character is not made by, but for the individual," and that nature and society are responsible for each person's character and conduct.

Owen's agitation for social change, along with the work of the Owenites and his children, helped to bring lasting social reforms in women's and workers' rights, establish free public libraries and museums, child care and public, co-educational schools, and pre-Marxian communism, and develop the Co-operative and trade union movements. New Harmony, Indiana, and New Lanark, Scotland, two towns with which he is closely associated, remain as reminders of his efforts.

Owen's legacy of public service continued with his four sons, Robert Dale, William, David Dale, and Richard Dale, and his daughter, Jane, who followed him to America to live in New Harmony, Indiana:

- Robert Dale Owen (1801–1877), an able exponent of his father's doctrines, managed the New Harmony community after his father returned to Britain in 1825. He wrote articles and co-edited with Frances Wright the New-Harmony Gazette in the late 1820s in Indiana and the Free Enquirer in the 1830s in New York City. Owen returned to New Harmony in 1833 and became active in Indiana politics. He was elected to the Indiana House of Representatives (1836–1839 and 1851–1853) and U.S. House of Representatives (1843–1847) and was appointed chargé d'affaires in Naples in 1853–1858. While serving as a member of Congress, he drafted and helped to secure passage of a bill founding the Smithsonian Institution in 1846. He was elected a delegate to the Indiana Constitutional Convention in 1850, and argued in support of widows and married women's property and divorce rights. He also favoured legislation for Indiana's tax-supported public school system. Like his father, he believed in spiritualism, authoring two books on the subject: Footfalls on the Boundary of Another World (1859) and The Debatable Land Between this World and the Next (1872).
- William Owen (1802–1842) moved to the United States with his father in 1824. His business skill, notably his knowledge of cotton goods manufacturing, allowed him to remain at New Harmony after his father returned to Scotland, and serve as an adviser to the community. He organised New Harmony's Thespian Society in 1827 but died of unknown causes at the age of 40.
- Jane Dale Owen Fauntleroy (1805–1861) arrived in the United States in 1833 and settled in New Harmony. She was a musician and educator who set up a school in her home. In 1835 she married Robert Henry Fauntleroy, a civil engineer from Virginia living in New Harmony.
- David Dale Owen (1807–1860) moved to the United States in 1827 and resided at New Harmony for several years. He trained as a geologist and natural scientist and earned a medical degree. He was appointed a United States geologist in 1839. His work included geological surveys in the Midwest, more specifically the states of Indiana, Iowa, Missouri, and Arkansas, as well as Minnesota Territory. His brother Richard succeeded him as state geologist of Indiana.
- Richard Owen (1810–1890) emigrated to the United States in 1827 and joined his siblings at New Harmony. He fought in the Mexican–American War in 1847, taught natural science at Western Military Institute in Tennessee from 1849 to 1859, and earned a medical degree in 1858. During the American Civil War he was a colonel in the Union army and served as a commandant of Camp Morton, a prisoner-of-war camp for Confederate soldiers at Indianapolis, Indiana. After the war, Owen served as Indiana's second state geologist. In addition, he was a professor at Indiana University and chaired its natural science department from 1864 to 1879. He helped plan Purdue University and was appointed its first president in 1872–1874, but resigned before its classes began and resumed teaching at Indiana University. He spent his retirement years on research and writing.

=== Honours and tributes ===
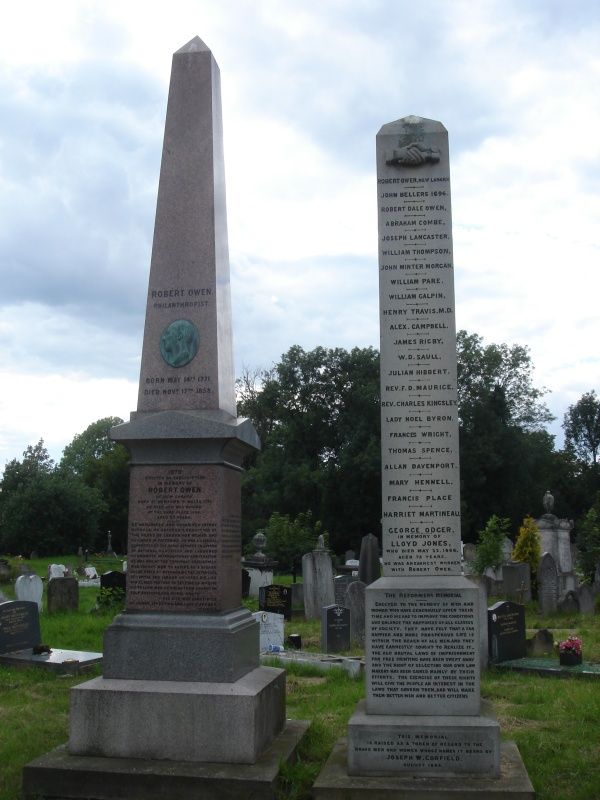
Robert Owen Memorial (left), next to The Reformers Memorial, Kensal Green Cemetery, London

- A simple slate tomb for Owen was installed in St Mary's Churchyard in Newtown. In 1902 the co-operative movement erected Art Nouveau railings around the tomb as a monument to him.
- In 1956 a bronze statue of Owen by Gilbert Bayes was installed in a small garden dedicated to Owen in Newtown.
- The Welsh people donated a bust of Owen by Welsh sculptor Sir William Goscombe John to the International Labour Office library in Geneva, Switzerland.
- In 1994 the Co-operative Bank installed a copy of the Newtown statue in front of its headquarters on Balloon Street, Manchester.

== Criticism ==
Owen's project was considered unachievable because he did not establish a guideline that stipulated the administration of properties and the conditions of memberships. As a result, some critics found his plans unsatisfactory and ineffective because the overpopulation and shortage of supply created antagonism within the community. Owen's opponents view him as a dictator, and a blasphemer of Christianity because he rejected sacred beliefs and defied anyone who differed from his views. Owen perceived religion as a source of fear and ignorance. Therefore, people were unable to think rationally if they stayed attached to "fallacious testimonies" of religion.

Other notable critics of Owen include Karl Marx and Friedrich Engels, even though they viewed his work as a precursor to their own. They recognized in Owen the important understanding, developed by Marx in Capital, that it is the working class that is responsible for creating the unparalleled wealth in capitalist societies. Similarly, Owen also recognized that under the existing economic system, the working class did not automatically receive the benefits of that newly created wealth. Marx and Engels, differentiated, however, their scientific conception of socialism from Owen's societies. They argued that Owen's plan, to create a model socialist utopia to coexist with contemporary society and prove its superiority over time, was insufficient to create a new society. In their view, Owen's "socialism" was utopian, since to Owen and the other utopian socialists "socialism is the expression of absolute truth, reason and justice, and has only to be discovered to conquer all the world by its power." Marx and Engels believed that the overthrow of the capitalist system could only occur once the working class was organized into a revolutionary socialist political party of the working class that was completely independent of all capitalist class influence, whereas the utopians sought the assistance and the co-operation of the capitalists to achieve the transition to socialism.

== Selected published works ==
- A New View of Society: Or, Essays on the Formation of Human Character, and the Application of the Principle to Practice (London, 1813). Retitled, A New View of Society: Or, Essays on the Formation of Human Character Preparatory to the Development of a Plan for Gradually Ameliorating the Condition of Mankind, for the second edition, 1816
- Observations on the Effect of the Manufacturing System. London, 1815
- Report to the Committee of the Association for the Relief of the Manufacturing and Labouring Poor (1817)
- Two Memorials on Behalf of the Working Classes (London: Longman, Hurst, Rees, Orme, and Brown, 1818)
- An Address to the Master Manufacturers of Great Britain: On the Present Existing Evils in the Manufacturing System (Bolton, 1819)
- Report to the County of Lanark of a Plan for relieving Public Distress (Glasgow: Glasgow University Press, 1821)
- An Explanation of the Cause of Distress which pervades the civilised parts of the world (London and Paris, 1823)
- An Address to All Classes in the State. London, 1832
- The Revolution in the Mind and Practice of the Human Race. London, 1849

Collected works:

- A New View of Society and Other Writings, introduction by G. D. H. Cole. London and New York: J. M. Dent & Sons, E. P. Dutton and Co., 1927
- A New View of Society and Other Writings, G. Claeys, ed. London and New York: Penguin Books, 1991
- The Selected Works of Robert Owen, G. Claeys, ed., 4 vols. London: Pickering and Chatto, 1993

Archival collections:

- Robert Owen Collection, National Co-operative Archive, United Kingdom.
- New Harmony, Indiana, Collection, 1814–1884, 1920, 1964, Indiana Historical Society, Indianapolis, Indiana, United States
- New Harmony Series III Collection, Workingmen's Institute, New Harmony, Indiana, United States
- Owen family collection, 1826–1967, bulk 1830–1890, Indiana University Archives, Bloomington, Indiana, United States

== See also ==
- Orbiston Community
- Cincinnati Time Store
- José María Arizmendiarrieta
- Labour voucher
- List of Owenite communities in the United States
- Owenstown
- Owenism
- William King
- Cornelius Blatchley

== Sources ==
- Albjerg, Victor Lincoln (March 1946). Richard Owen: Scotland 1810, Indiana 1890. The Archives of Purdue, no. 2. Lafayette, Indiana.
- Arndt, Karl J. R. (1965). George Rapp's Harmony Society 1785–1847. Philadelphia: University of Pennsylvania Press.
- Baldus, Heather (Spring 2014). "A Broad Stroke: New Harmony's Artistic Legacy". Traces of Indiana and Midwestern History. 26 (2). Indianapolis: Indiana Historical Society: 22–29.
- Bryden, Amanda S.; Weinzapfel, Connie A. (Spring 2014). "Editors' Page: 'That Wonder of the West'". Traces of Indiana and Midwestern History. 26 (2). Indianapolis: Indiana Historical Society: 2–3.
- Clayton, Joseph (1908). Robert Owen: Pioneer of Social Reforms. London: A. C. Fifield.
- Dowd, Douglas F. "Robert Owen". Encyclopædia Britannica (Online ed.). Encyclopædia Britannica Inc.
- Elliott, Josephine Mirabella (December 1964). "The Owen Family Papers". Indiana Magazine of History. 60 (4). Bloomington: Indiana University: 331–52.
- Estabrook, Arthur H. (1923). "The Family History of Robert Owen". Indiana Magazine of History. 19 (1). Bloomington: Indiana University: 63–101.
- Gugin, Linda C.; St. Clair, James E., eds. (2015). Indiana's 200: The People Who Shaped the Hoosier State. Indianapolis: Indiana Historical Society Press. pp. 269–70. ISBN 978-0-87195-387-2.
- Harvey, Rowland Hill. Robert Owen: Social Idealist. Cambridge, Massachusetts: University of California. OCLC 774894.
- "History of Spiritualism". SNU international.
- Leopold, Richard William (1940). Robert Dale Owen, A Biography. Harvard Historical Studies. Vol. 45. Cambridge, Massachusetts: Harvard University Press. OCLC 774894.
- "New Harmony Collection, 1814-1884, Collection Guide" (PDF). Indiana Historical Society. Archived from the original (PDF) on 29 July 2016.
- "New Harmony Series II". Workingmen's Institute. 31 March 2012.
- Owen, Robert (1840). Manifesto of Robert Owen: The discoverer, founder, and promulgator, of the rational system of society, and the rational religion.
- Owen, Robert (1849). Revolution in the Mind and Practice of the Human Race, or, The Coming Change from Irrationality to Rationality. London: Effingham Wilson. OCLC 11756751.
- "Owen, Robert Dale (1801–1877)". Biographical Directory of the United States Congress. U.S. Congress.
- Owen, Robert Dale (1874). Threading My Way, Twenty-seven Years of Autobiography. New York; London: G. W. Carleton and Company: Trubner and Company.
- Pancoast, Elinor; Lincoln, Anne E. (1940). The Incorrigible Idealist: Robert Dale Owen in America. Bloomington, Indiana: Principia Press. OCLC 2000563.
- Parris, Leah (2021). Robert Owen's Welsh Influence on the Scottish Industrial Community of New Lanark (1800 – 1825). Student dissertation for The Open University module A329 The making of Welsh history.online access
- Pitzer, Donald E. (Spring 2014). "Why New Harmony is World Famous". Traces of Indiana and Midwestern History. 26 (2). Indianapolis: Indiana Historical Society: 4–15.
- Pitzer, Donald E. (ed.). Robert Owen's American Legacy: Proceedings of the Robert Owen Bicentennial Conference. Indiana Historical Society.
- Rokicki, Ryan (Spring 2014). "Science in Utopia: New Harmony's Naturalistic Legacy". Traces of Indiana and Midwestern History. 26 (2). Indianapolis: Indiana Historical Society: 50–55.
- Podmore, Frank (1907). Robert Owen: A Biography Vol I. New York: D. Appleton and Company.
- Podmore, Frank (1907). Robert Owen: A Biography Vol II. New York: D. Appleton and Company.
- Rees, Sir James Frederick (2007). "Owen, Robert (1771–1858), Utopian Socialist". Dictionary of Welsh Biography. National Library of Wales. (online version)
- "Robert Owen Blue Plaque". 6 February 2016. Archived from the original on 1 February 2020.
- "Robert Owen Timeline". Robert Owen Museum. 2008. Archived from the original on 10 October 2018.
- "ROC–Robert Owen". National Co-operative Archive. Archived from the original on 9 November 2017.
- Royle, Edward (1998). Robert Owen and the Commencement of the Millennium. Manchester University Press. ISBN 0-7190-5426-5.
- Schuette, Kent (Spring 2014). "New Harmony, Indiana: Three Great Community Experiments". Traces of Indiana and Midwestern History. 26 (2). Indianapolis: Indiana Historical Society: 44–49.
- Spence, Lewis (2003). Encyclopedia of Occultism and Parapsychology. Kessinger Publishing Company. p. 679.
- "Who said this: "all strange but thee and Me"". Literature Network Forums.
