= Owenstown =

Coordinates: 55.600214°N 3.759226°W

Owenstown: Scottish Gaelic: Baile MhicEòghainn; Scots: Owenstoun
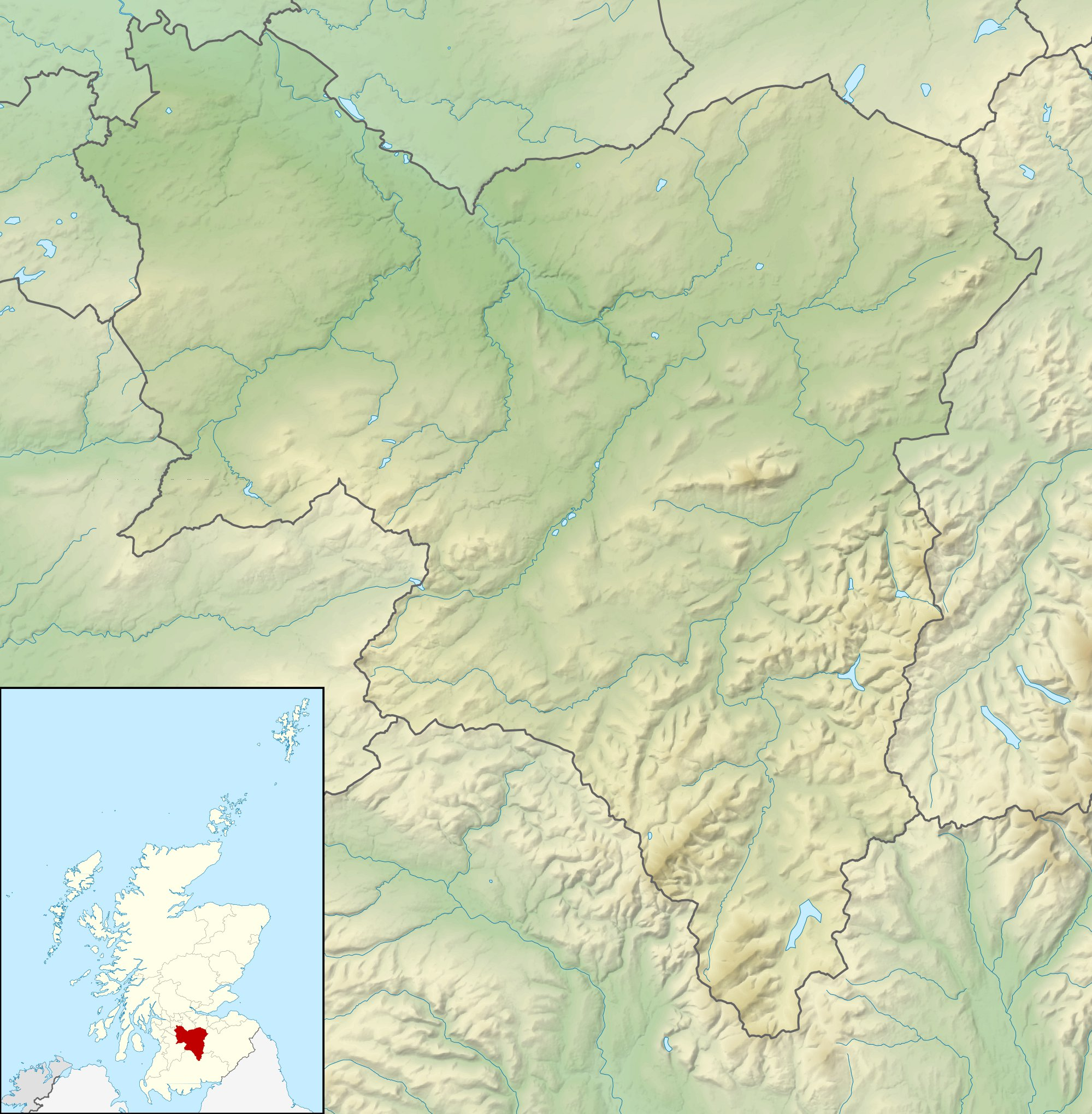
- Location within South Lanarkshire
- OS grid reference: NS892354
- Council area: South Lanarkshire
- Lieutenancy area: Lanarkshire
- Country: Scotland
- Sovereign state: United Kingdom
- Post town: LANARK
- Postcode district: ML11
- Dialling code: 01555
- Police: Scotland
- Fire: Scottish
- Ambulance: Scottish

Owenstown is the name given to a proposed new town of 3200 homes to be built on 400 acres of a 2000-acre site in South Lanarkshire in Scotland, next to Tinto Hill and the small village, Rigside, only three miles north-east of the M74 motorway. The A70 road, from Edinburgh to Ayr, bypasses the site. Owenstown takes its name from the Welsh Social reformer and socialist, Robert Owen, a former owner of the nearby 18th century settlement New Lanark.

== History ==
In August 2009, plans were unveiled to create a new town, which is claimed ro be a modern reinterpretation of New Lanark, housing up to 20,000 residents and supposedly creating several thousand new jobs. The Hometown Foundation, the Scottish-based charity behind the project, said the town would be a realisation of the principles of Robert Owen, who had structured New Lanark under improved living and working conditions as part of a model industrial town, but was never able to achieve his ambitions.

The town would be supposedly managed on co-operative principles by the residents of the town themselves, promoting community involvement and health and well-being from within, forming recreational facilities and green areas, and also to run the town to be energy-efficient and encourage its own economic development. The many various town services on offer would be mostly self-sufficient and the whole £500 million development would be created without the need for public funding. All surplus funds generated would be reinvested in the community instead of being taken out by property developers or landowners.

The various houses built would range in different styles, sizes and tenures, but would all be energy efficient. The new community would also be proposed as a low-carbon area, eventually becoming zero-carbon emissions as the town developed.

As well as the homes, there would be office and commercial space, cafes, restaurants and shops, land and buildings for industry, including a modular house factory, a hotel, leisure facilities, a care home, community buildings and public parks as well as two new primary schools and one new secondary school.

The site today still remains empty, as the application for Planning Permission in Principle which was submitted in November 2012, is still lying with South Lanarkshire Council awaiting approval. Over the years there has been a substantial programme of public consultation including public exhibitions and meetings in nearby settlements such as Lanark. If approved, the project would take up to 10 years to complete. Many supporters including local and national politicians have already made favourable comments about the project and the social and economic benefits it would bring to a generally neglected rural area. There have been no significant objections from any of the other public bodies although many individual objections were made to South Lanarkshire Council relating to the unsuitability of the land in question (it is 2000 feet/610 metres up in an exposed location — totally unsuited to most sorts of agriculture/horticulture), the effect on an area of regional significance for natural beauty widely used for leisure pursuits, and the effect on the limited infrastructure and the destabilising effect on adjacent traditional small towns. In particular there are far mor important sites for development within Lanarkshire which remain undeveloped or only partially completed after a decade or more due to lack of demand.

Since the plans were announced more than 1500 people from other parts of the UK and further afield have registered their interest in moving to Owenstown to live and work in the new town.

The planning application was turned down by South Lanarkshire Council in 2014. The Trustees are likely to appeal the decision to Scottish Government Ministers because of the significance and importance of the project and if that is unsuccessful, it is likely the Foundation would look for an alternative site elsewhere.

The project has received some media interest since it was first announced in 2009, but little serious scrutiny.

So far in 2014, there has been coverage in the Independent on Sunday and The Scotsman.
