= Ralahine =

Co-operative commune in County Clare, Ireland

- Location in Ireland
- Coordinates: 52.7482°N 8.8407°W
- Country: Ireland
- County: County Clare
- Founded: November 7, 1831
- Dissolved: November 23, 1833
- Founder: John Vandeleur; Edward Thomas Craig

Government
  - Type: Commune

Ralahine (Irish: Ráth Fhlaithín) is a townland of County Clare best known for its experiment in communism in 1831.

The Ralahine Commune was a cooperative society and commune founded in 1831 on the estate of John Scott Vandeleur at Ralahine, Newmarket-on-Fergus, County Clare, Ireland. In an attempt to keep his tenants away from secret societies like the "Ribbonmen", he brought a socialist named Edward Thomas Craig from Manchester, England to advise him on the establishment of the commune, which came into existence on 7 November 1831.

== Location ==
Ralahine is a townland of Munster located about 3 miles south-east of Newmarket-on-Fergus Village in the South of County Clare.

== History ==
John Scott Vandeleur attended a lecture in Dublin in 1823, which was presented by Robert Owen. Ralahine Commune was a 618-acre estate owned by John Vandeleur. Half the estate, some 300 acres, consisted of cultivated land, a bog of sixty-three acres used as a fuel source, a lake for power, and a small stream. Due to bad treatment by John Vandeleur, many of the peasants fought back against those in power and went underground forming various gangs. These gangs roamed the country controlled by no one, not even the priesthood. Some of these gangs included the Whitefeet, Lady Clare's Boys and the Terry Alts, named after Terry Alt from Corofin, a Protestant army pensioner and an ardent loyalist. Clare was a particularly violent place at the time, being compared to as the most crime-ridden county in Ireland.

=== Life in the Ralahine Commune ===
Vandeleur spent many years planning the layout of the commune. He wanted to build a weaving factory, a flax scutching mill and housing for those who would work and live in the Ralahine commune. The commune was made up of 52 members, 7 married couples, 21 single men, 5 single women, 5 children under the age of 5, and 7 orphans below the age of 17. Rent in the commune cost 700 pounds per year, until those paying rent could afford to buy the property off of Vandeleur himself, under an agreement signed between the commune members and Vandeleur.

A list of many rules was written up and each member of the commune had to live by them. Alcohol, tobacco and snuff were banned, as was gambling of any kind. The members had to work twelve hours a day in summer and from dawn to dusk in winter, with a one-hour break for dinner. The commune had many purposes, such as acquiring common capital, to protect the members from sickness and old age, to improve the morale and mentality of the adult members, and lastly, to educate the children of the commune.

Instead of money, the workers were paid "labour notes" which they could spend in the co-operative store. In this way, the commune would be more self-sufficient as the members would be buying goods they themselves had worked to produce. If they wished to spend money outside the commune, the treasurer would change the labour notes into coin for them. The commune prospered for a time and 29 new members joined. New machinery was bought and the first mowing machine in Ireland was introduced by the Ralahine Commune. Wages varied depending on the gender of the workers, seeing male farm labourers earn 8p a day, and female workers earn 5p a day.

=== Religion ===
Due to the area that the Ralahine commune was established at being of Irish nationality, the religion that the members of the commune followed was Catholic. The only Protestant members of the commune was Vandeleur, his family, Craig, and his wife Mary.

=== Commune downfall ===
The commune was viewed as a success under the guidance of Edward T. Craig, who ran the schools, and taught the society how to make bread. Ralahine commune seemed to prosper and give hope of a new agrarian order in turbulent times, but went crash when the benefactor, owner of the 600-odd acre property on which it was situated, gambled away all his property and was ruined. As Craig relieved Vandeleur of the responsibility of running his estate, he spent more and more time at his club. His debts mounted and he absconded. On 23 November 1833 the experiment came to an end. The commune members signed an agreement with Vandeleur, which saw them being evicted from the commune when Vandeleur went bankrupt due to his gambling losses. Members of the Ralahine commune who were paid by Vandeleur by "labour notes" were reimbursed by Edward Craig himself, out of his own fortune. The collapse of the Ralahine Commune led to Edward Craig's reputation and legacy being damaged.
