= John Cleave =

British religious leader (1790–1847)

- Born: 1790
- Died: 1847 (aged 56–57)
- Occupation(s): Printer, newspaper publisher

John Cleave (1790 – 1847) was a British Chartist leader, a printer and newspaper publisher.

== Career ==
Born in 1790, Cleave went to sea and is first documented for his political activities as late as 1828, in London, working to assist Henry Hetherington at the Civil & Religious Association.

A few years later in 1831 Cleave was a printer at Snow Hill in London then at Shoe Lane where he also operated a bookshop and coffee house alongside his printing business. Cleave was now working on The Poor Man's Guardian along with Henry Hetherington and James Watson.

In 1834, he felt ready to start his own newspaper Cleave's Weekly Police Gazette which as well as reporting on recent crimes also contained a political campaigning and reform element within its pages, a combination that was very successful, being sold to over 40,000 avid readers per week by 1836.

Cleave was refusing to pay stamp duty on his newspaper, in line with other radical publishers and pamphleteers, which of course brought him into conflict with the authorities who levied fines and wanted such seditious radicals imprisoned. It was the view of radical publishers that a free press was vital to social, political and moral improvement and that the government were oppressing the people's firmly held beliefs and rights to communicate. The law was gradually reformed and the fourpenny tax on newspapers was reduced to one-penny and pamphlets had their tax removed altogether.

Also in 1836, Cleave joined forces with William Lovett and Henry Hetherington to form the new London Working Men's Association. He was soon to be closely involved in the National Charter Association too, and was its first Treasurer. In 1837 Cleave accompanied Henry Vincent, a gifted younger orator and emerging Chartist leader, on a speaking tour of northern England where the two men initiated the establishment of Working Men's Associations in northern cities such as Leeds, Kingston upon Hull, and towns such as Bradford, Halifax and Huddersfield. The two men formed strong bonds during this time and Henry Vincent was later to marry Cleave's daughter Lucy in 1841.

In the 1840s as the National Charter Association divided over policy differences and the careers of the early leaders ran their differing courses Cleave sided with the moderate moral force Chartists alongside William Lovett and continued to work for universal suffrage and the complete removal of stamp duty from all newspapers until his death in 1847.
