= Richard Moore (radical) =

English radical politician

Richard Moore (1810–1878) was an English radical politician. He was a moderate Chartist, and heavily involved in the campaign against "taxes on knowledge".

== Early life ==
Moore was born in London 16 October 1810. He worked as a wood-carver, and in time employed his own staff. While young, he began to take a part in radical politics. He became in 1831 a member of the council of Sir Francis Burdett's National Political Union, and assisted Robert Owen's work in Gray's Inn Lane.

== Chartist ==
In 1834 Moore was the leader of a deputation to Lord Melbourne on the question of the social condition of the people. He was a member of the committee for which William Lovett drew up the People's Charter in 1837, as a representative of the London Working-men's Association. In 1839 he was a member of the National Convention which met to promote the passing of the charter, was secretary of the committee which greeted Lovett and John Collins on their release from gaol in 1840, and joined forces with Lovett in the Working-men's Association in 1842. He took part in its meetings in the National Hall, Holborn.

Moore supported the Chartist cause, but not the "physical force" party, and never overstated what the Charter could achieve for the working classes. He joined the People's International League of 1847, set up by Thomas Cooper and William James Linton, with Lovett and John Parry. When the People's Charter Union (CPU) was formed on 10 April 1848, he was appointed its treasurer.

== Aftermath of Chartism ==
In 1849 Moore took up the reform with which he became most involved, the abolition of tax stamps on newspapers. He lobbied Richard Cobden to adopt it, as a way to keep the working and middle classes in touch over financial reforms.

The Charter Union appointed a committee on the tax stamp issue, the National Stamp Abolition Committee (NSAC); the NSAC was in effect the successor to the CPU. It met at Moore's house, and he became its permanent chairman. Between 7 March 1849, when the NSAC was formed, and the repeal of the paper duty in June 1861, Moore attended 390 related meetings. During the same period he was an advanced radical, a steady colleague of Lovett, Henry Hetherington, and James Watson. Hetherington and Watson were original NSAC members; G. J. Holyoake and James Stansfeld then joined. Holyoake sought allies, such as those working to have duties on advertising and paper scrapped, bringing in Charles Cowan.

The NSAC was absorbed after two years by the Association for Promoting the Repeal of Taxes on Knowledge (APRTK or APRTOK), and Moore was one of its most active members, sharing the organisational tasks with Collet Dobson Collet. The officers of the APRTK, set up in 1851, were Thomas Milner Gibson (President), Collet (Secretary), Moore (Chairman), and Francis Place (Treasurer). While the officers were not much affected, the rest of the committee was populated by middle-class radicals, with Cobden dominant; included were John Bright, George Dawson, Charles Gilpin, G. H. Lewes and Edward Miall.

The APRTK continued to campaign, on the issue of postal rates for distribution of newspapers. The matter was addressed in the Post Office Act 1870. A final meeting took place that year, in Moore's house.

== Later life ==
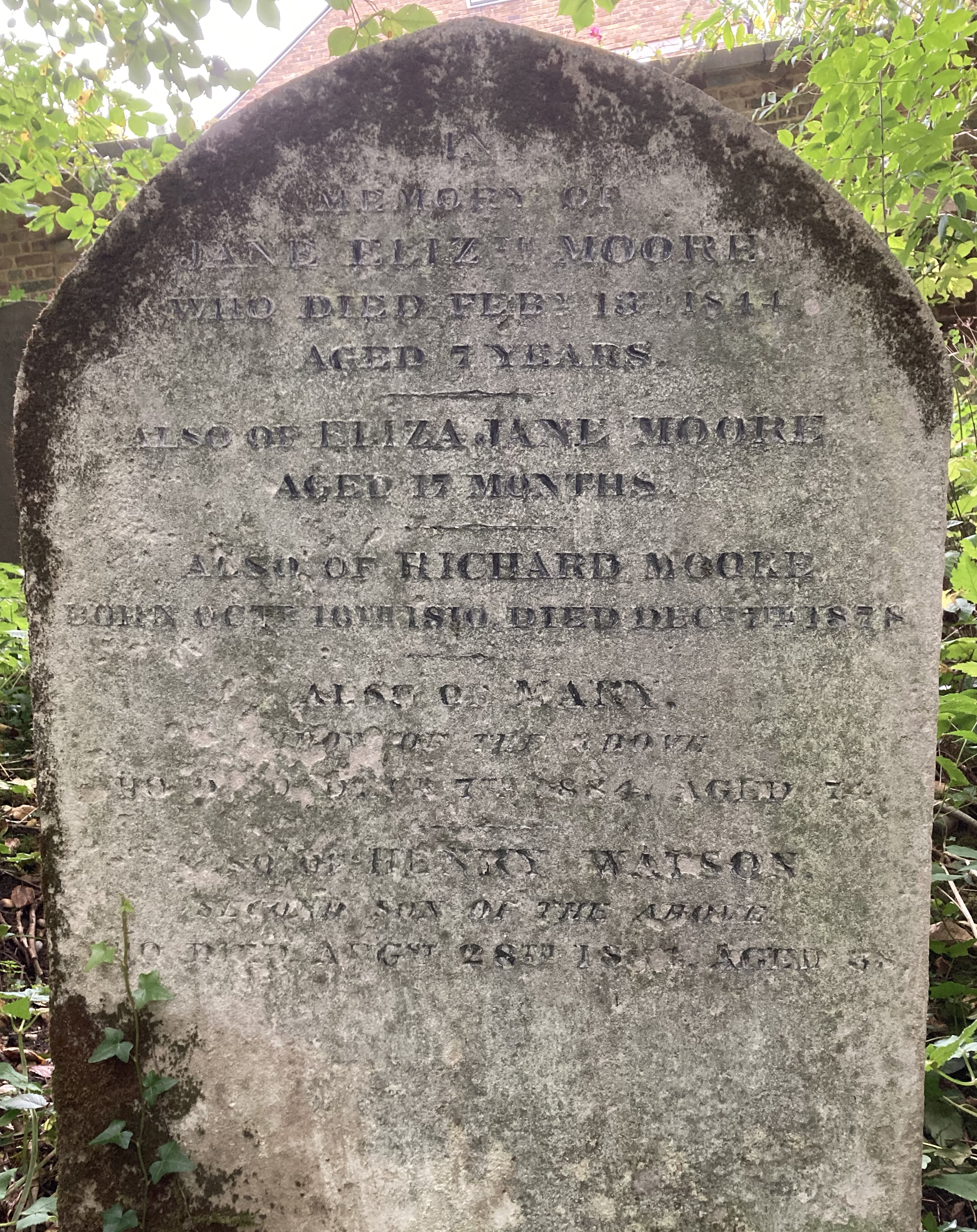
Grave of Richard Moore in Highgate Cemetery

Moore was a member of the Society of the Friends of Italy, the Jamaica Committee, and of numerous other committees and societies. He worked to promote electoral purity in Finsbury, where he had lived from 1832, and assisted in managing the Regent's Park Sunday band.

Moore died on 7 December 1878 and was buried on the western side of Highgate Cemetery.

== Family ==
Moore married, on 9 December 1836, Mary Sharp of Malton, North Yorkshire, a niece of James Watson the publisher and Chartist. She and four of their children survived him.
