= Chartism in Wales =

Chartism originated in Wales (Welsh: Siartiaeth) in Carmarthen under the influence of Hugh Williams, a solicitor and radical reformer. Williams claimed he "got up the first radical meeting in south Wales" in the autumn of 1836 when he founded Carmarthen Working Men's Association. This followed on from the foundation the previous year of the London Working Men's Association by William Lovett and Henry Hetherington, Hetherington was a friend of Hugh Williams and is likely to have influenced his activities in south Wales. The People's Charter, embodying six points, was published in May 1838, with an address by Lovett and Hetherington. It became the focus of widespread meetings in support of its objectives throughout Britain. The People's Charter was later published in Welsh increasing the movement's appeal in Welsh-speaking areas. Chartism in Wales reached its climax in November 1839 with the Newport Rising and subsequent treason trial of Chartist leaders.

== Chartism in Montgomeryshire ==
It was at Newtown, Montgomeryshire that the first great Chartist demonstration in Wales was held on 10 October 1838. The movement here had been led by Thomas Powell, also a personal friend of Hugh Williams and Henry Hetherington. Powell was described by R Williams, in Montgomeryshire Worthies, as "a fiery little Welshman, who had much of the rebel in him, albeit a sensible man, clever and wary" However it was the crisis in the flannel industry in Montgomeryshire in 1838, and the economic insecurity that followed, that led to the spread of Chartism across the county.

In the months that followed, Hetherington visited the area from London, however it was the influence of Birmingham radicals that particularly introduced Chartism into this part of Wales. Further branches of the Working Men's Associations (WMAs) were founded in Newtown, Llanidloes and Welshpool on the model of the Birmingham Political Union.

At the Newtown demonstration, a delegate from Birmingham explained the principles of Chartism and among the speakers was Charles Jones. Jones was chosen as delegate at the Chartist National Convention.

At the end of April 1839, a Chartist uprising took place in Llanidloes. This was the first outbreak of violence in the name of Chartism in Wales. The town was controlled by the protesters until the arrival of the Shropshire Yeomanry

== Chartism in Monmouthshire ==
By the end of 1838, several WMA branches had been founded across Monmouthshire. The first was at Pontypool, probably in 1837. It was towards the end of July 1838 that a branch was formed at Newport.Its founders were baker William Edwards and veteran radical and printer Samuel Etheridge. Soon afterwards, the draper and magistrate, John Frost was also involved in its meetings. A characteristic of the membership of the WMAs in their early days was the prevalence of artisans and tradesmen.

== Chartism in Glamorgan ==
In Glamorgan the centre of Chartism was at Merthyr Tydfil. Then the largest town in Wales (with a population of 34,977 in 1841), it had a long radical tradition. The Merthyr Rising had taken place ten years earlier. The Merthyr branch of the Working Men's Association was formed in October 1838, where Morgan Williams, described by Jones as a "small entrepreneur" was its secretary and leading spokesman at the time.

== Development of Chartism in Wales ==
The scope of the movement in Wales was broadened when Chartist missionaries began to target the industrial districts of Wales. The charismatic Henry Vincent, was at the forefront of this campaign. "When he was invited to speak in Pontnewydd [sic], well over a thousand people packed into the grounds behind John Llewellyn's beerhouse".

Famous Welsh physician William Price was a very well known activist supporter of chartism in 1839.

== Newport Rising ==
The focus of historians to date has been on the flashpoint of the Newport Rising.

== Chartism and the Welsh Language ==
The People's Charter was translated into Welsh in 1838. Areas of Monmouthshire at this time were predominantly Welsh-speaking, as economic migration to this point had largely been from west Wales. Although Chartism was very much a British political movement, the Welsh language was a factor in allowing Chartists to organise in relative secrecy in Wales. This in turn increased the suspicion of the authorities, who were almost exclusively English-speaking.

== Legacy of Chartism in Wales ==
The solidity of Labour's "Red Wall" in the South Wales valleys has been interpreted as a legacy of its fervent Chartist past.

The Chartist Bridge at Blackwood
