= Fraternal Democrats =

- Abbreviation: FD
- Leader: George Julian Harney
- Founders: George Julian Harney; Ernest Charles Jones
- Founded: 22 September 1845
- Dissolved: 1854
- Preceded by: Democratic Friends of all Nations
- Succeeded by: International Association
- Headquarters: London
- Newspaper: Northern Star (1845–1850); The Red Republican (1850); Friend of the People (1850–1852); Star of Freedom (1852); The Vanguard (1853)
- Ideology: Democracy; Internationalism; Republicanism; Socialism; Factions: Chartism; Communism; Nationalism; Neo-Babouvism
- Political position: Left-wing
- Slogan: "All men are brethren"

The Fraternal Democrats (1845–1854; FD) was a left-wing political international that promoted working-class internationalism. Based in London, the organisation counted members from half a dozen European countries, many of whom had fled from their home countries. The Fraternal Democrats were largely democratic, republican and socialist in orientation, although they also counted Chartists, communists and nationalists among their ranks. With its membership largely based in Britain, the organisation was never gained a truly international character, as it was unable to establish national sections within other countries. The Revolutions of 1848 resulted in much of its membership dissipating, in order to return to their native countries and participate in the revolutionary events. By the mid-1850s, the FD was succeeded by the International Association, which lay the foundations for the International Workingmen's Association (IWMA).

== Background ==
During the 1820s, republicans and socialist refugees from throughout Europe began to seek asylum in London, where they were extended civil liberties under the British constitution and found sympathetic allies in local Radicals.

Utopian socialism, which upheld ideals of "universal brotherhood", circulated widely among political exiles of many different nations. Key to the growth of working-class internationalism was the political philosopher Robert Owen, who in 1835 established the Association of All Classes of All Nations, which corresponded with socialists in Belgium, France, Germany and the United States.

The London Working Men's Association (LWMA) soon began reaching out to Belgian and Polish socialists, expressing international solidarity with their movements in some of the first written statements of working-class internationalism. In 1844, LWMA founder William Lovett attempted to establish a democratic-cosmopolitan organisation, the Democratic Friends of all Nations, but it was short lived.

== History ==
=== Foundation ===
By the 1840s, contacts between radicals of different nationalities had solidified and grown, culminating in 1845, with the establishment of the Fraternal Democrats (FD), one of the first political internationals in history. The two founding figures of the FD were the Chartists George Julian Harney, a British internationalist with strong ties to Germany, and Ernest Charles Jones, the editor of the newspaper Northern Star.

The FD was formed by Chartists of the LWMA, Neo-Babouvists of the French Democratic Society (French: Société démocratique française; SDF), Swiss federalists, Italian and Polish nationalists. The Fraternal Democrats met in the Red Lion pub, in Soho's Great Windmill Street, where they were joined by the communists of the German Workers Educational Association (German: Deutscher Arbeiterbildungsverein; GWEA), itself affiliated with the League of the Just and later the Communist League. From the outset, the FD was ideologically fragmented, with the French Republicans, British Chartists, Italian and Polish nationalists, and German communists all having different political models in mind.

The founding meeting of the FD was held on 22 September 1845, commemorating the anniversary of the French First Republic, at a congress attended by more than 1,000 people from throughout Europe. Its events brought together democrats of various nationalities to celebrate democratic-republican history and promote working-class internationalism. During the first years of its existence, the organization grew rapidly to count thousands of card-carrying members, with many of its events receiving a mass attendance.

=== Decline and dissolution ===
In 1846, Karl Marx established a correspondence committee to keep British, French and German socialists in touch with each other. In response to a congress on free trade, which was held in Brussels in September 1847, Marx, Harney and Friedrich Engels attempted to establish a genuinely international organisation, with sections in countries other than Britain. Its efforts to establish sections in France and Belgium were short-lived, as the outbreak of the Revolutions of 1848 provoked many of the FD's members to return from exile and participate in the revolutionary events in their native countries.

After the February Revolution established the French Second Republic, Harney and Jones travelled to Paris, along with the German communists Karl Schapper, Joseph Moll and Heinrich Bauer, in order to support the Provisional Government. As revolution spread across the continent, and Chartism and Irish nationalism grew in the United Kingdom, the British government passed the Aliens Act, which resulted in the removal of all foreign citizens from the FD's membership. The FD survived in a rump state, until its final dissolution in 1854.

== Organizational structure ==
The Fraternal Democrats had more than 20 branches, including that of its headquarters London. It had a set of rules and conditions for its members to follow and issued membership cards. Although the membership was largely based in Britain, it had a cosmopolitan character; its international committee drew representatives from each of its national sections. The FD had thousands of members, with its events regularly being attended by thousands of people.

== Ideology ==
The FD's programme of workers' internationalism was first developed by George Julian Harney and then expanded on by the German communists; in The Communist Manifesto, Karl Marx and Friedrich Engels penned the slogan of working-class internationalism: "Workers of the World, Unite!" The Fraternal Democrats' internationalist programme was opposed to national prejudices, as it considered racism and xenophobia to be means for the ruling class to divide and rule the working class. The FD emphasised the common interests of the working class, across national lines, and called for workers to unite and fight against their rulers. According to Harney, "The cause of the people in all countries is the same – the cause of labour, enslaved and plundered labour."

The FD supported the cause of Polish nationalism, lending its backing to the Greater Poland Uprising of 1846. Under the slogan "No vote! No musket!", they positioned themselves in opposition to international wars, instead calling for the creation of a "Congress of Nations" to arbitrate international disputes. However, they did not oppose all kinds of war, as they believed that class conflict was necessary to overthrow tyranny and oppression. The FD's advocacy of class conflict led to some Chartists splitting from the organisation in 1847; they went on to establish the People's International League, which aligned closer to Giuseppe Mazzini's internationalist ideology. For his own part, Harney continued to advocate for Chartism, which he saw as complementary to "continental socialism".

== Legacy ==
The FD was succeeded by the International Association (IA), established by British Chartists together with French, German, Italian, Polish and Spanish socialists. The FD and IA went on to lay the foundations for the establishment of the International Workingmen's Association (IWMA), which counted former Fraternal Democrats Ludwik Oborski and Karl Schapper among its members.

== Bibliography ==
- Bensimon, Fabrice (2018). "The IWMA and Its Precursors in London, c. 1830–1860" (PDF). "Arise Ye Wretched of the Earth": The First International in a Global Perspective. pp. 21–38. doi:10.1163/9789004335462_003. ISBN 9789004335462. OCLC 10023109880.
- Bensimon, Fabrice (2020). "Continental exiles, Chartists and socialists in London (1834–1848)". History of European Ideas. 47 (2): 271–284. doi:10.1080/01916599.2020.1798624.
- Collins, Henry; Abramsky, Chimen (1965). Karl Marx and the British Labour Movement: Years of the First International. London: Macmillan. OCLC 802881640.
- Lehning, Arthur Mueller (1938). "The International Association (1855-1859): a Contribution to the Preliminary History of the First International". International Review for Social History. 3: 185–284. doi:10.1017/S187308410000032X. ISSN 0020-8590.
- Prothero, Iorwerth (2003). "Chartists and Political Refugees". In Freitag, Sabine; Muhs, Rudolf (eds.). Exiles From European Revolutions: Refugees in Mid-Victorian England. Berghahn Books. pp. 209–233. doi:10.1515/9781782389798-015. ISBN 978-1-78238-979-8.
- Stekloff, G. M. (1968) [1928]. "Harbingers of The International". History of The First International. Translated by Paul, Eden; Paul, Cedar. Russell & Russell. pp. 13–33. OCLC 268772.
- Weisser, Henry (1971). "Chartist Internationalism, 1845–1848". The Historical Journal. 14 (1): 49–66. doi:10.1017/S0018246X00007391.
