= Democratic Friends of all Nations =

Left-wing political international (1844–1845)

Democratic Friends of All Nations
- Leader: William Lovett
- Chairperson: Ludwik Oborski
- Secretary: Karl Schapper
- Founded: 19 October 1844
- Dissolved: 1845
- Succeeded by: Fraternal Democrats
- Headquarters: London
- Newspaper: Movement
- Ideology: Democracy; Internationalism; Radicalism; Socialism; Factions: Chartism; Communism; Republicanism; Owenism
- Political position: Left-wing
- Slogan: "All Men are Brethren"

The Democratic Friends of All Nations was a short-lived left-wing political international established by Chartists, Owenites, democrats and communists from England, France, Germany and Poland. It was intended to promote fraternity between workers of different countries. Although it maintained a broad programme, the organisation quickly fell into internal divisions and dissolved within a year.

== Establishment ==
In July 1844, at an anniversary celebration of the Storming of the Bastille in London, workers from a number of European nations called for the establishment of a political international to provide aid to exiled radicals. Over the following months, English Chartists and foreign republicans began making preparations for an international meeting. Invitations for a dinner to be held in September 1844, in commemoration of the 1791 abolition of the French monarchy, were sent out to left-wing activists from England, France, Germany, Italy, Poland, Spain and Switzerland.

As preparations were under way, the organisers received news that the German communist Wilhelm Weitling arrived in London. The meeting was then reorganised into a reception for Weitling, with the main aim being to establish an international organisation for socialists of different nationalities. Among the notable speakers scheduled to address the meeting were George Holyoake, an Owenite and atheist activist, and Joseph Moll, a member of Weitling's League of the Just. Speakers at the meeting expressed hope that it marked the beginning of a "new era" of international socialist cooperation. However, differences quickly emerged between the various national groupings, as Weitling's belief in class conflict and the use of violence clashed with the utopian socialism of the Owenites. French democrats criticised the split between the Chartists and Owenites, which had divided the English socialist movement. And when Holyoake advocated for a Mazzinian position that combined nationalism and internationalism, he was heavily criticised for it. In contrast, the German internationalist Karl Schapper called for socialists to replace the idea of "foreigners" with that of "brothers".

The day after the meeting, the originally-planned commemoration of the French First Republic was held, with participants hailing from the French Democratic Society and the London Working Men's Association. At the meeting, the Chartist Henry Hetherington gave a speech calling for popular education and for an alliance between workers and the middle class. Once the socialists of different nationalities were well-acquainted with each other, in October 1844, the Chartists called a general conference and invited delegates from France and Germany: Joseph Moll, Karl Schapper and Wilhelm Weitling represented the German League of the Just; Chimann represented the French Democratic Society; George Holyoake and Malthus Questall Ryall represented the Owenites; and Henry Hetherington, Peter Murray McDouall and Thomas Martin Wheeler represented the Chartists. On 19 October 1844, they proclaimed the establishment of the Democratic Friends of All Nations. It called for the cultivation of fraternal relations between democratic activists of all countries, in order to support the advancement of social and political rights throughout Europe.

== Organisation ==
The organisation adopted a broad and minimal platform, in an attempt to not alienate any of its affiliate members by contradicting their own aims and principles. It nevertheless limited the organisation's activities to sharing and discussing information, and insisted on a strict adherence to the law. It also adopted a loose structure, with an honorary secretary being rotated every six months and a chairman at its monthly meetings being the only central roles. Member sections were not required to make financial contributions and there were no formal requirements for membership. Every participant at a meeting was given a vote, with provisions made to prevent participants from introducing "irrelevant matters" that could disrupt proceedings and divide the membership. As the organisation was intended to be based in London, none of the individual member organisations were granted their own representatives and no efforts were made to establish an international network with other organisations outside the United Kingdom. As the majority of the members were refugees from other countries, their situation was the focus of the organisation's activities.

The organisation's first proclamation was signed by Karl Schapper, as honorary secretary, and the Polish revolutionary Ludwik Oborski, as chairman; William Lovett later claimed to be the sole author of the proclamation. The proclamation expressed the organisations' programme with the motto "All Men are Brethren", which was adopted by several organisations over the subsequent years as a slogan of proletarian internationalism. Although it expressed its intention to cultivate international fraternity, the organisation did not explicitly elaborate its ultimate goal in doing so, to ensure its message maintained a universal appeal for all democrats and socialists. It blamed the problems in European society on political corruption and unregulated monopolies, rather than profit and the distribution of wealth

== Dissolution and legacy ==
Within a year of its establishment, the Democratic Friends of All Nations collapsed. Internal divisions between continental advocates of violent revolution and English advocates of peaceful education caused the organisation to break apart. The organisation was soon replaced by the Fraternal Democrats, although many Chartist members went on to join Giuseppe Mazzini's People's International League.

The Democratic Friends of All Nations was the first attempt to create a formalised workers' international. It was followed in 1855 by the International Association (IA) and later in 1864 by the International Workingmen's Association (IWA).

== Bibliography ==
- Herod, Andrew (1997). "Labor as an Agent of Globalization and as a Global Agent". In Cox, Kevin R. (ed.). Spaces of Globalization: Reasserting the Power of the Local. Guilford Press. ISBN 9781572301993.
- Latter, Christine (1988). "The Beginnings of Socialist Internationalism in the 1840's: The "Democratic Friends of all Nations" in London". Internationalism in the Labour Movement 1830–1940. Brill. pp. 259–282. doi:10.1163/9789004625006_017. ISBN 90-04-08555-6.
- Weisser, Henry (1971). "Chartist Internationalism, 1845–1848". The Historical Journal. 14 (1): 49–66. doi:10.1017/S0018246X00007391.
