= Richard Spurr =

British chartist leader

Richard Spurr (1800–1855) was a Cornish cabinet maker and lay preacher who was imprisoned for his part in leading the political movement Chartism.

== Early life ==
Richard Spurr was born son of Christopher Spurr and Christian Richards in 1800 in Truro, Cornwall, where he became a cabinet maker and carpenter. He was married on his 21st birthday in Saint Helier, Jersey to Ann Mary Babot who was born there in 1803.

In 1840, now living in London, he was one of eleven signatories to Henry Vincent's address on teetotalism who described themselves as political victims.

== Involvement in the Chartist Movement ==
He became interested in promoting peoples’ rights whilst operating from premises in Pyder Street, Truro, and was a leader of the Chartist Movement in Cornwall. Possibly he may have been influenced by William Lovett who, like Richard, was a Cornish cabinet maker.

Spurr was arrested by police with drawn cutlasses on Thursday 16 January 1840 at the Trades' Hall, Bethnal Green whilst addressing an LDA meeting of about 700 people "to put their trust in God and keep their powder dry" and sent to Newgate Gaol to await trial at the Central Criminal Court.

He later represented London at the famous 1840 Manchester Conference.

Initially a member of the National Charter Association of Great Britain and Ireland, standing for election to its executive committee in May 1841, he became an early member of the National Association for Promoting the Political and Social Improvement of the People, founded in 1841 by William Lovett There is much written about Richard Spurr in the newspapers of the day, but also in books including full chapters in and "Crime, Protest and Popular Politics in Southern England 1740-1850".

== A new life in Australia ==
By 1848 Chartists were being hunted down, imprisoned and deported. In 1850, possibly after being tipped off as to his impending arrest, Richard Spurr migrated to Australia together with his wife and children aboard the Trafalgar.

According to "Victoria and its Metropolis" Richard Spurr built the first Police Barracks in Melbourne, near his business premises at the corner of Elizabeth Street and Flinders Street. There is a possibility that he was at Eureka Stockade as he was in Ballarat for a while at that time, and the rights being fought for at the Eureka Stockade were very similar to those sought by the Chartists. Many of the leaders at the Eureka Stockade were Chartist members. The nights before the military attack on the stockade there were up 1,500 people there, but dropped to about 150 on the day of the attack.

== Death ==
Richard Spurr died in January 1855 (within 2 months of the Eureka Stockade) and so never saw true democracy introduced to England or Australia. However as a result of the Eureka Stockade democratic reform became a reality in Victoria over the next couple of years. Richard Spurr is buried in the Melbourne General Cemetery grave # CE 2 1201, where his headstone reads:

IN LOVING MEMORY OF RICHARD SPURR
DIED 25 JANUARY 1855
AGED 54 YEARS

Writing recently, Richard's descendant Noel Spurr OAM pondered the question as to whether his great great-grandfather may have died of a broken heart, "believing that after half a lifetime of involvement, nothing had changed, that people were killed for nothing".
