= International Committee =

International Committee may refer to:

- International Committee for the Nanking Safety Zone
- International Committee (1855)
