= National Association for Promoting the Political and Social Improvement of the People =

Chartist organisation

The National Association for Promoting the Political and Social Improvement of the People was founded, in Britain, in 1841 by William Lovett in order to put his form of "educational chartism" into practice. This was denounced by the Northern Star as a "New Move", resulting in its members becoming isolated from those involved with the National Chartism Association.

The manifesto of the National Association for Promoting the Political and Social Improvement of the People was drafted by William Lovett, John Collins (of Birmingham, England), and Henry Vincent. Several people who had been prominent in London working-class radicalism and Chartism joined the National Association, including Henry Vincent, James Watson, Richard Moore, Nesson, Charles and James Savage, Charles Westerton, Arthur Dyson, Richard Spurr, James Hoppey and James Peat.
