= Police Gazette =

Police Gazette, or some variation thereof has been the title of several magazines:

- Police Gazette (Great Britain and Ireland), first published in 1772
- Cleave's Weekly Police Gazette, published between 1836 and 1838 in London.
- Penny Sunday Times and People's Police Gazette, published in 1840-1842 in London by E. Lloyd at Shoreditch and Strand
- National Police Gazette, an American magazine published between 1845 and 1977
- Victoria Police Gazette, published in Australia between 1853 and 1870

== Other ==
- Police Gazette (painting) an abstract painting by Willem de Kooning.
- Police Gazette, the working title of James Ellroy's 2009 novel Blood's a Rover
