= LWMA =

LWMA may refer to

- London Working Men's Association
- Left-wing market anarchism
- Lee Wei Min Architects
