= National Hall, Holborn =

Coordinates: 51.5174°N 0.1201°W

The National Hall, Holborn was a building in High Holborn, London, owned in the 1840s by the National Association for Promoting the Political and Social Improvement of the People. The lease of 242A High Holborn was taken by the National Association in January 1842, for the "Hall of the National Association", which was fitted out in the second half of 1842.

The National Association folded in 1849, and the Hall was transferred to a group of trustees. It retained the name until it was converted, with other properties on the same site, into Weston's Music Hall in 1857.

== Functions ==
The National Hall was opened in July 1842, and was created from Gate Street Chapel. It had a number of educational and social functions, including meetings and lectures. There was a school on Sundays, run by William Lovett, and from 1848 he supervised a day school there. William Ellis taught from 1850. The Hall's capacity was 2,000, and classes were held in dancing and phrenology.

James Watson was appointed Treasurer of the Hall, and Lovett Secretary. Lecturers included Thomas Cooper, Edward William Elton, William Johnson Fox, John Humffreys Parry and Philip William Perfitt.
