= Henry Vincent =

English religious leader (1813–1878)

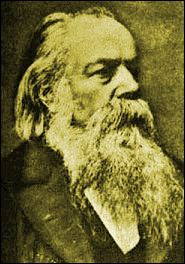

Henry Vincent (10 May 1813 – 29 December 1878) was an English religious leader. active in the formation of early Working Men's Associations in Britain, a popular Chartist leader, brilliant and gifted public orator, prospective but ultimately unsuccessful Victorian member of parliament, and later an anti-slavery campaigner.

== Early life ==
Vincent was born in High Holborn, the son of a goldsmith. He saw his father's business fail, a decline in circumstances that prompted the family to move to Kingston upon Hull.

By 1828, Vincent was a young apprentice boy in the growing printing trade. Once his apprenticeship was completed he returned to London to pursue his printing career. At this time he was very interested in the views of Tom Paine and especially Paine's views on universal suffrage (including votes for women) and state welfare benefits.

== Political awakening ==
By 1833, Vincent was in London working as a printer but also deepening his political awareness and knowledge. In 1836, he joined the recently formed London Working Men's Association and he was quickly recognised as one of the best young orators promoting universal suffrage and workers rights.

In 1837, he accompanied John Cleave on a summer speaking tour in the industrial north of England and they helped local activists to establish Working Men's Associations in Hull, Leeds, Bradford, Halifax and Huddersfield.

== Responsibility and resistance ==
In 1838, Vincent was given responsibility for promoting universal suffrage and welfare benefits and Working Men's Associations in industrial South Wales and the West Country from Cornwall up to Wiltshire and Gloucestershire.

During this time the message of votes for all, improvement of working conditions, shorter work days (Early Closing Movement), adequate wages and the right to meet to improve conditions for all was meeting stiff resistance from the Establishment, gentry, employers and industrialists. During a visit to Devizes, Vincent was knocked unconscious when he was beaten up.

== Oratorial virtuosity and appearance ==
Vincent was an experienced public speaker who used a logical approach. He successfully communicated his message to a diverse audience. It was said of him that he was

much below the middle size. His person however was extremely graceful, and he appeared on the platform to much advantage. With a fine, mellow flexible voice, a florid complexion and, excepting in intervals of passion, a most winning expression, he had only to present himself to win all hearts over to his side.

RC Gammage in his account of "The History of The Chartist Movement" in 1859:

his attitude was perhaps the most easy and graceful of any popular orator of the time. For fluency of speech he rivalled all his contemporaries, few of whom were anxious to stand beside him on the platform. His rare powers of imitation irresistibly drew peals of laughter from the gravest audience. His versatility, which enabled him to change from grave to gay and vice versa and to assume a dozen various characters in almost as many minutes, was one of the secrets of his success. With the fair sex his slight handsome figure, the merry twinkle of his eye, his incomparable mimicry, his passionate bursts of enthusiasm, the rich music of his voice, and above all, his appeals for the elevation of woman rendered him a universal favourite and the Democrats of both sexes regarded him as the young Demosthenes of English Democracy.

== Target of the authorities ==
The authorities sought to obstruct Vincent and deny him the opportunity to speak out. They feared a worker's revolution with resulting violence and damage to property, and they were particularly opposed to those Chartists who were advocating the use of physical force to achieve their aims and vent their resentment and fury.

Government spies followed Vincent, seeking evidence to arrest and convict him at a time when transportation to Australia or death by hanging were some of the punishments for stirring up social unrest.

== Gaol ==
In May 1839, Vincent was arrested and imprisoned at Monmouth County Gaol for making inflammatory remarks. He was eventually tried at Shire Hall, Monmouth on 2 August 1839 and sentenced to one year imprisonment.

Whilst in prison, he was denied writing materials and only permitted religious books as reading material.

It was in part at least the arrest of this prominent and popular chartist leader that gave rise to the Newport Rising in South Wales 1839.

== Release, rearrest and gaol again ==
Upon release, Vincent found himself under close scrutiny again. He was re-arrested almost immediately for "using seditious language".

In court, he conducted his own defence, but was found guilty and sentenced to another year imprisonment.

This time, he was permitted visits from, amongst others, Francis Place, who was allowed to teach Vincent French, political economy and history.

== Release, marriage and a new publication ==
Upon his release from prison in January 1841 Vincent made plans to marry Lucy, the daughter of John Cleave, editor of the Working Man's Friend. The newly married couple took up residence in Bath, amongst close friends and supporters and began the publication of The National Vindicator.

== Modified stance and message ==
Vincent was immediately back on the road, making up for lost time and promulgating the Chartist message throughout the country. This time he was shrewd enough to take a stance with the "moral force" chartists under William Lovett rather than the "physical force chartists" and spoke using less inflammatory language, focusing on improving education and the moral improvement of the working classes. He now joined groups linked with the more readily popular temperance movement and helped form teetotal political societies. Many of the leading industrialists, or their wives, were in favour of teetotalism and temperance, and condemned the social evils of drink.

However, there was a price to pay for this moderate stance. Previously close allies within the Chartist movement such as Feargus O'Connor now fell out with Vincent, disagreeing over the watering down of the physical force message and the distraction of the non-central temperance message.

In 1842, Vincent contributed to the setting up of the Complete Suffrage Union. Although still a member of the National Charter Association, Vincent was no longer as prominent an orator or as closely allied with the leading figures of the Chartist movement. Some of his earlier associations had by this point ended.

== Attempted political career ==
The National Vindicator ceased publication in 1842 and Vincent focused more on lectures, on wider subjects than Chartism. He gave a lecture on the Great Exhibition at the Concert-room in Wisbech in 1851. He stood for election as an Independent Radical in Ipswich (1842 and 1847), Tavistock (1843), Kilmarnock (1844), Plymouth (1846), and finally York (1848 and 1852). He was unsuccessful each time.

== Later career ==
Despite these setbacks, Vincent continued to hold and develop his views and was invited to speak on long tours of America in 1866, 1867 and again in 1875 and 1876. Anti-slavery was his focus at this stage. He also spoke by invitation on progressive political subjects, such as "Oliver Cromwell" in Rochester, New York on 2 December 1869.

His wider travels stimulated his interest in world politics and working conditions. In 1876, he was active in opposing atrocities that had taken place in Bulgaria.

On 8 November 1876, in connection with the Huddersfield Literary and Scientific Institution, Vincent gave a lecture entitled: "The English-Speaking Race: Its Conflicts and Triumphs".

== Death and legacy ==
Vincent died on 29 December 1878, aged 65, and is buried at Abney Park Cemetery in Stoke Newington.
