= Henry Hetherington =

English printer, bookseller, publisher and activist (1792–1849)

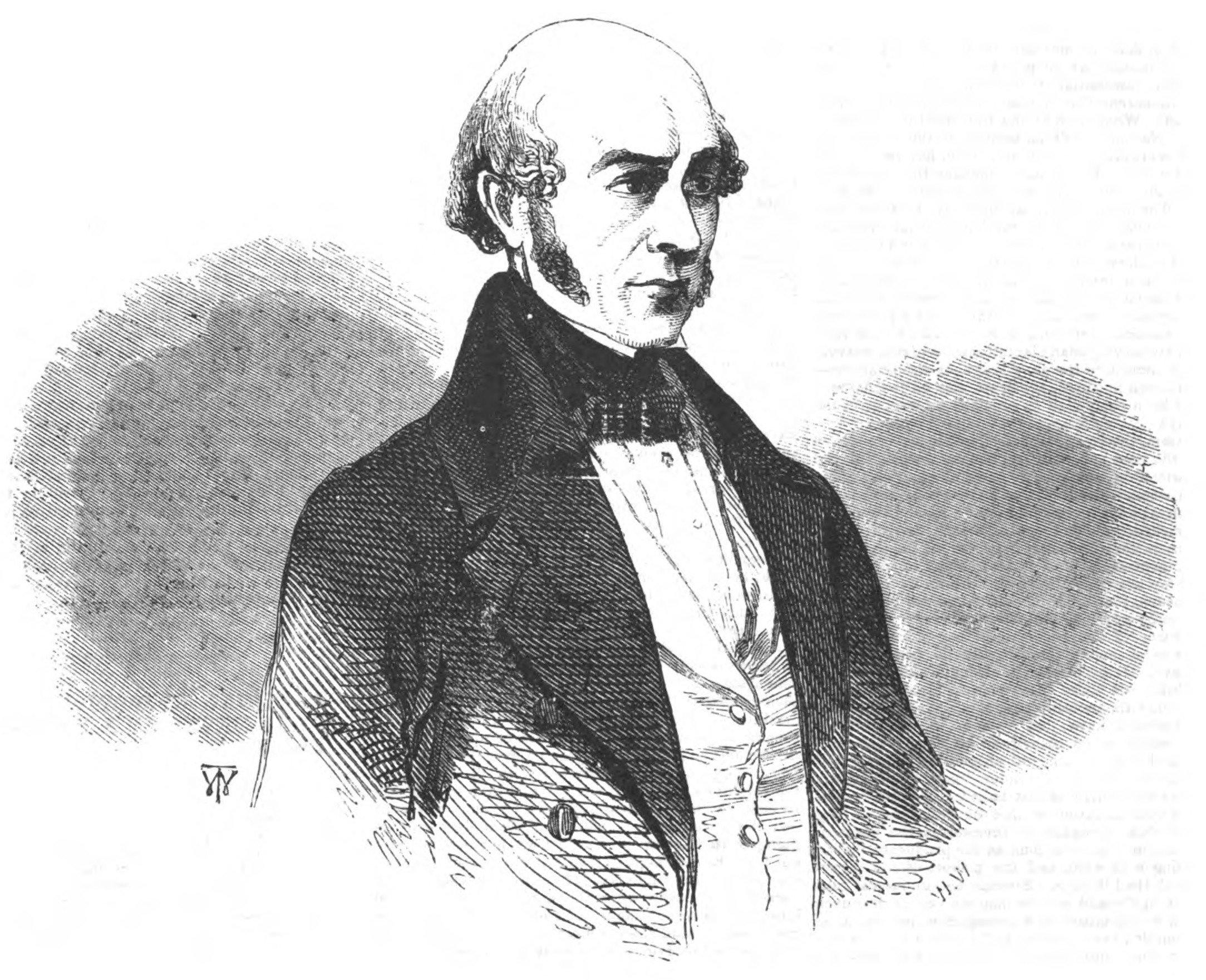
- Born: June 1792; Soho, London, England
- Died: 24 August 1849 (aged 57); Hanover Square, London, England
- Resting place: Kensal Green Cemetery
- Occupations: Printer and publisher
- Employer: Luke Hansard
- Known for: Suffragist and social activist
- Movement: Chartism
- Criminal charges: Blasphemy; non-payment of stamp duty
- Spouse: Elizabeth Thomas (1811–?)
- Children: 9

Henry Hetherington (June 1792 – 24 August 1849) was an English printer, bookseller, publisher and newspaper proprietor who campaigned for social justice, a free press, universal suffrage and religious freethought. Together with his close associates, William Lovett, John Cleave and James Watson, he was a leading member of numerous co-operative and radical groups, including the Owenite British Association for the Promotion of Co-operative Knowledge, the National Union of the Working Classes and the London Working Men's Association. As proprietor of The Poor Man's Guardian he played a major role in the "War of the Unstamped" and was imprisoned three times for refusing to pay newspaper stamp duty. He was a leader of the "moral force" wing of the Chartist movement and a supporter of pro-democracy movements in other countries. His name is included on the Reformers' Memorial in Kensal Green Cemetery.

== Biography ==
=== Early years ===
Hetherington was born in June 1792 in Compton Street, Soho, London, son of John Hetherington, a tailor. At thirteen he became an apprentice printer, working for Luke Hansard, the printer of the Journals of the House of Commons. In 1811 Hetherington married Elizabeth Thomas, from Wales, and the marriage produced nine children, although only one, David, survived him. Because work was hard to come by after his apprenticeship ended, Hetherington worked as a printer in Ghent, Belgium from c. 1812 to c. 1815, then returned to London.

=== Co-operation and radical politics ===
During the 1820s Hetherington established his own business as a printer and publisher. He also became an active member of a number of radical organisations whose aims included co-operation, the provision of education to working men and universal suffrage. Through these organisations he made lasting friendships with William Lovett and James Watson, with whom he would work closely for the rest of his life.

In 1820, he became influenced by the ideas of Robert Owen after attending a series of lectures by the Owenite, George Mudie. Together with other printers he became a founder member of Mudie's Co-operative and Economical Society. The society encouraged wholesale trading and set up a co-operative community in Spa Fields.

In 1822, he registered his own press and type at 13 Kingsgate Street, Holborn, an eight-roomed house, including shop and printing premises, costing £55 per annum rent. His first publishing venture, in January 1823, was Mudie's journal, the Political Economist and Universal Philanthropist.

Hetherington then joined the London Mechanics Institute in Chancery Lane, founded by George Birkbeck to provide adult education to working-class men. He served on its committee between 1824 and 1830 and it was there that he met Lovett and Watson.

In 1828, he joined the First London Co-operative Trading Association. Newly formed co-operative societies would often ask the First London for advice and assistance, so Hetherington and others founded the British Association for the Promotion of Co-operative Knowledge (BAPCK) (1829–1831) to act as co-operation's educational and co-ordinating arm. The BAPCK rented a house in Greville Street, Hatton Garden, where they operated a co-operative bazaar on the first floor, while the First London occupied the ground floor. Hetherington became one of the BAPCK's most accomplished speakers and played an important role in the growth of the movement.

Like other leading BAPCK members such as Lovett, Watson and John Cleave, Hetherington did not believe that co-operation could be divorced from the struggle for political rights. While still members of the BAPCK he and the others joined several short-lived radical political groups, whose aims and membership often overlapped. These included, the Civil and Religious Liberty Association (CRLA), which campaigned for Catholic emancipation; the Radical Reform Association (RRA) (1829–1831), led by Henry Hunt to demand universal (male) suffrage; and the National Union of the Working Classes (NUWC) (1831–1835), which absorbed the remnants of all the other groups, to become London's leading ultra-radical force of the early 1830s.

The BAPCK's involvement in radical politics caused a rift with the co-operative movement's figurehead, Robert Owen, who believed that politics were irrelevant to the success of co-operation, and this led to the BAPCK's decline. Hetherington remained loyal to Owen's social and economic views, but criticised his apolitical stance. The main focus of his activities during the 1830s would be universal suffrage and the campaign for a free press.

=== The "War of the Unstamped" ===
In an attempt to prevent working-class people from absorbing radical ideas, the Tory government of Lord Liverpool had increased the stamp duty on newspapers to fourpence in 1815, and extended it to cover periodicals in 1819. This ensured that only the affluent could afford to buy a paper. Radical publishers such as Thomas Wooler, Richard Carlile and William Cobbett sold their publications duty paid, their sales declined and there was little attempt to defy the law during the 1820s.

In 1830, however, the campaign for electoral reform was boosted by the July Revolution in France, which created a market for a radical working-class press. On 1 October, Hetherington published an unstamped paper, The Penny Papers for the People, Published by the Poor Man's Guardian, quickly followed by William Carpenter's Political Letters. Both were prosecuted, thus commencing the War of the Unstamped. Between 1830 and 1836 several hundred unstamped newspapers were published and over 800 people were imprisoned for distributing them. Hetherington published a string of such papers, the best known and most important being The Poor Man's Guardian (1831–1835), whose front page bore the slogan "Established Contrary To "Law" To Try The Power Of "Might" Against "Right"".

Hetherington did not edit his own papers, using James Bronterre O'Brien and other writers to do so. Instead he toured the country, addressing NUWC meetings where he denounced the Whig Reform Bill for excluding working-class voters and the government for suppressing press freedom. He combined these activities with recruiting vendors and setting up distribution networks for his papers.

His high-profile made him one of the government's main targets for prosecution. He was imprisoned three times, fined and his printing presses were seized. He always defended himself in court and his defiant speeches from the dock were sold as cheap pamphlets. His exploits in avoiding the police, such as adopting various disguises, were widely reported in the unstamped press and Hetherington became a hero to his readers. At the height of its popularity (1832–1833), The Poor Man's Guardian sold around 15,000 copies per edition, with a readership of several times that number.

In 1836 the government reduced the stamp duty from four pence to one penny. At the same time it increased fines for non-compliance and imposed such stringent conditions on newspaper publishing that the unstamped press could not survive. Hetherington converted his unstamped Twopenny Dispatch into the stamped London Dispatch and People's Political and Social Reformer, apologising to his readers for the price rise and saying that personal courage was useless against the government's new powers.

=== Chartism ===
Hetherington remained politically active, joining William Lovett's London Working Men's Association (LWMA). This was a small organisation, most of whose members were artisans, and whose primary objective was working-class self-improvement through education. Its activities included discussion groups, research, pamphlets and public meetings. One such meeting, at the Crown and Anchor Tavern in the Strand in February 1837, led to the LWMA drafting the People's Charter for parliamentary reform and Chartism became the main focus of its activity.

Hetherington and other speakers, including John Cleave and Henry Vincent, toured the country promoting universal suffrage and encouraging local groups to organise along LWMA lines. He was an elected delegate to the Chartist "General Convention of the Industrious Classes", which assembled in London and Birmingham 1839 to oversee the presentation of a parliamentary petition in support of the Charter, and to plan Chartism's response in the event of the petition being rejected. During that year he also addressed Chartist meetings in mid-Wales.

Although Hetherington and other LWMA members supported the people's right to bear arms and resist attacks on their liberty, they became identified with "moral-force" Chartism. This put them at odds with "physical-force" Chartists, such as Feargus O'Connor, who, in their opinion, deliberately provoked the authorities to violence. The rift became permanent in 1841 when Lovett, Hetherington and others announced the formation of the National Association for Promoting the Political and Social Improvement of the People (NA), whose aim was to achieve the Charter through educational and moral self-improvement. O'Connor and his supporters in the newly formed National Charter Association (NCA) condemned them as traitors, accusing them of being in league with middle-class reformers trying to dilute the Charter. In spite of Hetherington's angry protestations of their innocence he and the others became exiles from mainstream Chartism.

=== Later years ===
Hetherington remained in the NA for six or so years, but it was a small organisation, never able to challenge the supremacy of O'Connor and the NCA, and he turned his attention to other issues, including religious freethought, international politics and Owenism.

He had been interested in freethought since the 1820s, joining the Freethinking Christians, a small sect. However, after his expulsion for questioning a decision by its leader, Hetherington had written a pamphlet exposing what he saw as the group's hypocrisy. In another pamphlet he had advocated a primitive Christianity without clergy, and in 1840 he had been imprisoned for four months for publishing an allegedly blasphemous book, C. J. Haslam's Letters to the Clergy of All Denominations. In 1846 his commitment to freethought led to a rift with Lovett, after which Hetherington left the NA to join the atheist George Holyoake at the Literary and Scientific Institution, John Street.

The John Street Institution was one of Robert Owen's London bases and during the 1840s Hetherington reconnected with mainstream Owenism. He attended Owen's Rational Society conference in 1845 and, with Owenites such as Holyoake, Lloyd Jones and Robert Buchanan, founded the League of Social Progress in 1848.

Both the LWMA and the NA supported pro-democracy movements in Europe and elsewhere. In 1844, following meetings to support the German radical, Wilhelm Weitling, Hetherington helped to form the Democratic Friends of All Nations, and he later joined Giuseppe Mazzini's Peoples' International League.

He did not, however, abandon his belief in the Charter. He had joined Lovett in an alliance with Joseph Sturge's Complete Suffrage Movement in 1842, and in 1848 he co-founded the moral-force People's Charter Union. This folded within a year and most of its ruling council, including Hetherington, rejoined the fight for a free press by forming the Newspaper Stamp Abolition Committee.

=== Death ===
Hetherington caught cholera in August 1849. He refused medicine in the belief that his long-standing teetotalism would protect him from disease. He died at 57 Judd Street, Hanover Square, London, on 24 August. In his Last Will and Testament he affirmed his atheism, his support for Robert Owen and his belief that it was "the duty of every man to leave the world better than he found it". His non-religious funeral at Kensal Green Cemetery was attended by two thousand mourners.

In 1885 a Reformers' Memorial obelisk, which included Hetherington's name, was erected in the cemetery.

== Organisations with which Hetherington was involved ==
- Co-operative and Economical Society (1821)
- London Mechanics' Institution (now Birkbeck, University of London) (1823–1830) (Hetherington was on the Committee in 1824)
- Freethinking Christians (1824–1827)
- First London Co-operative Trading Association (1828–1829)
- Civil and Religious Liberty Association (1827–1829) (Became Radical Reform Association)
- British Association for the Promotion of Co-operative Knowledge (1829–1831)
- Radical Reform Association (1829) (Hetherington was Secretary of the Association)
- First Middlesex Society (1930)
- Metropolitan Political Union (1830)
- Metropolitan Trades Union (March 1831)
- National Union of the Working Classes (1831–1835)
- Marylebone Radical Association (1834–1836)
- Society for the Protection of Booksellers (April 1834)
- Association of Working Men to Procure a Cheap and Honest Press (April 1836)
- London Working Men's Association (1836–1839)
- Universal Suffrage Club (September 1836)
- Metropolitan Charter Union (March 1840)
- Independent Order of Odd Fellows, Manchester Unity (1840)
- National Association for Promoting the Political and Social Improvement of the People (November 1841–1847)
- Metropolitan Parliamentary Reform Association (1842–1849)
- Literary and Scientific Institution, at John Street, Fitzroy Square, Branch a1 (Mid/Late 1840s)
- Anti-Persecution Union (September 1843–1844)
- Democratic Friends of all Nations (1844)
- Democratic Committee for Poland's Regeneration (March 1846)
- People's International League (April 1847)
- Democratic Committee of Observation on the French Revolution (Early 1848)
- People's Charter Union (March 1848)
- League of Social Progress (November 1848)
- Newspaper Stamp Abolition Committee (1849)

== Hetherington in print ==
=== Newspapers and journals ===
- Political Economist and Universal Philanthropist (1823) (ed. George Mudie)
- Penny Papers for the People (1830–1831) (ed. Thomas Mayhew)
- Radical (later Radical Reformer) (1831–1832) (ed. James Lorymer)
- Republican (1831–1832) (ed. James Lorymer)
- The Poor Man's Guardian (1832–1835) (eds. Thomas Mayhew, James Bronterre O'Brien)*
- Destructive and Poor Man's Conservative (1833–1834) (ed. James Bronterre O'Brien)
- Hetherington's Twopenny Dispatch and People's Police Register (1834–1836) (ed. James Bronterre O'Brien)
- London Dispatch (1836–1839)
- Halfpenny Magazine of Entertainment and Knowledge (1840–1841)
- Odd Fellow (1839–1842) (Eds. James Cooke, W. J. Linton)

=== Pamphlets and leaflets ===
- Principles and Practice contrasted'; or a Peep into "the only true church of God upon earth," commonly called Freethinking Christians (London, Henry Hetherington, 1828).
- Swing, Eh! Outrages in Kent. London: Henry Hetherington, 1830
- Cheap Salvation, or, an Antidote to Priestcraft: Being a Succinct, Practical, Essential, and Rational Religion, Deduced from the New testament, the general Adoption of Which Would Supersede the Necessity for a Hireling Priesthood, and save This Overtaxed Nation Fifteen Million per Annum (London, Henry Hetherington, 1832, reprinted 1843).
- A Full Report of the Trial of Henry Hetherington, on an Indictment for Blasphemy, before Lord Denman and a Special Jury, at the Court of Queen's Bench, Westminster, on Tuesday, 8 December 1840; for Selling Haslam's Letters to the Clergy of all Denominations: With the Whole of the Authorities Cited in the Defence, at Full Length (London, Henry Hetherington, 1841).
- John Bull's Political Catechism. London: Henry Hetherington, n.d.

=== Articles and letters ===
- 'To the Editor of the "Times"' in Poor Man's Guardian, 8 October 1831, p. 108.
- 'To "Sir" Richard Birnie" in Poor Man's Guardian, 8 October 1831, p. 108.
- 'Resistance of Oppression' in Poor Man's Guardian, 22 October 1831, pp. 131–33. Piece dated 13 October 1831.
- 'Magisterial Deliquency' [sic?] in Poor Man's Guardian, 12 November 1831, p. 163.
- 'Mr Carpenter and the Reform Bill!' in Poor Man's Guardian, 19 November 1831, pp. 170–72.
- 'Mr Attwood and the Birmingham Union' in Poor Man's Guardian, 3 December 1831, pp. 186–88.
- '"Infamous Conduct" of Mr Hunt' in Poor Man's Guardian, 17 December 1831, p. 205.
- 'To the Industrious Millions and the Friends of Liberty and Justice' in Poor Man's Guardian, 24 December 1831, pp. 223–24.
- 'More "Infamous" Conduct of Mr Hunt' in Poor Man's Guardian, 31 December 1831, p. 229. Following a response to Hetherington's piece in issue dated 17 December 1831, p. 205.
- 'Mr Owen and the Working Classes [1]' in Poor Man's Guardian, 14 January 1832, 245–46. A response to a letter from James Tucker.
- 'Special Commission - Even-handed Justice' in Poor Man's Guardian, 21 January 1832, pp. 251–52.
- 'Mr Owen and the Working Classes [2]' in Poor Man's Guardian, 21 January 1832, p. 255. This is my own title. The 'article' is a response to a letter from Benjamin Warden, in response to Hetherington's article of 14 January 1832, pp. 245–46.
- 'Search for Arms' in Poor Man's Guardian, 11 February 1832, p. 278.
- 'Police - Villany of Magistrates' in Poor Man's Guardian, 18 February 1832, p. 285.
- 'Robbery and Treachery in Support of the Militia Laws' in Poor Man's Guardian, 25 February 1832, pp. 294–95.
- 'Military Outrage at Cletheroe' in Poor Man's Guardian, 11 August 1832, pp. 489–90.
- 'Progress of the Struggle of "Right Against Might"' in Poor Man's Guardian, 19 January 1833, pp. 17–18.
- 'To Henry Hunt, Esq.' in Poor Man's Guardian, 19 January 1833, pp. 18–19. Letter dated 14 January 1833, from Clerkenwell Prison.
- 'Whig Persecution of the Press: To the Readers and Supporters of the Guardian' in Poor Man's Guardian, 23 February 1833, pp. 60–61. Letter dated 20 February 1833, from Clerkenwell Prison.
- 'Mr Hetherington's Petition to the House of Commons' in Poor Man's Guardian, 23 February 1833, p. 62.
- 'Health and Recreation of the People' in Poor Man's Guardian, 2 March 1833, pp. 70–71. Letter dated 26 February 1833, from Clerkenwell Prison.
- 'To Mr. Dallas' in Poor Man's Guardian, 30 March 1833, pp. 99–100. Letter dated 27 March 1833, from Clerkenwell Prison, in response to Dallas' letter in issue dated 23 March 1833, pp. 94–95.
- 'The Guardian and Machinery' in Poor Man's Guardian, 13 April 1833, p. 115. [No actual title, this is one given by David M. Smith]
- 'The Dorchester Labourers' in Poor Man's Guardian, 25 October 1834, p. 303. Letter dated 18 October 1834, from Tolpuddle, Dorsetshire
- 'To Mr. Richard Carlile, Editor of a Scourge [1]' in Poor Man's Guardian, 1 November 1834, pp. 308–10. Letter dated 28 October 1834, from Southampton.
- 'To Mr. Richard Carlile, Editor of a Scourge [2]' in Poor Man's Guardian, 15 November 1834, pp. 326–7.
- 'To Mr. Richard Carlile, Editor of "A Scourge" [3]' in Poor Man's Guardian, 6 December 1834, pp. 347–9. Letter dated 3 December 1834, from London.
- 'To Mr. Richard Carlile, Editor of "A Scourge" [4]' in Poor Man's Guardian, 27 December 1834, pp. 373–6. Letter dated 23 December 1834, from Colchester.
- 'Rights of Man and Wrongs of Property' in Poor Man's Guardian, 3 January 1835, pp. 380–81. Piece dated 26 December 1834, from Chelmsford.
- 'To the Friends and Supporters of an Unstamped Press' in Poor Man's Guardian, 1 August 1835, p. 625. Letter dated 1 August 1835, from Dulwich.
- 'To the Friends and Supporters of an Unstamped Press' in Poor Man's Guardian, 1 August 1835, pp. 627–30. Letter dated 5 August 1835, from Sydenham.
- 'To the Readers of the Poor Man's Guardian' in Poor Man's Guardian, 26 December 1835, pp. 793–4.
- 'Stamp Office Spy Unmasked' in The London Dispatch, 4 December 1836. p. 92.
- 'The Decrees of the Triumvirate - The Central National Association' in The London Dispatch, 9 April 1837, p. 236.
- 'Working Men's Associations' in Lovett Papers, Birmingham Central Library, Vol. 1, letter dated 9 October 1837, f.109.
- 'Treatment of Political Prisoners' in Lovett Papers, Birmingham Central Library, Vol. III, letter dated 24 October 1839, f.114.
- 'Mr Jenkins and the Halfpenny Magazine' in The Halfpenny Magazine of Entertainment and Knowledge (hereafter Halfpenny Magazine), No. 2, 9 May 1840, pp. 9–10. (This 'leader' being an untitlted introduction to the magazine, the title is that given by David M. Smith)
- 'Why and Because' in Halfpenny Magazine, No. 3, 16 May 1840, pp. 17–18.
- 'Poverty' in Halfpenny Magazine, No. 4, 23 May 1840, pp. 25–27.
- 'Enjoyment Through the Senses' in Halfpenny Magazine, No. 5, 30 May 1840, pp. 33–34.
- 'Socialism' in Halfpenny Magazine, No. 6, 6 June 1840, pp. 41–42.
- 'The Religion of Socialism' in Halfpenny Magazine, No. 7, 13 June 1840, pp. 49–51.
- 'Napoleon Bonaparte' in Halfpenny Magazine, No. 8, 20 June 1840, pp. 57–58.
- 'Napoleon Bonaparte - II' in Halfpenny Magazine, No. 9, 27 June 1840, pp. 65–67.
- 'Napoleon Boanaparte - III' in Halfpenny Magazine, No. 10, 4 July 1840, pp. 73–76.
- 'Napoleon Bonaparte - IV' in Halfpenny Magazine, No. 11, 11 July 1840, pp. 81–83.
- 'Napoleon Bonaparte - V' in Halfpenny Magazine, No. 12, 18 July 1840, pp. 89–91.
- 'Napoleon Bonaparte - VI' in Halfpenny Magazine, No. 13, 25 July 1840, pp. 97–99.
- 'Napoleon Bonaparte - VII' in Halfpenny Magazine, No. 14, 1 August 1840, pp. 105–7.
- 'Chartism - Lovett and Collins' in Halfpenny Magazine, No. 15, 8 August 1840, pp. 113–4.
- 'Napoleon Bonaparte - VIII' in Halfpenny Magazine, No. 15, 8 August 1840, pp. 114–5.
- 'The Condition of the People - The Cotton Trade' in Halfpenny Magazine, No. 16, 15 August 1840, pp. 121–3.
- 'Napoleon Bonaparte - IX' in Halfpenny Magazine, No. 16, 15 August 1840, pp. 123–4.
- 'Human Happiness' in Halfpenny Magazine, No. 17, 22 August 1840, pp. 129–32.
- 'The Condition of the People - The Three Classes' in Halfpenny Magazine, No. 18, 29 August 1840, pp. 137–9.
- 'The Condition of the People - The Dealing Class' in Halfpenny Magazine, No. 19, 5 September 1840, pp. 145–7.
- 'The Condition of the People - The Idle Class' in Halfpenny Magazine, No. 20, 12 September 1840, pp. 152–5.
- 'The Connection of Moral and Political Reform' in Halfpenny Magazine, No. 21, 19 September 1840, pp. 161–3.
- 'The Scottish Character' in Halfpenny Magazine, No. 22, 26 September 1840, pp. 169–71.
- 'The Ignorance of the Aristocracy' in Halfpenny Magazine, No. 23, 3 October 1840, pp. 177–9.
- 'Robert Owen' in Halfpenny Magazine, No. 24, 10 October 1840, pp. 185–7.
- 'The Dead Infant' in Halfpenny Magazine, No. 25, 17 October 1840, pp. 193–5.
- 'Paper Money' in Halfpenny Magazine, No. 26, 24 October 1840, pp. 201–4.
- 'Free-will and Necessity' in Halfpenny Magazine, No. 27, 31 October 1840, pp. 209–13.
- 'War' in Halfpenny Magazine, No. 28, 7 November 1840, pp. 217–20.
- 'Congress of nations' in Halfpenny Magazine, No. 29, 14 November 1840, pp. 225–7.
- 'Peers, Parsons and Peasants' in Halfpenny Magazine, No. 30, 21 November 1840, pp. 233–4.
- 'Corn, Currency and Cotton' in Halfpenny Magazine, No. 31, 28 November 1840, pp. 241–3.
- 'Tories, Whigs and Radicals' in Halfpenny Magazine, No. 32, 5 December 1840, pp. 249–51.
- 'Habit' in Halfpenny Magazine, No. 33, 12Dec 1840, pp. 257–9.
- 'Decision of Character' in Halfpenny Magazine, No. 34, 19 December 1840, pp. 263–5.
- 'Double Dealing' in Halfpenny Magazine, No. 35, 26 December 1840, pp. 273–4.
- 'Bores and Bored' in Halfpenny Magazine, No. 36, 2 January 1841, pp. 283–4.
- 'The Power of Goodness' in Halfpenny Magazine, No. 37, 9 January 1841, pp. 289–90.
- 'The Ruling Passion' in Halfpenny Magazine, No. 38, 16 January 1841, pp. 297–98.
- 'The System of Nature' in Halfpenny Magazine, No. 39, 23 January 1841, pp. 305–9.
- 'Congress of Nations [2]' in Halfpenny Magazine, No. 40, 30 January 1841, pp. 313–5.
- 'The Immortality of the Soul' in Halfpenny Magazine, No. 42, 13 February 1841, pp. 329–31.
- 'The Eternity of the Universe - Section 1' in Halfpenny Magazine, No. 45, 6 March 1841, pp. 353–4.
- 'The Eternity of the Universe - Section 2' in Halfpenny Magazine, No. 46, 13 March 1841, pp. 361–2.
- 'To the Editor of the Northern Star' in The Northern Star, 8 May 1841.
- 'To Feargus O'Connor, Esq, "One of the Aristocracy"' in The Northern Star, 12 June 1841, p. 7.
- 'Mr. O'Connor and the London Committee Men', by Hetherington and others, in The Northern Star, 10 July 1841, p. 3.
- 'Challenge to Feargus O'Connor, Esq' in The Northern Star, 18 September 1841, p. 7.
- 'To the Political and Social Reformers of the United Kingdom', by Hetherington and William Lovett, in The Northern Star, 25 September 1841, p. 6.
- 'Is Man a Free Agent, or is he Subject to a Law of Necessity?' in The Library of Reason, No. 9, c.1844, pp. 1–5. The only extant copies of this periodical are the bound 2nd edition of 1851.
- 'The Influence of Habit on the Human Character' in The Reasoner, Vol. 2, No. 29, 1847, pp. 13–16.
- 'Address of the Social Friends' Society' in The Reasoner, Vol 2, 1847, pp. 119–20.
- 'A Few Plain Words on Communism' in The Reasoner, Vol. 4, No. 97, 1848, pp. 253–56.
- 'Last Will and Testament' in The Life and Character of Henry Hetherington. Ed: George Jacob Holyoake. London: James Watson, 1849, pp. 5–6. Also reprinted in Ambrose G. Barker. Henry Hetherington. 1792–1849. Pioneer in the Freethought and working class Struggles of a Hundred Years Ago for the Freedom of the Press. London: Pioneer Press, 1938, pp. 57–60.

=== Speeches ===
During his career Hetherington made a great number of speeches, and many of these were reported in the press. The following are speeches which, by their length, can be considered a good representation of Hetherington's views, plus his ability as a speaker – in essence, they are of article length. There are numerous other occasions when Hetherington spoke at a meeting, but either he spoke only briefly or the reporter edited the speech to the extent that what remains is a short precis, and cannot provide any real information.

- 2 August 1829, in Weekly Free Press, 8 August 1829.
- 14 October 1829, in Weekly Free Press, 21 October 1829.
- 3 November 1829, in Weekly Free Press, 3 November 1829.
- 27 October 1830, in The Magazine of Useful Knowledge and Co-operative Miscellany, No. 3, 30 October 1830, p. 43.
- 4 November 1830, in The Magazine of Useful Knowledge and Co-operative Miscellany, No. 4, 13 November 1830, p. 59.
- 10 January 1831, in Penny Papers for the People, 15 January 1831, p. 6.
- 21 March 1831, in Penny Papers for the People, 26 March 1831, pp. 7–8.
- 11 April 1831, in Republican; or, Voice of the People, 16 April 1831, pp. 15–16.
- 16 May 1831, in Republican; or, Voice of the People, 21 May 1831, pp. 2–4.
- 25 July 1831, in Coventry Herald and Observer, 29 July 1831, p. 4.
- 8 August 1831, in Poor Man's Guardian, 27 August 1831, pp. 61–62.
- 14 September 1831, in Poor Man's Guardian, 17 September 1831, pp. 86–87.
- 19 March 1832, in Poor Man's Guardian, 24 March 1832, pp. 322–3.
- 26 March 1832, in Poor Man's Guardian, 31 March 1832, p. 330.
- 2 April 1832, in Poor Man's Guardian, 7 April 1832, p. 339.
- 25 June 1832, in Poor Man's Guardian, 30 June 1832, p. 442.
- 30 June 1832, in The Political Unionist, 2 July 1832, p. 16; Also in Poor Man's Guardian, 4 August 1832, p. 482.
- 9 October 1832, in Brighton Herald, 13 October 1832.
- 31 October 1832, in Henry Hunt, Lecture on the Conduct of the Whigs, to the Working Classes, delivered at Lawrence Street Chapel, Birmingham, on Wednesday, 31 October 1832. London: William Strange, 1832, p. 6.
- 1 July 1833, in Poor Man's Guardian, 6 July 1833, pp. 215–17.
- 23 September 1833, in Weekly True Sun, 6 October 1833, p. 2.
- 2 December 1833, in Poor Man's Guardian, 7 December 1833, p. 393.
- 13 July 1836, in Lovett Papers, Birmingham Central Library, Vol. I, f.5.
- 5 December 1836, in Lovett Papers, Birmingham Central Library, Vol. I, f.14.
- Oct 1837, in Lovett Papers, Birmingham Central Library, Vol. I, f.53.
- Nov 1837, in Lovett Papers, Birmingham Central Library, Vol. I, ff.136-7.
- 12 December 1837, in Birmingham Journal, 16 December 1837, p. 3; Also in Lovett Papers, Birmingham Central Library, Vol. II, ff.153-4.
- 17 September 1838, in The Northern Star, 22 September 1838, pp. 2–3; Also in Lovett Papers, Birmingham Central Library, Vol. II, 242–3; Also in The Times, 18 September 1838.
- 11 April 1839, in The Northern Star, 20 April 1839, p. 6.
- 22 April 1839, in The Northern Star, 27 April 1839, p. 1.
- 25 April 1839, in Lovett Papers, Birmingham Central Library, Vol. II, f.360, same as Vol. III, ff.1-2.
- Late April 1839, in Shrewsbury Chronicle, 3 May 1839; Also in The Times, 6 May 1839, p. 5.
- 28 December 1842, in The Northern Star, 31 December 1841.
- 10 June 1844, in The Movement, 22 June 1844, pp. 220–22. Also see Ambrose G. Barker. Henry Hetherington. 1792-1849. Pioneer in the Freethought and Working Class Struggles of a Hundred Years Ago for the Freedom of the Press. London: Pioneer Press, 1938, pp. 43–46.
- 27 August 1844, in The Movement, 7 September 1844, pp. 323–25
- 15 November 1844, in The Movement, 27 November 1844, pp. 433–34.
- 19 June 1849, in The Northern Star, 23 June 1849, p. 5.
- 30 July 1849, in The Northern Star, 4 August 1849, p. 1.
