= Cleave's Weekly Police Gazette =

Cleave's Weekly Police Gazette (also known by contemporaries simply as the Weekly Police Gazette) was a British weekly newspaper published by John Cleave between 1834 and 1836. It was "one of the first and most popular unstamped newspapers to mix political news with coverage of non-political events like sensational crimes, strange occurrences, and excerpts from popular fiction".

Cleave published the newspaper from his bookshop in Shoe Lane, London. Priced at 1d., the newspaper was selling 40,000 copies a week by 1836. Cleave was imprisoned for refusing to pay stamp duty on his publications; his fines were partly paid by the Association of Working Men to Procure a Cheap and Honest Press, which later became the Working Men's Association. In 1836 the newspaper merged with Henry Hetherington's London Dispatch. Cleave went on to found Cleave's London Satirist and Gazette of Variety the following year.
