= National Charter Association =

Former english charter association

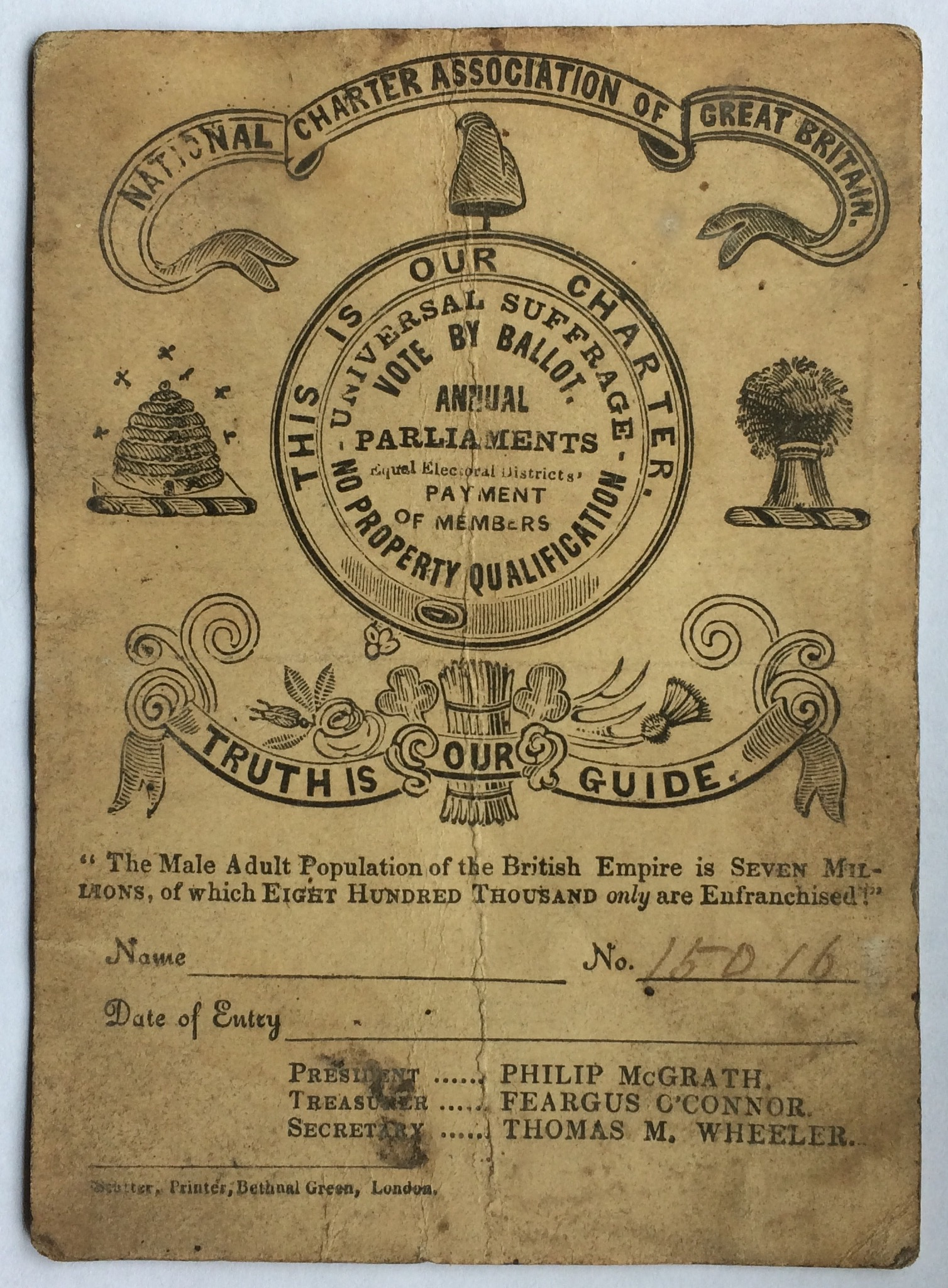
- Abbreviation: NCA
- Leader: Feargus O'Connor
- President: James Leach
- Secretary: Robert Lowery; John Campbell
- Founded: July 20, 1840
- Dissolved: February 1858
- Headquarters: Manchester
- Newspaper: Northern Star
- Ideology: Chartism
- Political position: Left-wing
- International affiliation: International Association

The National Charter Association (NCA) (1840-1858) was formed on July 20, 1840, in a conference chaired by James Leach, of twenty three Chartist delegates in Manchester.

== Origin ==
The NCA was formed in response to the decline of the Chartist position. In 1839, many of the Chartist leadership had been imprisoned or exiled and the formation of the NCA was intended to restructure Chartist groups into one body. The establishment of the NCA and its national executive paved the way for a more structured kind of working-class organisation, one which included membership fees and elected representatives; therefore in historiography it has often been described as one of the world’s first mass political parties to exist that had a large working-class membership.

After the formation of the NCA, each Chartist locality put forward its own nominees for the general council, this allowed the NCA to become an undivided body of several hundred members, which permitted the NCA to stay within the law and effectively bypass the Unlawful Societies Act. Membership of the NCA was open to both men and women who agreed with its objective to obtain radical reform of the House of Commons.

In 1841, a year after its formation, many local Chartist and Working Men's Associations were drawn to the NCA due to its revised and now legal constitution; in conjunction with its formation, a mechanism became available through which these associations could subscribe to the Chartist movement. Furthermore, by December 1841 there were 282 localities with 13,000 members; by April 1842, its membership rose rapidly with 50,000 members and 401 localities.
