= International Association (1855) =

Socialist political international

- Abbreviation: IA
- Founder: Ernest Jones
- Founded: February 1855 (as the IC); 10 August 1856 (as the IA)
- Dissolved: 1861
- Preceded by: Fraternal Democrats
- Succeeded by: International Workingmen's Association
- Headquarters: London
- Ideology: Internationalism; Revolutionary socialism; Factions: Chartism; Communism; Feminism; Nationalism
- Political position: Left-wing

The International Association (IA), established in 1855 as the International Committee (IC), was a left-wing political international that advocated for social revolution and the abolition of class stratification. It brought together representatives from several different nations, including the French Revolutionary Commune (CR), the German Workers Educational Association (DABV), the British National Charter Association (NCA) and the Polish Revolutionary Society (GRP).

== Background ==
Following the Revolutions of 1848, thousands of political refugees from throughout Europe fled political repression in their home countries and sought asylum in London. In the United Kingdom, these refugees were extended civil liberties such as freedom of assembly and freedom of the press, which they used to hold meetings and publish radical publications throughout the early 1850s. The Fraternal Democrats, an international organisation founded by British radicals that had brought together many of these polticial refugees, struggled to handle the turmoil of 1848 and ultimately dissolved in 1854.

== History ==
=== Establishment ===
After Armand Barbès was pardoned by Napoleon III and subsequently fled into exile, in the autumn of 1854, British Chartists led by Ernest Jones established a "Welcome and Protest Committee" to respectively welcome Barbès to Britain and protest Napoleon's upcoming state visit to the country. When neither Barbès nor Bonaparte ultimately travelled to Britain, the Chartists took the opportunity to expand the scope of the organisation, reorienting the committee to establishing connections with other European democrats. On 21 January 1855, they decided to organise a meeting for the anniversary of the French Revolution of 1848, during which they would establish a political international for democrats of different nationalities. In February 1855, this committee formed the nucleus for the creation of the International Committee (IC), which brought together representatives from Britain, France, Germany, Italy, Poland and Spain, with the intention of coordinating revolutionaries of different countries in a single political international.

On 10 August 1856, members of the IC held a meeting at the John Street Institution; there they established the International Association (IA), a political international dedicated to the abolition of class stratification through social revolution. The IA brought together organisations from four different nations: the French socialists of the Revolutionary Commune (French: Commune révolutionnaire; CR), led by Félix Pyat; German communists of the German Workers Educational Association (German: Deutscher Arbeiterbildungsverein; DABV), led by Karl Schapper; British Chartists of the National Charter Association (NCA), led by Ernest Jones; and Polish nationalists of the Polish Revolutionary Society (Polish: Gromada Rewolucyjna Polska; GRP), led by Ludwik Oborski. The IA also established a section in the United States, where German and French exiles set up branches in Boston, Chicago, Cincinnati and New York.

=== Activities ===
The IA hosted celebrations to mark the anniversaries of various revolutionary events in history, including the establishment of the French First Republic (21 September 1792), the November Uprising (29 November 1830), the February Revolution (24 February 1848) and the June Days uprising (22 June 1848).

=== Dissolution ===
By the end of the 1850s, the IA was experiencing a marked decline. In 1858, the National Charter Association held its last convention and, the following year, its leadership merged into the newly established Liberal Party. In 1859, after Napoleon III proclaimed a general amnesty, many of the IA's French members withdrew and returned to their home country. In 1861, the Kingdom of Prussia also proclaimed an amnesty, and the IA's German members likewise left for their home country.

== Ideology ==
The International Association's ultimate objective was the overthrow the existing order of class stratification in a social revolution. It was opposed to the nationalism and class collaboration, associated with Giuseppe Mazzini's interpretation of internationalism. The IA also advocated for full gender equality; one member, the French feminist Jeanne Deroin, argued that no true democrat could object to gender equality. The IA was anti-capitalist at its core and called for solidarity between working people although not all its members agreed on the specifics of its socialist programme.

== Organization ==
The executive organ of the IA was its Central Council, which published the IA's bulletin. The IA allowed women to join as members, which was a rarity at the time.

== Legacy ==
According to Arthur Lehning, the International Association was "the first international organization of a proletarian and socialist character, and forms the last and most important link in the series of international manifestations during the three decades prior to the foundation of the First International." In contrast, Henry Collins and Chimen Abramsky pointed out that the IA was relatively small, short-lived and uninfluential, describing it more as a "herald of the future than a thing of actual flesh and blood". Although the IA's influence during its own time was limited, many of its members went on to join the International Workingmen's Association (IWMA), which was established in London in 1863.

== Bibliography ==
- Bensimon, Fabrice (2018). "The IWMA and Its Precursors in London, c. 1830–1860" (PDF). "Arise Ye Wretched of the Earth": The First International in a Global Perspective. pp. 21–38. doi:10.1163/9789004335462_003. ISBN 9789004335462. OCLC 10023109880.
- Collins, Henry; Abramsky, Chimen (1965). Karl Marx and the British Labour Movement: Years of the First International. London: Macmillan. OCLC 802881640.
- Lehning, Arthur Mueller (1938). "The International Association (1855-1859): a Contribution to the Preliminary History of the First International". International Review for Social History. 3: 185–284. doi:10.1017/S187308410000032X. ISSN 0020-8590.
- Stekloff, G. M. (1968) [1928]. "Harbingers of The International". History of The First International. Translated by Paul, Eden; Paul, Cedar. Russell & Russell. pp. 13–33. OCLC 268772.
