= James Watson (Chartist) =

English radical publisher, activist and Chartist (1799–1874)

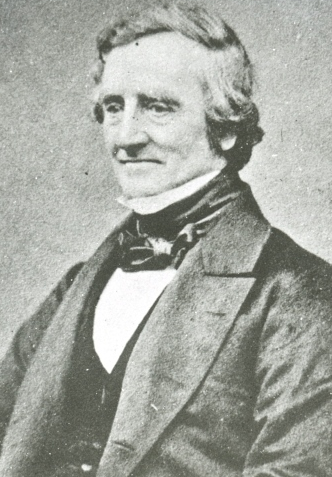
- Born: 21 September 1799
- Died: 29 November 1874 (aged 75)
- Occupations: Chartist, radical publisher, writer

James Watson (21 September 1799 – 29 November 1874) was an English radical publisher, activist and Chartist. His colleagues in political activity included Henry Hetherington, William Lovett, Thomas Wakley, Thomas Slingsby Duncombe, and Thomas Cooper.

== Early life ==
He was born at Malton, North Yorkshire, on 21 September 1799. His father died when he was only a year old. His mother, who was a Sunday school teacher, taught him to read and write. Around the year of 1811, she returned to domestic service in the household of a clergyman, who had paid for James's schooling and tuitions for a brief period. He had worked there as under-gardener, in the stables and as house-servant, and he read widely. From about 1817 Watson was with his mother in Leeds, where he became a warehouseman.

== In London ==
Watson was converted to freethought and radicalism by public readings from William Cobbett and Richard Carlile. He spread literature and helped with a subscription on behalf of Carlile. Carlile was sentenced in 1821 to three years' imprisonment for blasphemy, and Watson went up to London in September 1822 to serve as a volunteer assistant in his Water Lane bookshop. In January 1823 Carlile's wife, having completed her own term of imprisonment, took a new shop at 201 Strand, and Watson moved there as a salesman; salesman after salesman was arrested. In February 1823 Watson was charged with selling a copy of Elihu Palmer's Principles of Nature to a police agent, spoke in his own defence, and was sent to Coldbath Fields Prison for a year.

In prison he read David Hume, Edward Gibbon, and Johann Lorenz von Mosheim's Ecclesiastical History, and developed his anti-Christian and republican opinions. In 1825 he trained as a compositor, and was employed in printing Carlile's The Republican; and went into business on his own. He was in poverty at times, and in 1826 caught cholera. Recovering, he became an Owenite, and in 1828 he was storekeeper of the "First Co-operative Trading Association" in London, in Red Lion Square.

== Publisher ==
In 1831 Watson set up as a printer and publisher. He became a champion of the right to free expression of opinion. Julian Hibbert, an admirer, died in January 1834 and left him a legacy, with which Watson enlarged his printing plant. He started by printing the life and works of Tom Paine, and these volumes were followed by Mirabaud's System of Nature and Volney's Ruins. Later he printed Lord Byron's Cain and The Vision of Judgment, Percy Bysshe Shelley's Queen Mab and The Masque of Anarchy, and Clark on the Miracles of Christ. These book were printed, corrected, folded, and sewed by Watson himself, and issued at one shilling or less per volume. He cared for the appearance of his books, on which he lost money.

In 1832 Watson was arrested, but escaped imprisonment, for organising a procession and a feast on the day the government had ordained a "general fast" on account of the cholera epidemic. In February 1833 he was summoned at Bow Street for selling Henry Hetherington's Poor Man's Guardian, and was sentenced to six months' imprisonment at Clerkenwell. His shop was near Bunhill Fields; he then moved first to City Road, and in 1843 to 5 Paul's Alley.

He married Eleanor Byerley, on 3 June 1834, and two months later was arrested and imprisoned for six months for having circulated Hetherington's unstamped paper, ironically entitled The Conservative. He had come under the observation of the government as a leader of the meeting of trade unions in April of that, in favour of the action of the Dorchester labourers. This was his last imprisonment, though he continued to issue books banned by the government.

== Chartist ==
In June 1837 Watson was on the committee appointed to draw up the bills embodying the Chartist demands. He was opposed to the violence of some of the agitators, and, on the other hand, to the overtures made to Whig partisans, whom he denounced. He was averse to "peddling away the people's birthright for any mess of cornlaw pottage".

Watson corresponded with Giuseppe Mazzini, and in 1847 joined his Peoples' International League. In 1848 he was one of the conveners of the first public meeting to congratulate the French Revolution of 1848.

== Later life ==
An untaxed and absolutely free press became his main object in later years. He died at Burns College, Hamilton Road, Lower Norwood, on 29 November 1874, and was buried in Norwood cemetery. A grey granite obelisk erected by friends commemorated his "brave efforts to secure the rights of free speech". A photographic portrait was in the Memoir by William James Linton.
