= The Poor Man's Guardian =

English periodical

The Poor Man's Guardian was a penny weekly newspaper published in London, England by Henry Hetherington from July 1831 to December 1835.

Hetherington published his Poor Man's Guardian, a successor to his earlier (1830–31) penny daily Penny Papers for the People, as an outright challenge to authority. Published at the low price of a penny per weekly copy it bore the explicit heading: Published contrary to 'law' to try the power of 'might' against 'right'.

The paper represented a fight against the consequences of the Six Acts of 1819, imposed by the Tories. The Acts aimed to combat the free, radicalized press seen as representative of a period of radicalism from 1816, which continued until 1820. They imposed a stamped (taxed) press; all publications appearing at less than 26-day intervals had to bear a government stamp and retail at 7d (3p) each. The Poor Man's Guardian was hugely influential upon the decision by the Whig government of Lord Melbourne to lower the tax to a point where newspapers could retail at 4d (1.5p).

The paper claimed that the newspaper stamp was a tax on knowledge; it had the significant motto 'Knowledge is power'. Hetherington's paper was enormously successful and achieved sales of 15,000 copies a week all over the country despite being London-based. Bronterre O'Brien, later a regular contributor to the Northern Star, edited the Poor Man's Guardian from 1832.
