= London Working Men's Association =

19th-century British socialist organisation

- Abbreviation: LWMA
- Founder: William Lovett; Francis Place; Henry Hetherington
- Founded: 1836
- Headquarters: London
- Ideology: Chartism; Owenism; Socialism
- Political position: Left-wing
- International affiliation: Democratic Friends of all Nations

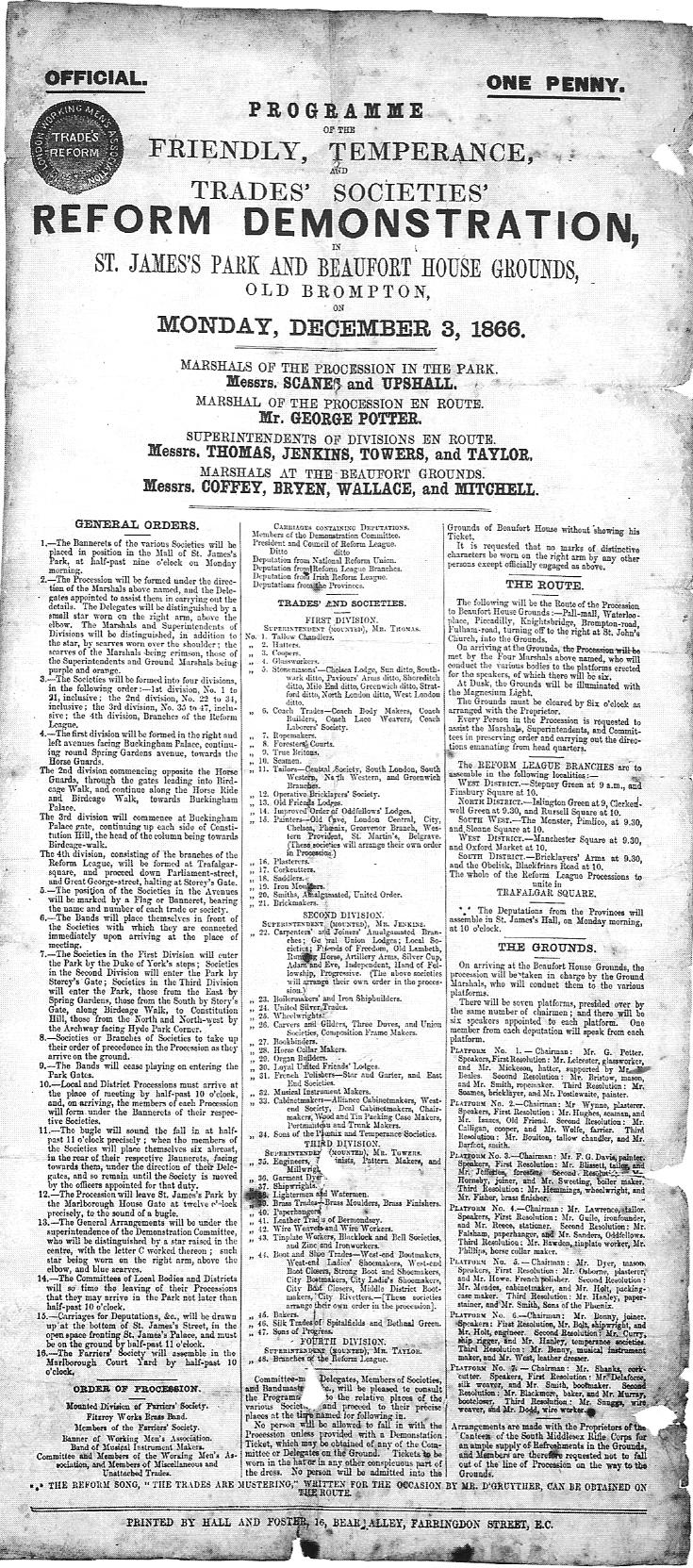
Programme issued by the London Working Men's Association for a Reform Demonstration in 1866.

The London Working Men's Association was an organisation established in London in 1836. It was one of the foundations of Chartism, advocating for universal male suffrage, equally-populated electoral districts, the abolition of property qualifications for MPs, annual Parliaments, the payment of MPs, and the establishment of secret ballot voting. The founders were William Lovett, Francis Place and Henry Hetherington. They appealed to skilled workers rather than the mass of unskilled factory labourers. They were associated with Owenite socialism and the movement for general education.
