= William Lovett =

British activist (1800–1877)

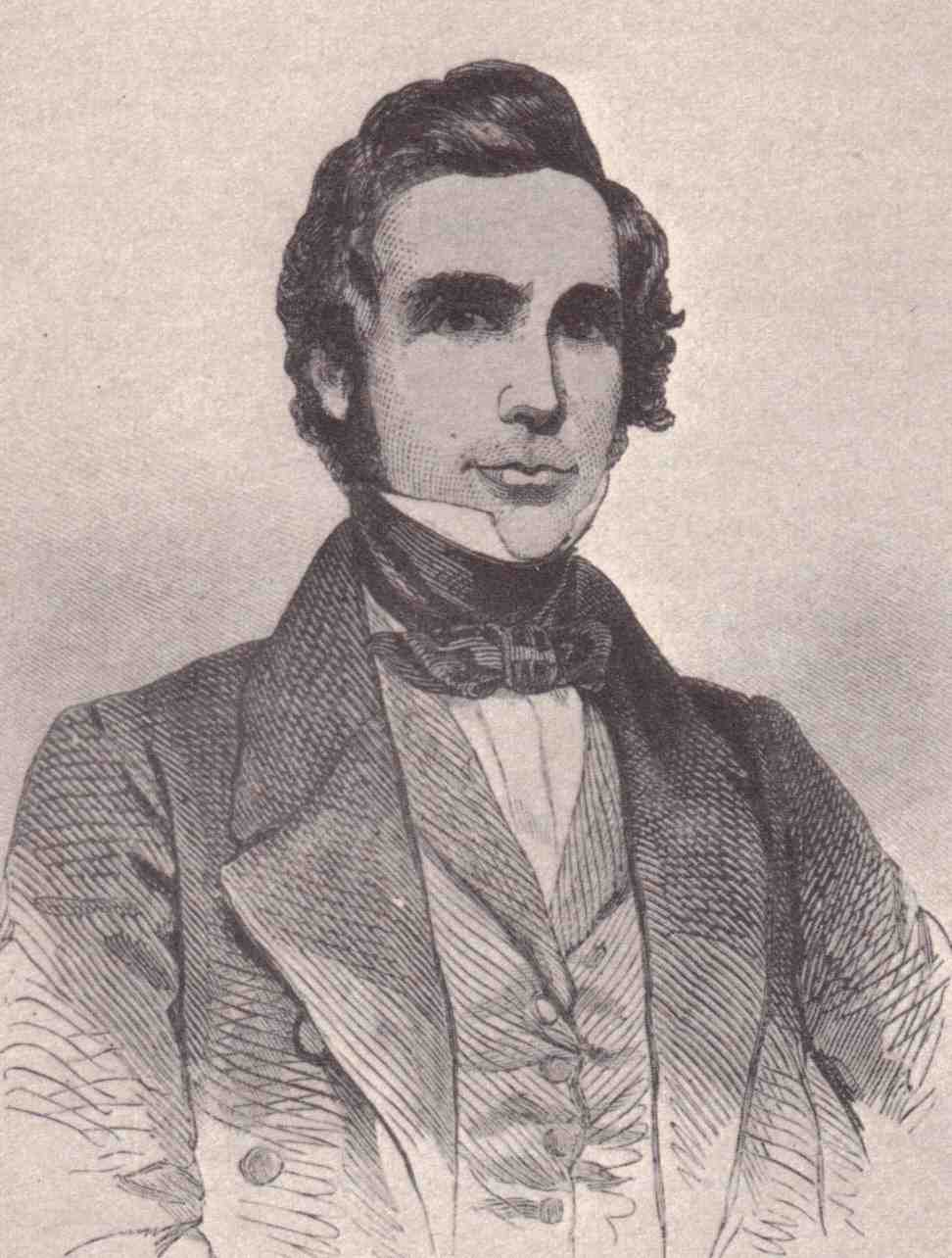
- Born: May 8, 1800; Newlyn
- Died: August 8, 1877 (aged 77); London
- Burial place: Highgate Cemetery
- Occupation: Political activist
- Organization: London Working Men's Association

William Lovett (8 May 1800 – 8 August 1877) was a British activist and leader of the Chartist political movement. He was one of the leading London-based artisan radicals of his generation.

== Biography ==
=== Early activism ===
Born in the Cornish town of Newlyn in 1800, Lovett moved to London as a young man seeking work as a cabinet maker. He was self-educated, became a member of the Cabinetmakers Society, and later its President. He rose to national political prominence as founder of the Anti-Militia Association (slogan: 'no vote, no musket'), and was active in wider trade unionism through the Metropolitan Trades Union and Owenite socialism. In 1831, during the Reform Act agitation, he helped form the National Union of the Working Classes with radical colleagues Henry Hetherington and James Watson. After the passage of the Reform Act 1832 he turned, with Hetherington, to the campaign to repeal taxes on newspapers known as the War of the Unstamped.

=== The London Working Men's Association ===
In June 1836 Lovett founded the London Working Men's Association with several radical colleagues including Hetherington. The LWMA's membership was restricted to 100 working men, although it admitted 35 honorary members including the later Chartist leader Feargus O'Connor. Other honorary members included radical MP's, but the LWMA was strictly a working-class organisation, unlike groups such as the Birmingham Political Union, whose executive was dominated by the middle-class. The original purpose of the LWMA was education, but in 1838 Lovett and fellow Radical Francis Place drafted a parliamentary bill which was the foundation of the Peoples' Charter, and the Association was effectively sidetracked into Chartism. The Bill was signed by Lovett and five other LWMA members, along with six Radical MPs including Daniel O'Connell.

Lovett is best known for his role in the Chartist movement. Chartism, a campaign for parliamentary reforms intended to correct inequities remaining after the Reform Act 1832, spanned roughly 1838 to 1850.

=== Arrest and prison term ===
Like most leading Chartists, Lovett was arrested. In February 1839 the first Chartist Convention met in London, and on 4 February 1839 unanimously elected Lovett as its Secretary. On 13 May 1839 the Convention moved to Birmingham. Many supporters gathered in the city's Bull Ring, but local authorities had prohibited assembly there, and several were arrested. The Convention condemned the actions of police in breaking up the "riot" and posted placards which described the police who put down the riot as a "bloodthirsty and unconstitutional force". Lovett, as secretary, accepted responsibility for the placards, and was arrested along with John Collins, who had taken the placards to a printer. Lovett and Collins were later found guilty of seditious libel, and were sentenced to twelve months imprisonment in Warwick Gaol. They were released in July 1840.

=== The New life ===
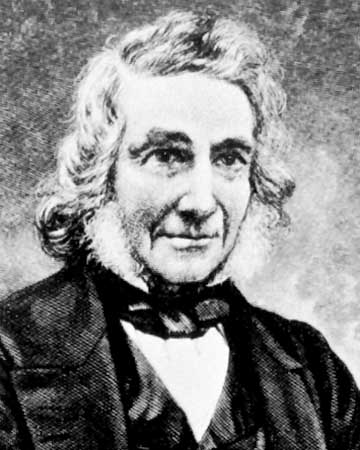
An older Lovett.

While in prison Lovett, with Collins, wrote "Chartism, a New Organisation of the People", which focused on Chartist Education. Once released Lovett retired from politics, and in 1841 formed the National Association for Promoting the Political and Social Improvement of the People, an educational body. The body was to implement his New Move educational initiative, through which he hoped poor workers and their children would be able to better themselves. The New Move was to be funded through a 1 penny per week subscription paid by those Chartists who had signed the national petition. Hetherington and Place supported the move, but O'Connor opposed the scheme in the Northern Star, believing it would distract Chartists from the main aim of having the petition implemented. The New Move was unable to generate the popular support that Lovett had hoped for. Membership never surpassed 500, and education was limited to Sunday schools. The National Association Hall was opened in 1842 but closed in 1857 when the operation was evicted. In the 1851 Census Lovett described himself as a school teacher and in the 1861 and 1871 Censuses, a teacher of physiology.

== Beliefs ==
Lovett was a moral-force Chartist and decried the use or threat of violence to achieve political change. He believed in temperance, and was a staunch advocate of sobriety. Against the educational standards of the time, he believed in teaching methods founded on kindness and compassion.

== Personal life ==
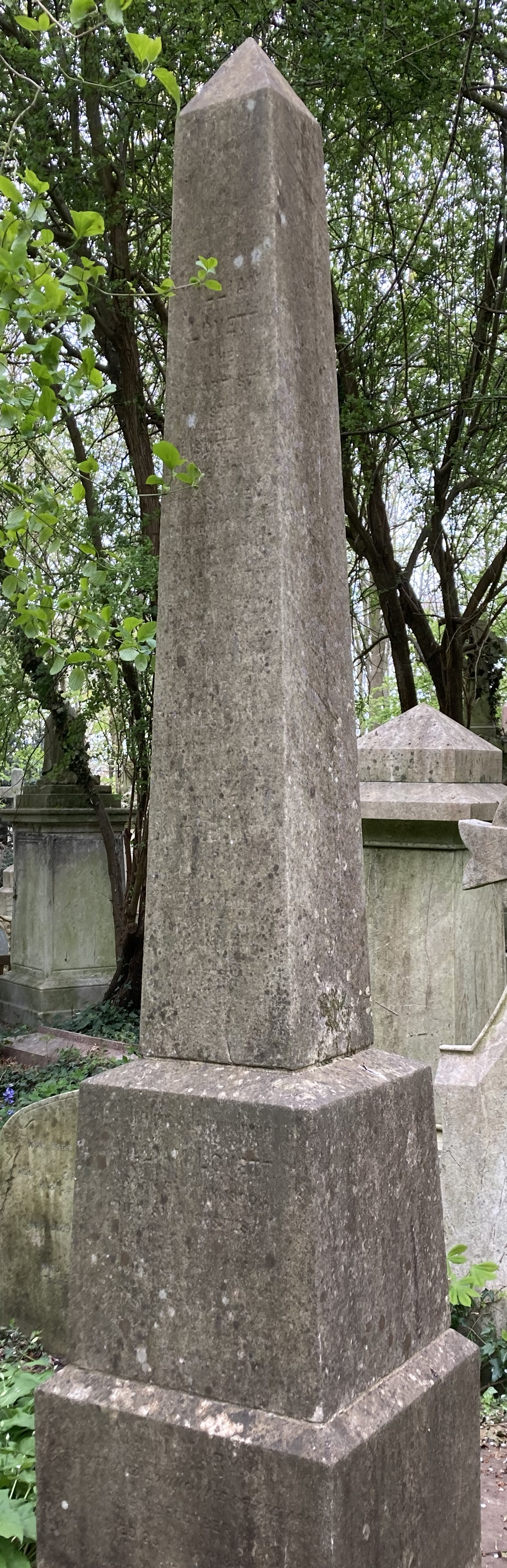
Grave of William Lovett in Highgate Cemetery

Lovett's father drowned before he was born.

He married Mary Solly from Pegwell, Kent in 1826, and she was a great support to him in his work. They had two daughters.

In later years Lovett opened a bookshop, and completed his autobiography, The Life and Struggles of William Lovett, in 1877.

He died impoverished on 8 August 1877 and was buried on the western side of Highgate Cemetery. His grave is now a grade II listed monument.
