= Chartism =

British working-class movement (1838–1857)

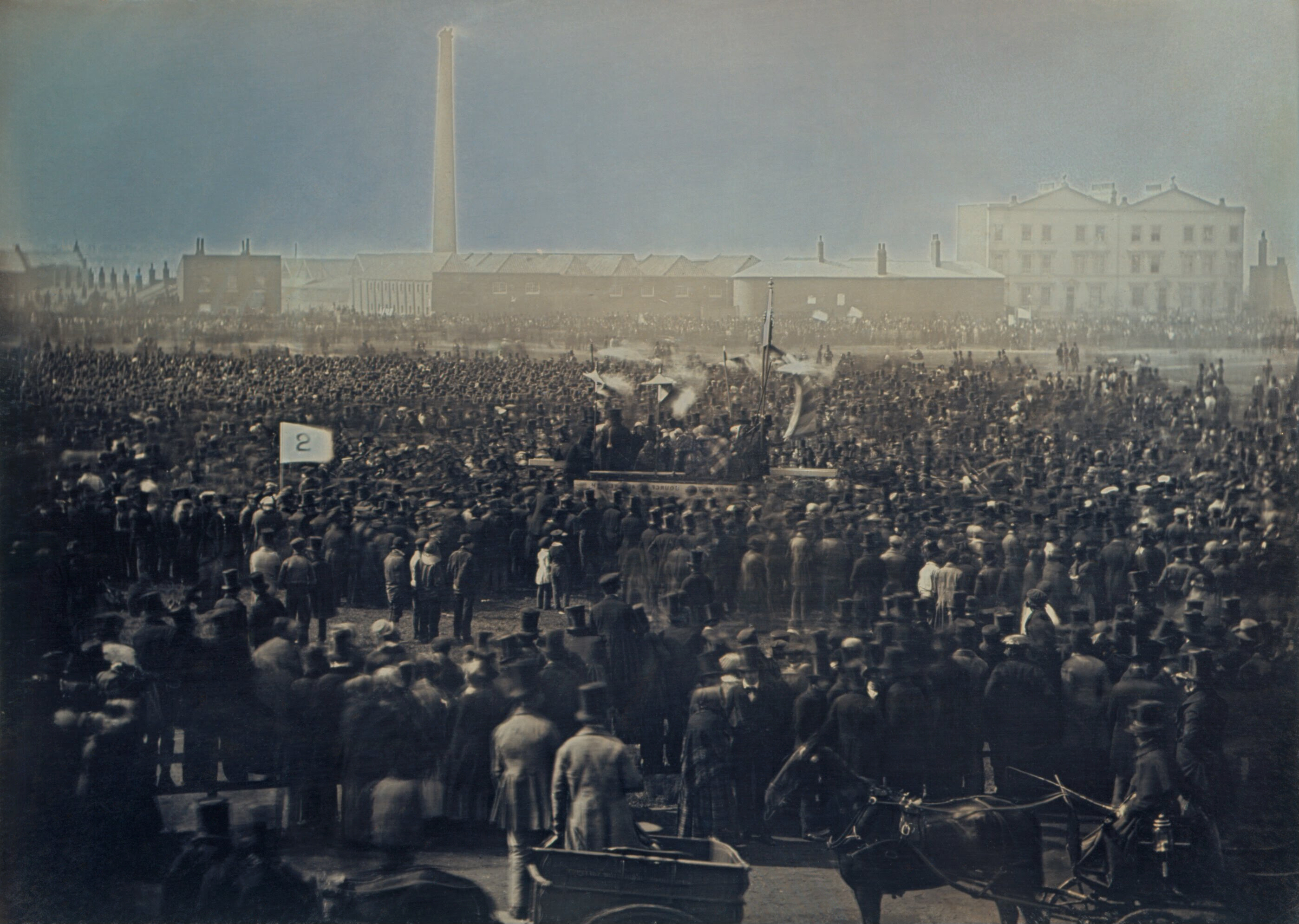
A photograph of the Great Chartist Meeting on Kennington Common, London, 1848

Chartism was a working-class movement for political reform in the United Kingdom that lasted from 1838 to 1857 and was strongest in 1839, 1842 and 1848. It took its name from the People's Charter of 1838 and was a national protest movement, with particular strongholds of support in Northern England, the East Midlands, the Staffordshire Potteries, the Black Country and the South Wales Valleys, where working people depended on single industries and were subject to wild swings in economic activity. Chartism was less strong in places such as Bristol, that had more diversified economies. The movement was fiercely opposed by government authorities, which finally suppressed it.

Support for the movement was at its highest when petitions signed by millions of working people were presented to the House of Commons. The strategy employed was to use the scale of support which these petitions and the accompanying mass meetings demonstrated to put pressure on politicians to concede universal manhood suffrage. Chartism thus relied on constitutional methods to secure its aims, though some became involved in insurrectionist activities, notably in South Wales and in Yorkshire.

The People's Charter called for six reforms to make the political system more democratic:

- A vote for every man aged twenty-one years and above, of sound mind, and not undergoing punishment for a crime.
- The secret ballot to protect the elector in the exercise of his vote.
- No property qualification for Members of Parliament (MPs), to allow the constituencies to return the man of their choice.
- Payment of Members, enabling tradesmen, working men, or other persons of modest means to leave or interrupt their livelihood to attend to the interests of the nation.
- Equal constituencies, securing the same amount of representation for the same number of electors, instead of allowing less populous constituencies to have as much or more weight than larger ones.
- Annual parliamentary elections, thus presenting the most effectual check to bribery and intimidation, since no purse could buy a constituency under a system of universal manhood suffrage in every twelve months.

Eventually, after Chartism died out, Britain adopted all but the last of these six reforms. Chartists saw themselves fighting against political corruption and for democracy in an industrial society, but attracted support beyond the radical political groups for economic reasons, such as opposing wage cuts and unemployment.

== Origin ==
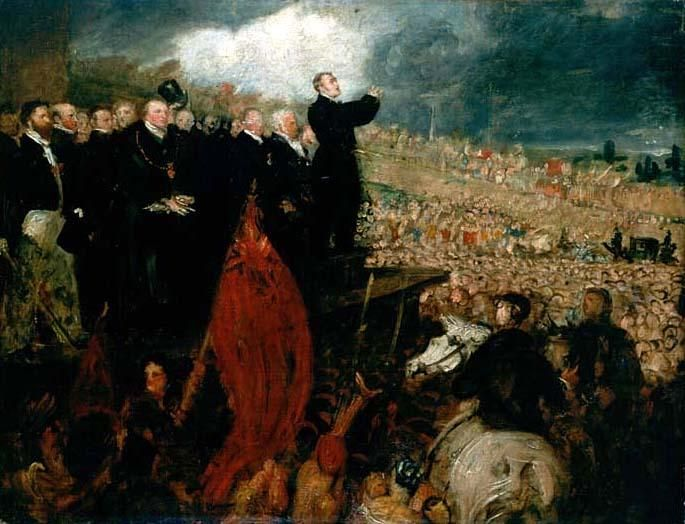
The meeting of the Birmingham Political Union on 16 May 1832, attended by 200,000

Along with Luddism (a workers' movement contemporary to Chartism, whose focus of attack was the machines with which the workers worked), Chartism is considered as a movement of the first stage of the workers' movement, although, unlike Luddism, its essence was eminently political.

After the passing of the Reform Act 1832, which failed to extend the vote beyond those owning property, the political leaders of the working class made speeches claiming that there had been a great act of betrayal. This sense that the working class had been betrayed by the middle class was strengthened by the actions of the Whig governments of the 1830s. Notably, the hated new Poor Law Amendment was passed in 1834, depriving working people of outdoor relief and driving the poor into workhouses, where families were separated.

The massive wave of opposition to this measure in the north of England in the late 1830s made Chartism a mass movement. It seemed that only securing the vote for working men would change things. Dorothy Thompson, the preeminent historian of Chartism, defines the movement as the time when "thousands of working people considered that their problems could be solved by the political organization of the country." In 1836, the London Working Men's Association was founded by William Lovett and Henry Hetherington, providing a platform for Chartists in the southeast. The origins of Chartism in Wales can be traced to the foundation in the autumn of 1836 of Carmarthen Working Men's Association.

The English Industrial Revolution is one of the most important processes in contemporary history, resulting in a gradual but profound series of changes at all levels. Technological innovations enabled the introduction of machinery—which replaced human labor— and gave rise to the factory system, as well as the consolidation of industrial capitalism.

W. Lovett and Robert Owen, who were more moderate, had more economic aims and advocated for the organization of production cooperatives and the elimination of intermediaries. They sought to reach an understanding with the middle classes.

=== Press ===
Both nationally and locally a Chartist press thrived in the form of periodicals, which were important to the movement for their news, editorials, poetry and especially in 1848, reports on international developments. They reached a huge audience. The Poor Man's Guardian in the 1830s, edited by Henry Hetherington, dealt with questions of class solidarity, manhood suffrage, property, and temperance, and condemned the Reform Act 1832. The paper explored the rhetoric of violence versus nonviolence, or what its writers called moral versus physical force.

It was succeeded as the voice of radicalism by an even more famous paper: the Northern Star and Leeds General Advertiser. The Star was published between 1837 and 1852, and in 1839 was the best-selling provincial newspaper in Britain, with a circulation of 50,000. Like other Chartist papers, it was often read aloud in coffeehouses, workplaces and the open air. Other Chartist periodicals included the Northern Liberator (1837–40), English Chartist Circular (1841–43), and the Midland Counties' Illuminator (1841). The papers gave justifications for the demands of the People's Charter, accounts of local meetings, commentaries on education and temperance and a great deal of poetry. They also advertised upcoming meetings, typically organised by local grassroots branches, held either in public houses or their halls.

Research of the distribution of Chartist meetings in London that were advertised in the Northern Star shows that the movement was not uniformly spread across the metropolis but clustered in the West End, where a group of Chartist tailors had shops, as well as in Shoreditch in the east, and relied heavily on pubs that also supported local friendly societies. Readers also found denunciations of imperialism—the First Opium War (1839–42) was condemned—and of the arguments of free traders about the civilizing and pacifying influences of free trade.

== People's Charter of 1838 ==
In 1837, six Members of Parliament (MPs) and six working men, including William Lovett, from the London Working Men's Association, set up in 1836, formed a committee. In 1838, they published the People's Charter. This set out the movement's six main aims. The achievement of these aims would give working men a say in lawmaking: they would be able to vote, their vote would be protected by a secret ballot, and they would be able to stand for election to the House of Commons as a result of the removal of property qualifications and the introduction of payment for MPs. None of these demands were new, but the People's Charter became one of the most famous political manifestos of 19th-century Britain.

== Beginnings ==
Chartists' riots

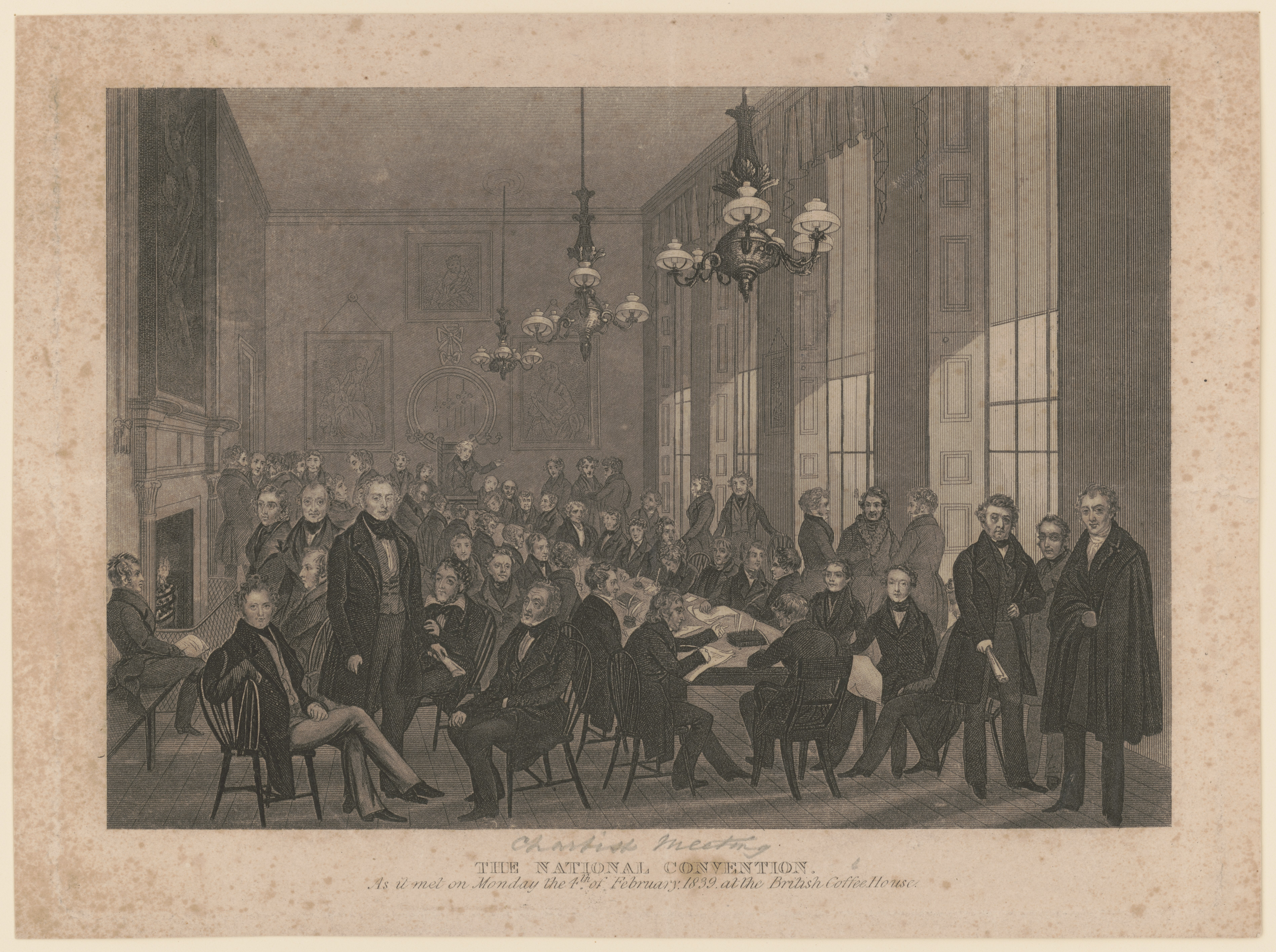
The national convention, meeting on Monday 4 February 1839, at the British Coffee House

Chartism was launched in 1838 by a series of large-scale meetings in Birmingham, Glasgow and the north of England. A huge mass meeting was held on Kersal Moor near Salford, Lancashire, on 24 September 1838 with speakers from all over the country. Speaking in favour of manhood suffrage, Joseph Rayner Stephens declared that Chartism was a "knife and fork, a bread and cheese question". These words indicate the importance of economic factors in the launch of Chartism. If, as the movement came together, there were different priorities amongst local leaders, the Charter and the Star soon created a national, and largely united, campaign of national protest. John Bates, an activist, recalled:

There were [radical] associations all over the county, but there was a great lack of cohesion. One wanted the ballot, another manhood suffrage and so on ... The radicals were without unity of aim and method, and there was but little hope of accomplishing anything. When, however, the People's Charter was drawn up ... clearly defining the urgent demands of the working class, we felt we had a real bond of union; and so transformed our Radical Association into local Chartist centres ...

The movement organised a National Convention in London in early 1839 to facilitate the presentation of the first petition. Delegates used the term MC, Member of Convention, to identify themselves; the convention undoubtedly saw itself as an alternative parliament. In June 1839, the petition, signed by 1.3 million working people, was presented to the House of Commons, but MPs voted, by a large majority, not to hear the petitioners. At the Convention, there was talk of a general strike or "sacred month". In the West Riding of Yorkshire and in south Wales, anger went even deeper, and underground preparations for a rising were undoubtedly made.

=== Newport Rising ===
Dramatisation of the trial of the Chartists at Shire Hall, Monmouth, including background information

Several outbreaks of violence ensued, leading to arrests and trials. One of the leaders of the movement, John Frost, on trial for treason, claimed in his defence that he had toured his territory of industrial Wales urging people not to break the law, although he was himself guilty of using language that some might interpret as a call to arms. William Price of Llantrisant—more of a maverick than a mainstream Chartist—described Frost as putting "a sword in my hand and a rope around my neck".

Unsurprisingly, there are no surviving letters outlining plans for insurrection, but Chartists had undoubtedly started organising physical force. By early autumn men were being drilled and armed in south Wales and the West Riding. Secret cells were set up, covert meetings were held in the Chartist Caves at Llangynidr and weapons were manufactured as the Chartists armed themselves. Behind closed doors and in pub back rooms, plans were drawn up for a mass protest.

On the night of 3–4 November 1839 Frost led several thousand marchers through South Wales to the Westgate Hotel, Newport, Monmouthshire, where there was a confrontation. It seems that Frost and other local leaders were expecting to seize the town and trigger a national uprising. The result of the Newport Rising was a disaster for Chartism. The hotel was occupied by armed soldiers. A brief, violent, and bloody battle ensued. Shots were fired by both sides, although most contemporaries agree that the soldiers holding the building had vastly superior firepower. The Chartists were forced to retreat in disarray: more than twenty were killed, at least another fifty wounded.

Testimonies exist from contemporaries, such as the Yorkshire Chartist Ben Wilson, that Newport was to have been the signal for a national uprising. Despite this significant setback the movement remained remarkably buoyant and remained so until late 1842. The majority of Chartists recognised the charismatic leadership of Feargus O'Connor, who was representative of a significant Irish working-class contribution to the movement. O'Connor concentrated on petitioning for Frost, Williams and William Jones to be pardoned. However, groups in Sheffield and Bradford planned further militant action.

Samuel Holberry led an abortive rising in Sheffield on 12 January, and on 26 January Robert Peddie attempted similar action in Bradford. In both Sheffield and Bradford spies had kept magistrates aware of the conspirators' plans, and these attempted risings were easily quashed. Frost and two other Newport leaders, Jones and Williams, were transported. Holberry and Peddie received long prison sentences with hard labour; Holberry died in prison and became a Chartist martyr.

== 1842 ==
19th-century British Republican flag proposal

According to Dorothy Thompson, "1842 was the year in which more energy was hurled against the authorities than in any other of the 19th century".

In early May 1842, a second petition, of over three million signatures, was submitted, and was yet again rejected by Parliament. The Northern Star commented on the rejection:

Three and a half million have quietly, orderly, soberly, peaceably but firmly asked of their rulers to do justice; and their rulers have turned a deaf ear to that protest. Three and a half millions of people have asked permission to detail their wrongs, and enforce their claims for RIGHT, and the 'House' has resolved they should not be heard! Three and a half millions of the slave-class have holden out the olive branch of peace to the enfranchised and privileged classes and sought for a firm and compact union, on the principle of EQUALITY BEFORE THE LAW; and the enfranchised and privileged have refused to enter into a treaty! The same class is to be a slave class still. The mark and brand of inferiority are not to be removed. The assumption of inferiority is still to be maintained. The people are not to be free.

The depression of 1842 led to a wave of strikes, as workers responded to the wage cuts imposed by employers. Calls for the implementation of the Charter were soon included alongside demands for the restoration of wages to previous levels. Working people went on strike in 14 English and 8 Scottish counties, principally in the Midlands, Lancashire, Cheshire, Yorkshire, and the Strathclyde region of Scotland. Typically, strikers resolved to cease work until wages were increased "until the People's charter becomes the Law of the Land". How far these strikes were directly Chartist in inspiration "was then, as now, a subject of much controversy".

The Leeds Mercury headlined them "The Chartist Insurrection", but suspicion also hung over the Anti–Corn Law League that manufacturers among its members deliberately closed mills to stir-up unrest. At the time, these disputes were collectively known as the Plug Plot as, in many cases, protesters removed the plugs from steam boilers powering industry to prevent their use. Amongst historians writing in the 20th century, the term General Strike was increasingly used. Some modern historians prefer the description "strike wave".

In contrast, Mick Jenkins in his The General Strike of 1842 offers a Marxist interpretation, showing the strikes as highly organized with sophisticated political intentions. The unrest began in the Potteries of Staffordshire in early August, spreading north to Cheshire and Lancashire, where at Manchester a meeting of the Chartist national executive endorsed the strikes on the 16th. The strikes had begun spreading in Scotland and West Yorkshire from the 13th.

There were outbreaks of serious violence, including property destruction and the ambushing of police convoys, in the Potteries and the West Riding. Though the government deployed soldiers to suppress violence, it was the practical problems in sustaining an indefinite stoppage that ultimately defeated the strikers. The drift back to work began on 19 August. Only Lancashire and Cheshire were still strike-bound by September, the Manchester power loom weavers being the last to return to work on 26 September.

The state hit back. Several Chartist leaders were arrested, including O'Connor, George Julian Harney, and Thomas Cooper. During the late summer of 1842, hundreds were incarcerated. In the Pottery Riots alone, 116 men and women went to prison. A smaller number, but still amounting to many dozens—such as William Ellis, who was convicted on perjured evidence—were transported. One protester, Josiah Heapy, 19 years old, was shot dead. The government's most ambitious prosecution, personally led by the Attorney General, of O'Connor and 57 others, including almost all Chartism's national executive failed: none was convicted of the serious charges, and those found guilty of minor offences were never sentenced. Cooper alone of the national Chartist leadership was convicted at a different trial, having spoken at strike meetings in the Potteries. He wrote a long poem in prison called "The Purgatory of Suicides".

In December 1842 the Chartists held a joint national delegate conference with the National Complete Suffrage Union in Birmingham. Tensions with the NCSU soon surfaced and came to a head over their proposals both for a union with the Anti–Corn Law League, which was also broadly middle class, and for rewriting the People's Charter as a legislative Bill of Rights. In both, O'Connor perceived a threat to his leadership, and, unable to find agreement, the NCSU leader Joseph Sturge withdrew. In May 1843 William Sharman Crawford introduced the NCSU-approved bill to "a small and bored" House of Commons.

== Ireland ==
In 1842, all eighteen of Daniel O'Connell's Irish parliamentary party at Westminster voted in favour of the Chartist petition which, along with its radical democratic demands, included repeal of the 1800 Act of Union, i.e. the restoration of a separate Irish parliament. O'Connell had declared himself "a decided advocate of universal suffrage" because no one could properly fix "where the line should be drawn" between servitude and liberty. But the Chartists in England, and in their much smaller number in Ireland, were also to accuse O'Connell of being unreliable and opportunistic in his drive to secure Whig favour.

When in 1831 workers in the Dublin trades created their own political association, O'Connell moved to pack it. The Trades Political Union (TPU) was swamped by 5,000 mostly middle-class repealers who by acclaim carried O'Connell's resolution calling for the suppression of all secret and illegal combinations, particularly those "manifested among the labouring classes". When in 1841 the Chartists held the first meeting of the Irish Universal Suffrage Association (IUSA), a TPU mob broke it up, and O'Connell denounced the association's secretary, Peter Brophy as an Orangeman. From England, where O'Connor had joined the IUSA in solidarity, Brophy denounced O'Connell in turn as the "enemy of the unrepresented classes".

Karl Marx was of the view that O'Connell "always incited the Irish against the Chartists", and did so precisely "because they too had inscribed Repeal on their banner". He suggested that O'Connell feared that, in drawing together national and democratic demands, the Chartist influence induce his mass following to revolt against "the established habit of electing place-hunting lawyers" and of seeking "to impress English Liberals".

== Mid-1840s ==
Despite this second set of arrests, Chartist activity continued. Beginning in 1843, O'Connor suggested that the land contained the solution to workers' problems. This idea evolved into the Chartist Co-operative Land Company, later called the National Land Company. Workers would buy shares in the company, and the company would use those funds to purchase estates that would be subdivided into 2, 3, and 4 acres (0.8, 1.2, and 1.6 hectare) lots. Between 1844 and 1848, five estates were purchased, subdivided, and built on, and then settled by lucky shareholders, who were chosen by lot.

In 1848 a Select Committee was appointed by Parliament to investigate the financial viability of the scheme, and it was ordered that it be shut down. Cottages built by the Chartist Land Company are still standing and inhabited today in Oxfordshire, Worcestershire, Gloucestershire and on the outskirts of London. Rosedene, a Chartist cottage in Dodford, Worcestershire, is owned and maintained by the National Trust, and is open to visitors by appointment.

Candidates embracing Chartism also stood on numerous occasions in general elections. There were concerted campaigns in the election of 1841 and election of 1847, when O'Connor was elected for Nottingham. O'Connor became the only Chartist to be elected an MP; it was a remarkable victory for the movement. More commonly, Chartist candidates participated in the open meetings, called hustings, that were the first stage of an election. They frequently won the show of hands at the hustings, but then withdrew from the poll to expose the deeply undemocratic nature of the electoral system. This is what Harney did in a widely reported challenge against Lord Palmerston in Tiverton, Devon, in 1847. The last Chartist challenge at a parliamentary poll took place at Ripon in 1859.

== 1848 petition ==
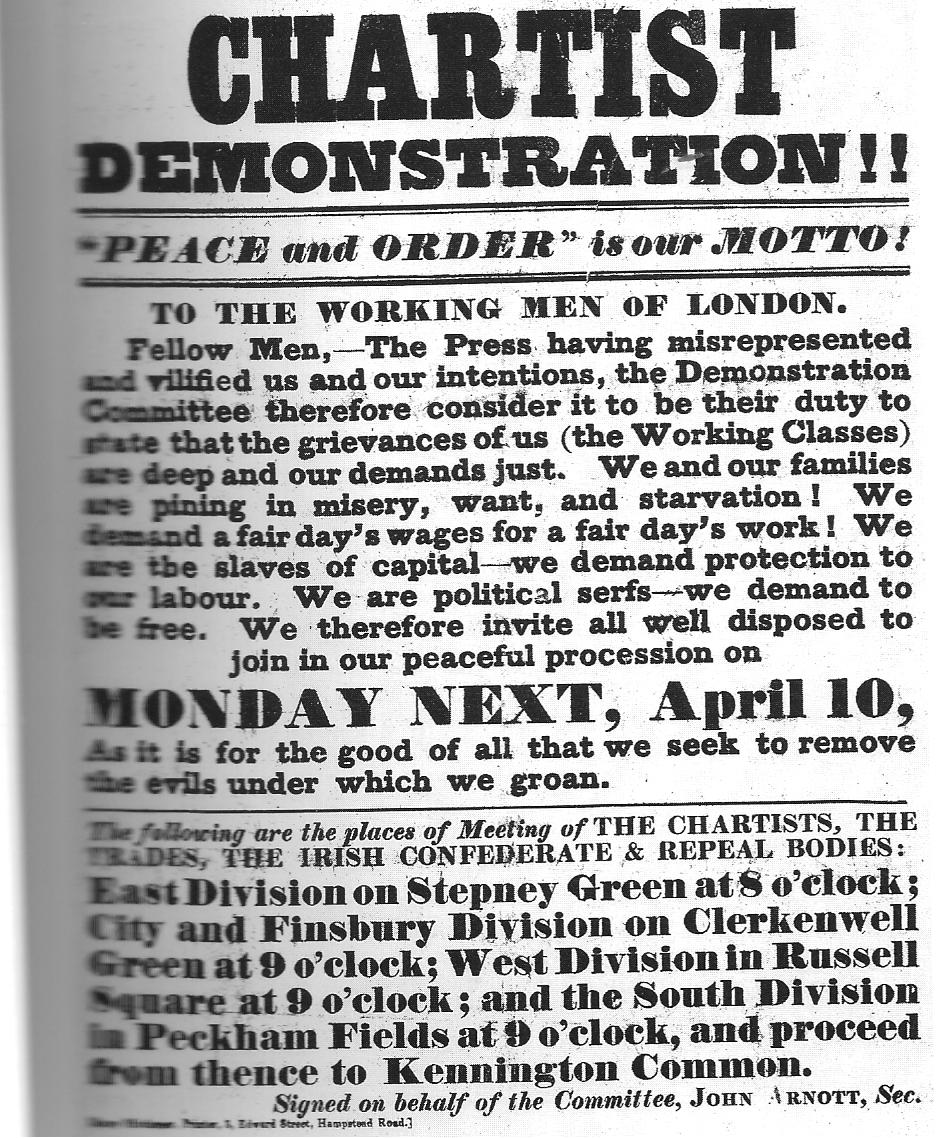
An 1848 poster advertising the Great Chartist Meeting

In February 1848, following the arrival of news of a revolution in Paris, Chartist activity increased. In March there were protests or bread riots in Manchester, Glasgow, and Dublin, and a new demonstration was announced for 10 April 1848, to be held on Kennington Common, London. After the meeting, a planned procession would carry a third petition to Parliament. Marches and demonstrations were also planned for April 10 in Manchester and elsewhere.

In anticipation of the announced march, Parliament revived a statute dating to the time of Charles II that forbade more than 10 persons from presenting a petition in person. That was followed on April 7 by new legislation making certain seditious acts "proposing to make war against the Queen, or seeking to intimidate or overawe both Houses of Parliament" or openly speaking or writing "to that effect" felonies in Great Britain and Ireland, punishable by death or transportation. The authorities knew that the Chartists were planning a peaceful demonstration, but still wanted a large-scale display of force to counter the challenge, so 100,000 special constables were recruited to bolster the police force.

O'Connor, seeing that any form of resistance to authorities would be impossible, cancelled the planned procession to Parliament to present the petition. The meeting was peaceful and finished without incident, after which the petition with its many signatures was sent to Parliament in three cabs accompanied by a small group of Chartist leaders.

Parliament's repressive measures strengthened an already-present impulse to violent resistance. In June there was widespread drilling and arming in the West Riding and the devising of plots in London. In Bingley, Yorkshire, a group of "physical force" Chartists led by Isaac Ickeringill were involved in a huge fracas at the local magistrates' court and later were prosecuted for rescuing two of their compatriots from the police. William Cuffay, a London labour activist and one of the organisers of the Kennington Common rally, was convicted of "conspiring to levy war" against the Queen and transported to Australia.

== Decline after 1848 ==
Chartism as an organized movement declined rapidly after 1848. Throughout the 1850s, pockets of strong support for Chartism could still be found in places such as the Black Country, but the final National Convention, held in 1858, was attended by only a handful of delegates.

Robert George Gammage, a veteran chartist and later historian of the movement, blamed Chartism's decline on O'Connor's egotism and vanity, but more recent historians (notably Dorothy Thompson) have tended to see the process as too complex to be attributed to the personality of a single individual.

Ernest Charles Jones became a leading figure in the National Charter Association during its decline, together with George Julian Harney, and helped to give the movement a clearer socialist direction. Jones and Harney knew Karl Marx and Friedrich Engels personally. Marx and Engels at the same time commented on the Chartist movement and Jones' work in their letters and articles.

In Kennington, the Brandon Estate featured a large mural by Tony Hollaway, commissioned by London County Council's Edward Hollamby in the early 1960s, commemorating the Chartists' meeting on 10 April 1848.

== Religious disputes ==
During this period, a widely held religious doctrine of early Christianity in England had taken hold "to the effect that it was 'wrong for a Christian to meddle in political matters.' All of the denominations were particularly careful to disavow any political affiliation and he who was the least concerned with the 'affairs of this world' was considered the most saintly and worthy of emulation." This was at odds with many Christian Chartists, for "Christianity was to them above all practical, something that must be carried into every walk of life. Furthermore, there was no possibility of divorcing it from political science."

William Hill, a Swedenborgian minister, wrote in the Northern Star: "We are commanded ... to love our neighbors as ourselves ... this command is universal in its application, whether as a friend, Christian or citizen. A man may be devout as a Christian, ... but if as a citizen he claims rights for himself he refuses to confer upon others, he fails to fulfil the precept of Christ ..." The conflicts between these two views led many like Joseph Barker to see Britain's churches as pointless. "I have no faith in church organisations," he explained. "I believe it my duty to be a man; to live and move in the world at large; to battle with evil wherever I see it, and to aim at the annihilation of all corrupt institutions and the establishment of all good, and generous, and useful institutions in their places."

To further this idea, some Christian Chartist churches were formed where Christianity and radical politics were combined and considered inseparable. More than 20 Chartist churches existed in Scotland by 1841. Pamphlets made the point and vast audiences came to hear lectures on the same themes by the likes of J. R. Stephens, who was highly influential in the movement. Political preachers thus came into prominence.

Between late 1844 and November 1845, subscriptions were raised for the publication of a hymnal, which was printed as a 64-page pamphlet and distributed for a nominal fee, although no known copy is thought to remain. In 2011, a previously unknown and uncatalogued smaller pamphlet of 16 hymns was discovered in Todmorden Library in the North of England. This is believed to be the only Chartist Hymnal in existence. Heavily influenced by dissenting Christians, the hymns are about social justice, "striking down evildoers", and blessing Chartist enterprises, rather than the conventional themes of crucifixion, heaven, and family.

Some of the hymns protest the exploitation of child labour and slavery. One proclaims, "Men of wealth and men of power/ Like locusts all thy gifts devour". Two celebrate the martyrs of the movement. "Great God! Is this the Patriot's Doom?" was composed for the funeral of Samuel Holberry, the Sheffield Chartist leader, who died in prison in 1843, while another honours John Frost, Zephaniah Williams, and William Jones, the Chartist leaders transported to Tasmania in the aftermath of the Newport rising of 1839.

The Chartists were especially critical of the Church of England for unequal distribution of the state funds it received, resulting in some bishops and higher dignitaries having grossly larger incomes than other clergymen. This state of affairs led some Chartists to question the very idea of a state-sponsored church, leading them to call for absolute separation of church and state.

Facing severe persecution in 1839, Chartists took to attending services at churches they held in contempt to display their numerical strength and express their dissatisfaction. Often they forewarned the preacher and demanded that he preach from texts they believed supported their cause, such as 2 Thessalonians 3:10, 2 Timothy 2:6, Matthew 19:23 and James 5:1–6. In response, the set-upon ministers often preached the need to focus on things spiritual and not material, and of meekness and obedience to authority, citing such passages as Romans 13:1–7 and 1 Peter 2:13–17.

== Leadership ==
Dorothy Thompson argues that, "Chartism was a movement whose members, supporters, and most of its leaders, were working men. A few were shopkeepers, innkeepers or marginal members of lesser professions." Ernest Jones (1819–1869), was born into the landed gentry, became a barrister, and left a large documentary record. "He is the best-remembered of the Chartist leaders, among the pioneers of the modern Labour movement, and a friend of both Marx and Engels."

According to Thompson, Feargus O'Connor the proprietor of the Northern Star was the "most well-loved man" of the movement:

For the Chartists ... O'Connor was the acknowledged leader of the movement. Abler men among the leadership there certainly were and men with a clearer sense of direction in which a working-class movement should go, but none of them had the appeal which O'Connor had nor his ability to win the confidence and support of the great crowds who made up the Chartist meetings in their heyday. Over 6 ft (183 cm) tall—he was almost the tallest man in the House of Commons—and with a voice which could easily carry an open-air meetings of tens of thousands, with a handsome appearance, a quick wit and a rich vein of scurrility when it came to abusing his opponents, Connor possessed all the qualities of the first rate popular orator.

Many of the early historians of Chartism attributed the failure of Chartism at least in part to O'Connor. He was accused of egotism and of being quarrelsome. In recent years, however, there has been a trend to reassess him in a more favourable light.

According to Thompson, George Julian Harney:

is a particularly good figure to take as central to the study of Chartism. For five years (1845–50) he was the editor of the Northern Star. He was one of the few leading figures who entered the movement in its earliest days—coming in straight from an active part in the dramatic and principled fight against the stamp duties on newspapers which is one of the highlights of 19th century radical action—and remained active throughout the years of its mass influence.

According to Tristram Hunt:

George Julian Harney, Chartism's enfant terrible ... was firmly on the radical side of the movement, advocating the use of physical force and enjoying riling his conservative comrades by flaunting the red cap of liberty at public meetings. In and out of jail, endlessly feuding with fellow Chartists, and ultimately expelled from the party, the Robespierre-admiring Harney remained convinced that insurrection was the surest route to achieve the demands of the charter.

== Legacy ==
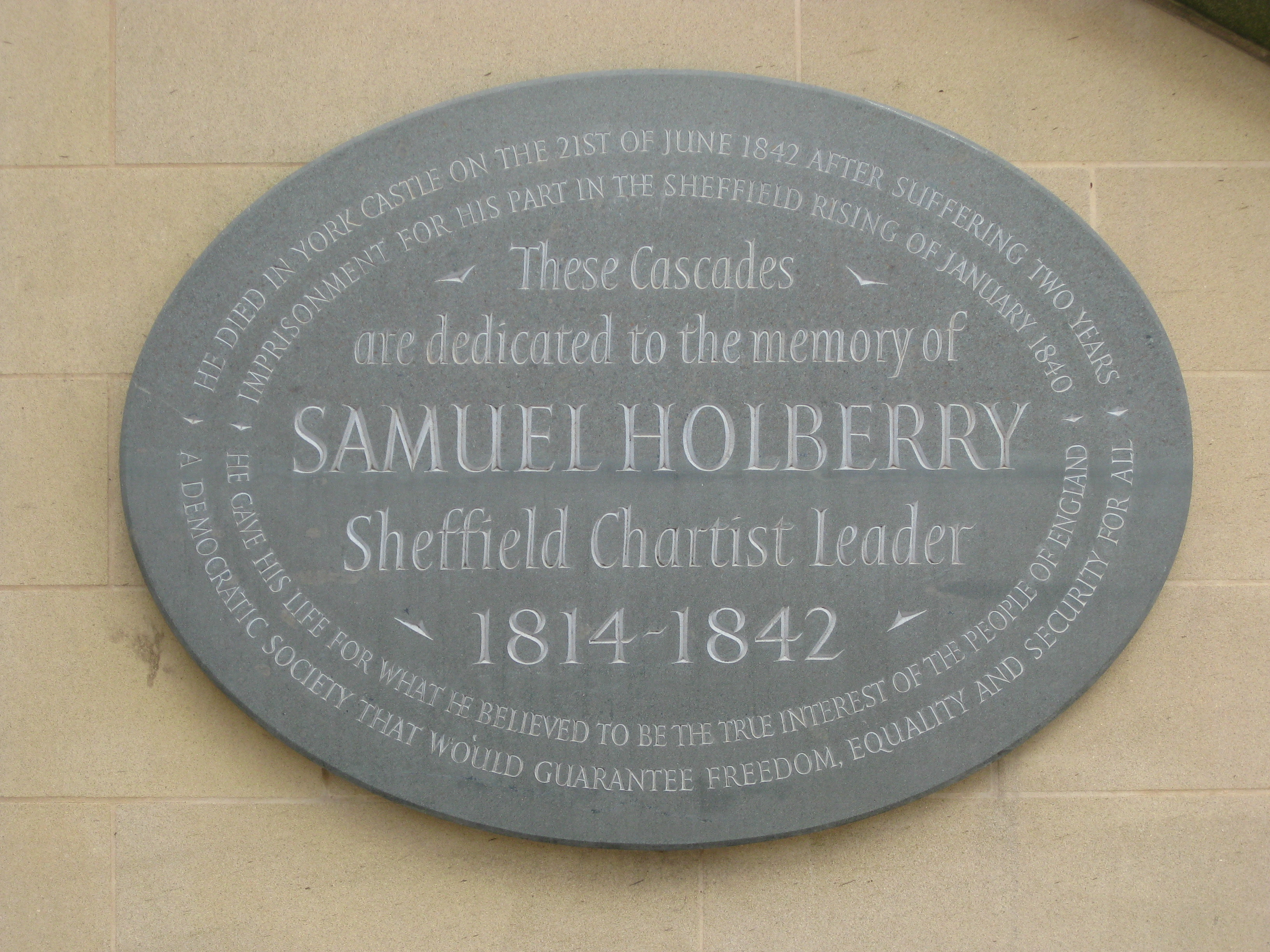
A plaque commemorating Samuel Holberry in Sheffield's Peace Gardens, by Ieuan Rees

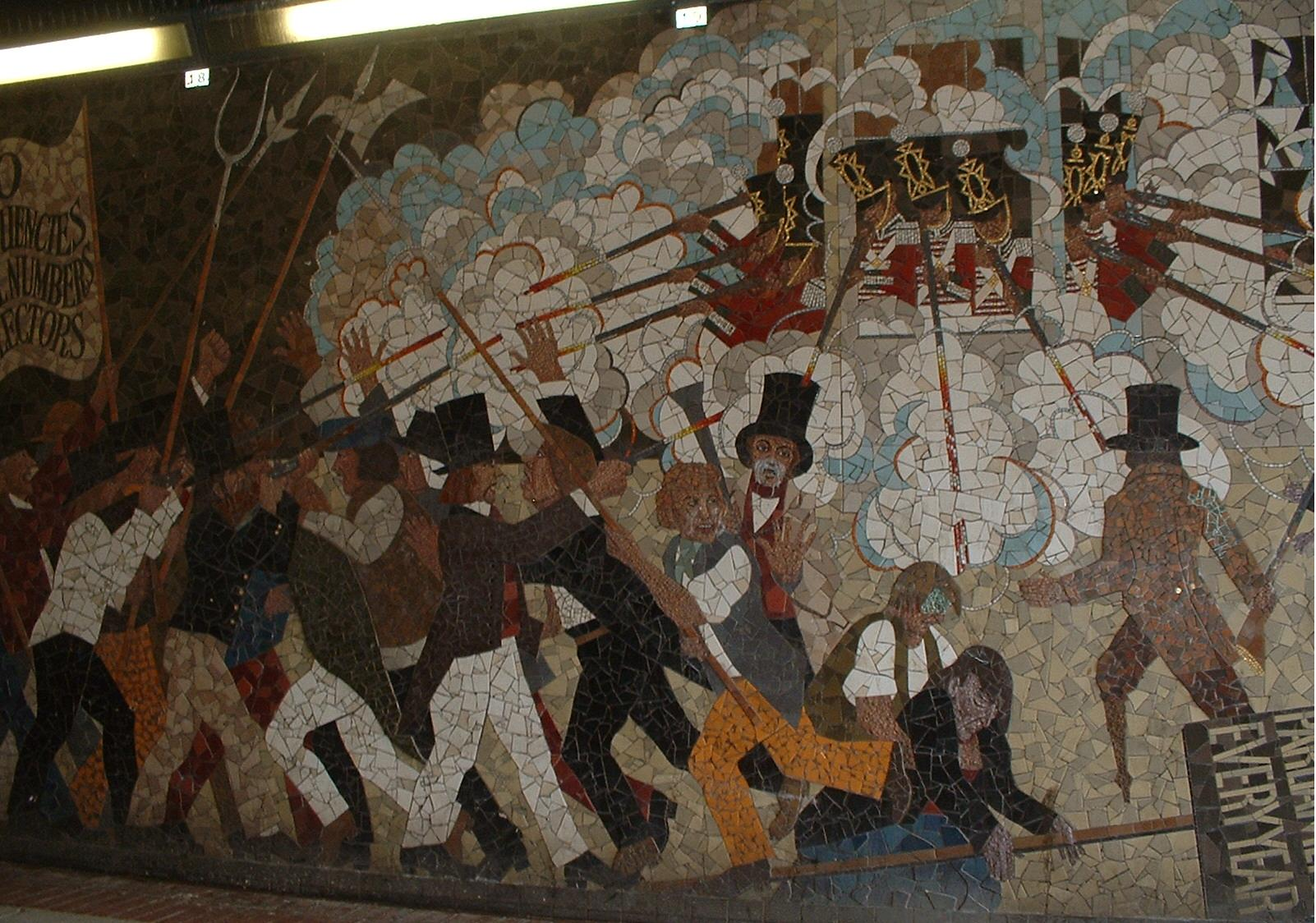
Former Chartist Mural in Newport commemorating the uprising

Malcolm Chase argues that Chartism was not, "a movement that failed but a movement characterized by multiplicity of small victories." Moreover, eventually "Chartism collapsed, but Chartists did not."

=== Eventual reforms ===
Chartism did not directly generate any reforms. However, after 1848, as the movement faded, its demands appeared less threatening and were gradually enacted by other reformers. Middle-class parliamentary Radicals continued to press for an extension of the franchise in such organisations as the National Parliamentary and Financial Reform Association and the Reform Union. By the late 1850s, the celebrated John Bright was agitating in the country for franchise reform. But working-class radicals had not gone away. The Reform League campaigned for manhood suffrage in the 1860s and included former Chartists in its ranks.

In 1867 part of the urban working men was admitted to the franchise under the Reform Act 1867, and in 1918 full manhood suffrage was achieved. Other points of the People's Charter were granted: secret voting was introduced in 1872 and the payment of MPs in 1911. Annual elections remain the only Chartist demand not to be implemented.

=== Enabling political progressions ===
Political elites feared the Chartists in the 1830s and 1840s as a dangerous threat to national stability. In the Chartist stronghold of Manchester, the movement undermined the political power of the old Tory-Anglican elite that had controlled civic affairs. But the reformers of Manchester were themselves factionalised. Chartism has also been seen as a forerunner to the UK Labour Party.

=== Development of working class confidence ===
Participation in the Chartist Movement filled some working men with self-confidence: they learned to speak publicly, to send their poems and other writings off for publication—to be able, in short, to confidently articulate the feelings of working people. Many former Chartists went on to become journalists, poets, ministers, and councillors.

=== Colonies ===
Chartism was also an important influence in some British colonies. Some leaders were punished by transportation to Australia, where they spread their beliefs. In 1854, Chartist demands were put forward by the miners at the Eureka Stockade on the gold fields at Ballarat, Victoria, Australia. Within two years of the military suppression of the Eureka revolt, the first elections of the Victoria parliament were held, with near-universal male suffrage and by secret ballot (and with the successful use of secret voting in Australia, it spread to the UK and Canada in the 1870s, and later gradually to the U.S.)

It has been argued that Chartist influence in Australia led to other reforms in the late 19th century and well into the 20th century, including women's suffrage, relatively short three-year parliamentary terms, preferential voting (instant-runoff voting), compulsory voting and single transferable vote proportional representation.

In the African colonies after 1920, there were occasional appearances of a "colonial Chartism" that called for improved welfare, upgraded education, freedom of speech, and greater political representation for native people.

== See also ==
- Condition of England question
- Constitutional reform in the United Kingdom
- Diggers
- John Frost (Chartist)
- Levellers
- Reform Bills
- Representation of the People Act 1884
- Republicanism in the United Kingdom
- Richard Spurr
- Chartism in Wales

General:

- Politics of the United Kingdom
