= Communist Correspondence Committee =

Association of communists founded by Karl Marx and Friedrich Engels

Communist Correspondence Committee Kommunistisches Korrespondenz-Komitee
- Founder: Karl Marx; Friedrich Engels
- Founded: 1846
- Dissolved: 1 June 1847; 178 years ago
- Merged into: Communist League
- Ideology: Communism
- Political position: Far-left

The Communist Correspondence Committee (German: Kommunistisches Korrespondenz-Komitee) was an association in the Anglo-French area, of communists founded by Karl Marx and Friedrich Engels, with committees in Brussels, London, Cologne, and Paris, with the aim of politically and ideologically organising socialists of different countries to form a revolutionary proletarian party.

== History ==
The first committee was formed in Brussels which became the headquarters of the Correspondence Committee, with members including Karl Marx, Wilhelm Wolff, Joseph Weydemeyer, Edgar von Westphalen, Ferdinand Wolff, and Philip Giot.

Another committee was formed in London between May and June 1846, formed by Joseph Maximilian Moll and Karl Schapper, among others. In June 1846, the Wuppertal communist Gustav Adolf Koettgen approached the Brussels committee and suggested that the German communists should inform each other of their actions, which the Committee welcomed.

Engels, who went to France in 1846 upon the committee’s assignment, led the struggle against Pierre-Joseph Proudhon's reformist influence, the “true socialism” of Karl Grün and "Weitlingism," better known as the levelling communism of Wilhelm Weitling, among Paris workers. In August 1846, Engels formed the Paris Committee there, on behalf of the Brussels Committee, to disseminate the ideas of the committees under the League of the Just.

From 1846 to 1847, Heinrich Bürgers and Roland Daniels worked in Cologne for the Correspondence Committee and the physician Georg Weber in Kiel. The traveling salesman and poet Georg Weerth also worked as a courier for the committees.

At the London conference in 1847, at which the Communist League was formed, for which Marx and Engels later wrote the Communist Manifesto, all of the committees were present, for Paris Engels and for Brussels Wolff.

== Bibliography ==
- Karl Obermann: Zur Geschichte des Kommunistischen Korrespondenzkomitees im Jahre 1846, insbesondere im Rheinland und in Westfalen. In: Beiträge zur Geschichte der deutschen Arbeiterbewegung. Berlin 1962, Sonderheft, S. 116 ff.
- Walter Schmidt: Wilhelm Wolff als Mitglied des Kommunistischen Korrespondenzkomitees 1846. In: Beiträge zur Geschichte der Arbeiterbewegung. Berlin 1964, Heft 3, S. 443 ff.
- Herwig Förder, Martin Hundt, Jefim Kandel, Sofia Lewiowa (Hrsg.): Bund der Kommunisten. Dokumente und Materialien, Band 1: 1836–1849. Dietz Verlag, Berlin 1970, S. 322–446.
- Herwig Förder: Marx und Engels am Vorabend der Revolution. Akademie Verlag, Berlin 1960, S. 52–74. Kapitel: „Die Auseinandersetzung mit Weitling (30. März 1846)“, „Das ‚Zirkular gegen Kriege‘ (11. Mai 1846“)
- David Rjazanov: Marx und Engels – nicht nur für AnfängerInnen. Rotbuch Verlag, Berlin 1973, S. 57–61. ISBN 3-88022-005-0 Lesen (englisch).
- Walter Schmidt: Zur Kontroverse um den New-Yorker „Volks-Tribun“ von Mai bis Oktober 1846. In: Zentralinstitut für Philosophie (Hrsg.): Alternativen denken. Berlin 1991, S. 62–71.
