= Communist League =

International political party active from 1847 to 1852

Communist League Bund der Kommunisten
- Leader: Karl Schapper
- Founder: Karl Marx; Friedrich Engels; Karl Schapper
- Founded: 1 June 1847; 179 years ago
- Dissolved: November 1852; 174 years ago
- Merger of: League of the Just; Communist Correspondence Committee
- Headquarters: London; Cologne (after 1848)
- Newspaper: Kommunistische Zeitschrift (1847); Neue Rheinische Zeitung (1848–1849); Neue Rheinische Zeitung Revue (1850)
- Ideology: Communism; Marxism; Revolutionary socialism
- Political position: Far-left
- Colours: Red

Party flag

The Communist League (German: Bund der Kommunisten) was an international political party established on 1 June 1847 in London, England. The organisation was formed through the merger of the League of the Just, headed by Karl Schapper, and the Communist Correspondence Committee of Brussels, Belgium, in which Karl Marx and Friedrich Engels were the dominant personalities. The Communist League is regarded as the first Marxist political party and it was on behalf of this group that Marx and Engels wrote the Communist Manifesto late in 1847. The Communist League was formally disbanded in November 1852, following the Cologne Communist Trial.

== Organisational history ==
=== Background ===
During the decade of the 1840s the word "communist" came into general use to describe those who supposedly hailed from the left wing of the Jacobin Club of the French Revolution. This political tendency saw itself as egalitarian inheritors of the 1795 Conspiracy of Equals headed by Gracchus Babeuf. The sans-culottes of Paris which had decades earlier been the base of support for Babeuf — artisans, journeymen, and the urban unemployed — was seen as a potential foundation for a new social system based upon the modern machine production of the day.

The French thinker Étienne Cabet inspired the imagination with a novel about a utopian society based upon communal machine production, Voyage en Icarie (1839). The revolutionary Louis Auguste Blanqui argued in favor of an elite organising the overwhelming majority of the population against the "rich," seizing the government in a coup d'état, and instituting a new egalitarian economic order.

One group of Germans in Paris, headed by Karl Schapper, organised themselves in the form of a secret society known as the League of the Just (Bund der Gerechten) and participated in a May 1839 rebellion in Paris in an effort to establish a "Social Republic." Following its failure the organisation relocated its centre to London, while also maintaining local organisations in Zürich and Paris.

Revolution was in the air across many of the monarchies of Europe.

=== Creation of the Communist League ===
The year 1846 found Karl Marx and his close friend and co-thinker Friedrich Engels in Brussels, establishing a small political circle of radical German émigrés called the Communist Correspondence Committee and writing for the German-language Deutsche Brüsseler Zeitung ("Brussels German Newspaper"). Also important in this early circle was Wilhelm Wolff, a talented and radical writer hailing from the Silesian peasantry who had been forced to emigrate due to his agitation against the Prussian autocracy.

The Brussels Communist Correspondence Committee had at the same time small counterparts located in London and Paris, composed of a handful of radical German expatriates living there. Relations between these small groups were not close, with petty jealousies and ideological disagreements preventing the participants from functioning as an effective political unit.

Be that as it may, in the latter part of January 1847 the disparate parts of the fledgling German Communist movement began to congeal in a single organisational entity when the London center of the League of the Just first broached the idea of organisational unity with the Communist Corresponding Committee. A letter of 20 January 1847 by Schapper requested that Marx join the League in anticipation of a scheduled London congress at which a new set of principles would be adopted based upon the ideas previously expressed by Marx and Engels. Both Marx and Engels were persuaded by the appeal and they both joined the League of the Just shortly thereafter, followed by other members of the Communist Corresponding Committee.

In June 1847, the London congress took place and the League of the Just adopted a new charter formally changing the group's name to the Communist League. The Communist League was structured around the formation of primary party units known as "communes," consisting of at least 3 and not more than 10 members. These were in turn to be combined into larger units known as "circles" and "leading circles," governed by a central authority selected at regular congresses. The League's programme called for the overthrow of the bourgeoisie and establishment of the rule of the proletariat and the construction of a new society free both of private property and social classes.

The initial conference was attended by Engels, who convinced the League to change its motto to Karl Marx's phrase, Working Men of All Countries, Unite!. At the same conference, the organisation was renamed the Communist League and was reorganised significantly.

In particular, Marx did away with all "superstitious authoritarianism," as he called the rituals pertaining to secret societies. The conference itself was counted as the first congress of the new League.

The Communist League had a second congress, at Great Windmill Street, London, in November and December 1847. Both Marx and Engels attended, and they were assigned the task of composing a manifesto for the organisation. This became The Communist Manifesto.

The League was not able to function effectively during the 1848 revolutions, despite temporarily abandoning its clandestine nature. The Workers' Brotherhood was established in Germany by members of the League, and became the most significant revolutionary organisation there. During the revolution Marx edited the radical journal the Neue Rheinische Zeitung. Engels fought in the Baden campaign against the Prussians (June and July 1849) as the aide-de-camp of August Willich.

The Communist League reassembled in late 1849, and by 1850 they were publishing the Neue Rheinische Zeitung Revue journal, but by the end of the year, publication had ceased amid disputes between the managers of the group. Willich and Schapper wanted to continue to focus on revolutions, while Marx and Engels wanted to focus on building an international workers' movement. This would divide the league in two. The Willich-Schapper Group would be located in France and become compromised by the Prussian police.

In 1850, the German master spy Wilhelm Stieber stole the register of the League's members from Dietz, who was a member of Willich-Schapper group, which he sent to France and several German states. This would help bring about the imprisonment of several members.

In November 1852, after the Cologne Communist Trial, the organisation immediately disbanded. The Willich-Schapper Group would disband a few months after.

== Notable members ==
- Johannes von Miquel
- Mathilde Franziska Anneke
- Heinrich Bauer
- Johann Baer
- Hermann Heinrich Becker
- Johann Philip Becker
- Adolph Bermbach
- Friedrich Heinrich Karl Bobzin
- Karl Heinrich Brüggermann
- Karl von Bruhn
- Heinrich Bürgers
- Roland Daniels
- Oswald Dietz
- Collet Dobson Collet
- Ernst Dronke
- Johann Eccarius
- Friedrich Engels
- Karl Ludwig Johann D'Ester
- August Herman Ewerbeck
- Ferdinand Freiligrath
- August Gebert
- Andreas Gottschalk
- Karl Theodor Ferdinand Grün
- Theodor Hagen
- Hermann Wilhelm Haupt
- Johann Joseph Jansen
- Albert Lehmann
- Frederick Lessner
- Wilhelm Liebknecht
- Karl Marx
- Friedrich Wilhelm German Mauer
- Joseph Moll
- Peter Nothjung
- Karl Pfänder
- Jakob Lukas Schabelitz
- Karl Schapper
- Alexander Schimmelpfennig
- Konrad Schramm
- Sebastian Seiler
- Georg Weerth
- Wilhelm Christian Weitling
- Joseph Weydemeyer
- Edgar von Westphalen
- August Willich
- Ferdinand Wolff
- Wilhelm Wolff

== See also ==
- German Workers Educational Association
- History of the Left in France
- July Monarchy
