= Year as Long as Life =

- Russian: Год как жизнь
- Directed by: Grigori Roshal
- Written by: Grigori Roshal; Galina Serebryakova
- Starring: Igor Kvasha; Andrei Mironov; Rufina Nifontova
- Cinematography: Leonid Kosmatov; Aleksander Simonov
- Music by: Dmitri Shostakovich
- Release date: 1966
- Country: Soviet Union
- Language: Russian

Year as Long as Life (Russian: Год как жизнь) is a 1966 Soviet biographical drama film directed by Grigori Roshal.

== Plot ==
The film takes place in Europe in the 19th century. The film shows the popular uprisings that took place there, as well as the search for truth and the confrontation of Karl Marx and opponents of the revolution.

== Cast ==
- Igor Kvasha as Karl Marx
- Andrei Mironov as Friedrich Engels
- Rufina Nifontova as Jenny von Westphalen
- Aleksey Alekseyev as Wilhelm Wolff
- Vasily Livanov as Georg Weerth
- Anatoly Solovyov as Karl Schapper
- Vladimir Balashov as Joseph Moll
- Svetlana Kharitonova
- Lev Zolotukhin
- Olga Gobzeva
