= Georg Fein =

German politician (1803–1869)

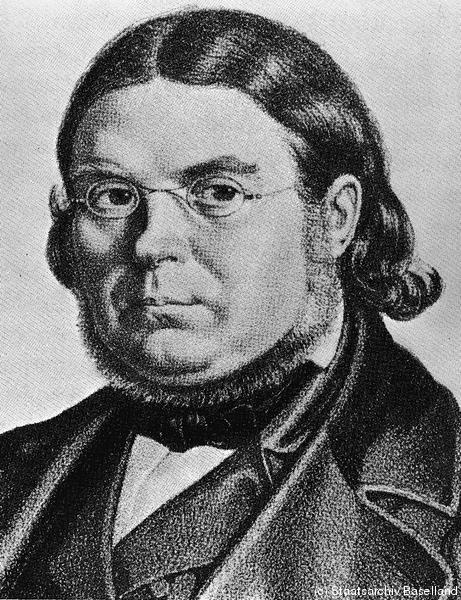
Georg Fein.

Georg Fein (1803 – 1869) was a German democratic journalist, an early German socialist and a liberal nationalist. He was a prominent publicist during the Vormärz period that preceded the Revolution of 1848.

== Early life ==
Georg Fein was born on 8 June 1803 in Helmstedt, into a wealthy middle-class family. His brother was the legal scholar Eduard Fein. Like his brother, Georg studied jurisprudence at the universities of Göttingen, Heidelberg, Berlin and Munich, beginning in 1822. As a student he became involved in a radical fraternity that promoted democracy and unification of the German states. Fein was soon in trouble with the authorities and did not complete his law studies.

In 1831 he became an editor of the liberal Deutsche Tribüne (German Tribune). Before it was outlawed in 1832, this was an influential liberal journal. In the early 1830s, Fein participated in several oppositional banquets. He also helped organise workers' educational associations and wrote poems and song lyrics addressed to workers.

Fein was soon under police surveillance and was arrested several times. In April 1833, a group of republican conspirators (including the labour leader Karl Schapper) carried out an unsuccessful uprising in Frankfurt, in which Fein was implicated. Facing arrest, he escaped to Switzerland.

== Exile ==
In Zurich, Fein became an editor at the Neue Zürcher Zeitung but was forced to resign because his articles were deemed too radical. In 1835 he joined 'Young Germany', a secret society modelled on Mazzini's 'Young Italy' and propagating a similar ideology of democracy, nationalism and social reform. Fein became a member of the Central Committee of Young Germany.

In 1836, Fein was expelled from Switzerland and went to Paris, where he joined the utopian communist 'League of the Banned', founded by Wilhelm Weitling. On its behalf, Fein published the journal Der Geächtete (The Banned). The League was subsequently renamed 'League of the Just' and later, under the influence of Karl Marx, the 'Communist League'. In France, Fein also befriended the exiled poets Heinrich Heine and Georg Büchner. In 1837, Fein was arrested and expelled from France.

For the next seven years, Fein travelled widely across Europe, using a variety of aliases. He went first to London, where he organised a German-language reading circle for workers; subsequently he went to Oslo, Paris, Strasbourg and Switzerland. An inheritance had made Fein independently wealthy. He maintained good contacts with German oppositional figures, and published abroad several writings that had been banned by censors in Germany. Among these was an essay Hoffmann von Fallersleben had intended as an introduction to his Political Poems, together with a lengthy afterword by Fein. Johann Jacoby, a prominent German democrat, is thought to have provided Fein with a copy of the liberal essay Whence and Whither by Theodor von Schön, a former minister in Prussia, which Fein also published with a lengthy afterword.

== Deportation to the USA ==
In 1844, Fein was back in Switzerland, participating in radical democratic circles. That year and in 1845, a group of Swiss liberals carried out armed invasions of the conservative canton of Lucerne. Fein participated on the side of the liberals but was captured and imprisoned in Lucerne. The liberal canton of Basel made him an honorary citizen, but his friends could not obtain his release. The authorities in Lucerne deported him to Austria, but the Habsburg government did not want him on its territory. After Norway and the state of Brunsvik both refused to take him, the Austrian chancellor, Metternich, decreed that Fein be deported to the United States of America. Fein arrived in the USA in 1846. In 1847, he held lectures in Philadelphia and Cincinnati on the history of the democratic movement in Germany since 1830. In Baltimore he founded the democratic club Concordia.

== Return to Europe ==
The Revolution of 1848 brought Fein back to Germany, where he arrived in September. He became a member of the Democratic Association of Bremen and a delegate to the second Democratic Congress in Berlin in October 1848. On the initiative of Hermann Kriege, Fein was elected president of the congress but soon resigned that position. He remained a member of the organisational commission of the congress. In October 1848, Fein became engaged to Ernestine von König, whom he married in 1849.

As the Revolution wound down, Fein and his wife emigrated to Switzerland, where he spent the rest of his life. He mostly devoted himself to organising workers' educational associations. In 1859 he joined the German National Association, a party that united moderate democrats and liberal nationalists and advocated the formation of a liberal 'small Germany' under Prussian leadership (rather than a 'great Germany' under Austrian leadership). He became the party's representative in Switzerland. The German National Association split in 1866, with the left wing protesting against the party's increasingly conservative nationalism. The right wing was eventually absorbed into the National Liberal party.

Fein's wife Ernestine died in 1862. Fein relocated from Liestal to Diessenhofen, Switzerland. There he wrote poetry and worked on his memoirs, which he had not completed when he died of a heart disease. Georg Fein died in Diessenhofen on 26 January 1869. Fein's literary remains were discovered in the State Archive of Lower Saxony in the 1980s.

== Sources ==
- Lent, D., "Fein, Georg." In: Jarck, H.R., and G. Scheel (ed's), Braunschweigisches Biographisches Lexikon: 19. und 20. Jahrhundert. Hannover 1996, p. 175f.
- Bürgi, M., "Fein, Georg." In: Historisches Lexikon der Schweiz. Vol. IV. Basel 2005.
- Spehr, F., "Fein, Georg." In: Allgemeine Deutsche Biographie. Vol. 6, Leipzig 1877, p. 606 f.
