= Dronke =

Dronke is a surname. Notable people with the name include:

- Ernst Friedrich Johann Dronke (1797–1849), German philologist and educator
- Ernst Dronke (1822–1891), German socialist and journalist, son of Ernst Friedrich Johann Dronke
- Maria Dronke (1904–1987), New Zealand actor, drama producer and teacher; sister of psychiatrist Arthur Kronfeld
- Peter Dronke (1934–2020), German academic, son of Maria, husband of Ursula
- Ursula Dronke (1920–2012), British medievalist, wife of Peter
