= Carl Pfänder =

German Marxist

Carl Heinrich Pfänder
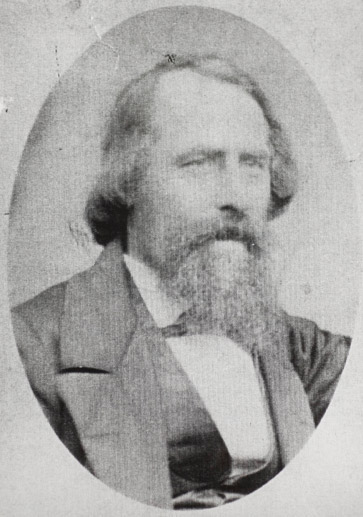
- Pfänder around 1870
- Born: February 15, 1819; Heilbronn, Kingdom of Württemberg
- Died: March 11, 1876 (aged 57); London, United Kingdom
- Resting place: Highgate Cemetery
- Occupations: Painter, revolutionary
- Political party: League of the Just; Communist League
- Relatives: William Pfaender (brother)

Carl Heinrich Pfänder (15 February 1819 – 11 March 1876) was a German portrait painter and revolutionary who was part of the circle of Karl Marx and Friedrich Engels in London.

== Biography ==
Pfänder was born in Heilbronn, the third child of master cooper Jakob Andreas Pfänder (1785–1852) and Johanna Friederike née Künzel (1785–1864). William Pfaender, who emigrated to the United States and became Minnesota State Treasurer, was his brother. He entered the Munich Academy in 1840 to study painting, but by 1842 had left. No paintings survive that can be attributed to him with certainty.

In 1844 he was in London, where he later settled and worked painting miniatures and decoration. On 10 April 1845, he married Caroline Louise Ruckwied (1820–1889) from Großbottwar in St. Kilian's Church in Heilbronn, returning with her to London. They first lived in Soho, near Karl Marx, and later moved to Camden Town; they had six children, Charles (1846–1902), Caroline (1847–1873), Henry (1849–1850), Emma (1851–1931), Henry William (born 1852) and Henriette (1855–1881). Victoria Beckham, the singer, fashion designer, television personality and Spice Girl, is his great-great-great-granddaughter.

Pfänder died in London of tuberculosis in 1879, and was buried at Highgate Cemetery in the West Cemetery. As of 2003 his grave could not be located.

== Political activities ==
In London in 1845, Pfänder took part in meetings of the German Workers Educational Association and soon also became a member of the League of the Just; he was on its leadership committee in 1847, when Marx and Engels joined it and spearheaded its transformation into the Communist League. Beginning in April 1848 Pfänder headed the London Communist League together with Heinrich Bauer and Johann Eccarius, and in August of the same year he and Bauer also became trustees of the Workers Educational Association.

In 1848, revolution broke out in the German states. Due to ill health, unlike other London communists, Pfänder did not go to Germany to support it until that summer, when he returned to Heilbronn and joined the local vigilante group. The revolution failed in summer 1849; he fought with the revolutionaries of Baden against Prussian troops in the Battle of Waghäusel, but then fled. He was captured on 24 June 1849, but had not played a leading role in the revolution and so was released a day later without charge. That autumn, he was back in London.

From then on, he worked closely with Marx and Engels. He was a signatory of the appeal to support German refugees that was published in newspapers on 25 September 1849, and a co-founder of the Social-Democratic Support Committee that was created for that purpose. He left the Workers Educational Association in September 1850, at the same time as Marx and Engels. For a time he served the Communist League as a phrenologist, assessing the shape of new members' heads. One of these was Wilhelm Liebknecht; in 1854, Pfänder was a witness at Liebknecht's marriage.

Pfänder was a member of the central committee of the International Workingmen's Association, the First International, from its foundation in 1864 until 1867 and again from 1870 to 1872, and was a signatory to many of its publications. His political activities ended in 1872, probably because of his worsening health.
