= Jacob Venedey =

German politician, opinion journalist and writer (1805–1871)

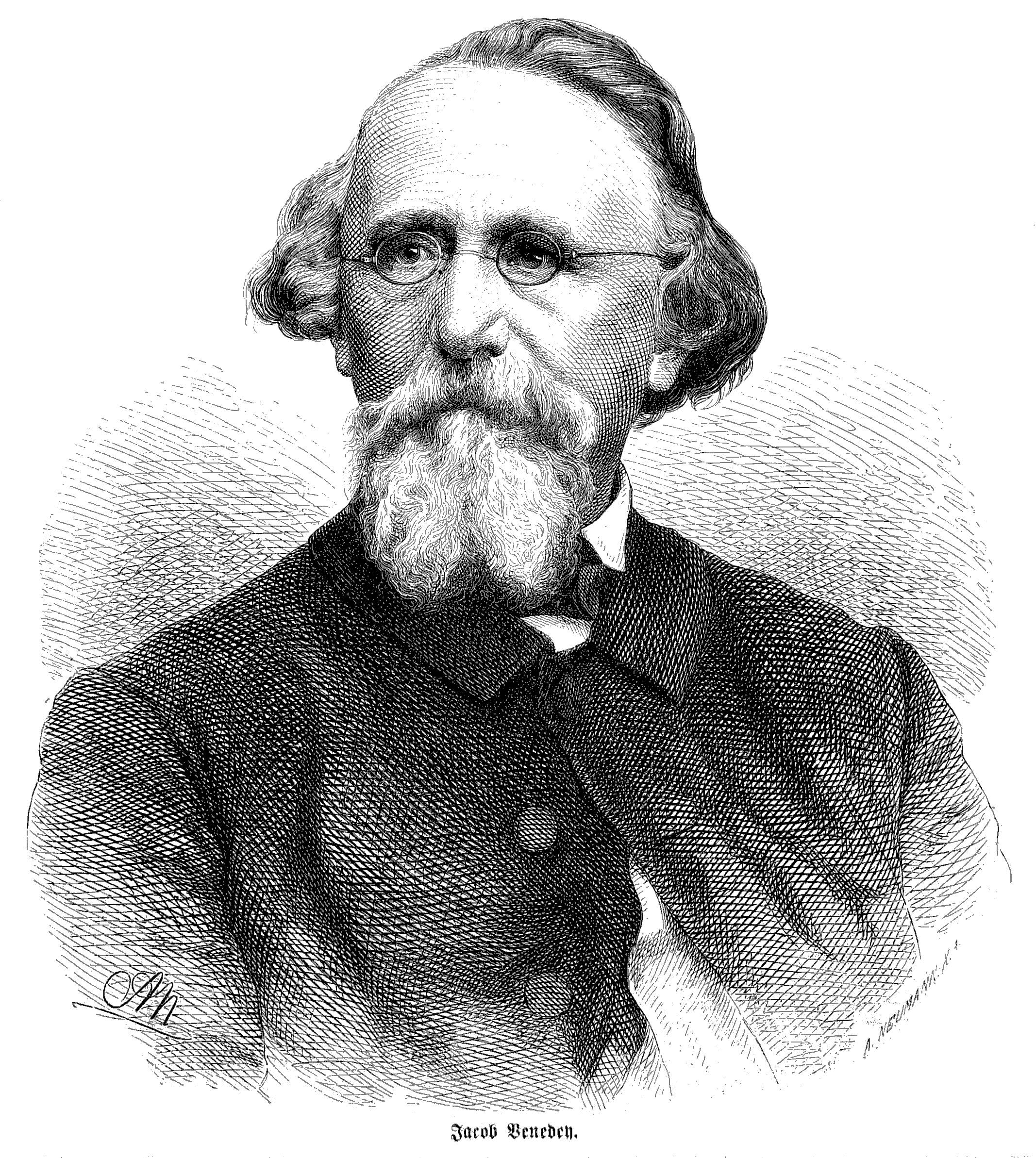
- Born: May 24, 1805; Cologne, French Empire
- Died: February 9, 1871 (aged 65); Oberweiler, Kingdom of Prussia
- Occupations: Revolutionary, journalist, writer
- Political party: League of Outlaws
- Spouse: Henriette Obermüller-Venedey

Jacob Venedey (24 May 1805, Köln – 8 February 1871, Oberweiler) was a German revolutionary, journalist and writer.

== Biography ==
From 1824 to 1827 he studied at the universities of Heidelberg and Bonn. Venedey worked at his father's law firm. During his studies he was a member of the student fraternity. In the early 1830s, he began to publish works. He took part in a demonstration for a united and free Germany in Neustadt an der Weinstraße. He was repeatedly persecuted by the authorities. In September 1832 he was arrested in Mannheim and imprisoned. In addition to participating in the demonstration, he was accused of violating the Law on the press and membership in the brotherhood.

Venedey was admitted to the Masonic Lodge of St Jean de Jerusalem in Nancy in 1833. In 1837 he delivered the eulogy at the grave of his Masonic brother Ludwig Börne in Paris.

He escaped from prison to Strasbourg. There, together with other German émigrés, he founded the "Bund der Geächteten" (The League of Outlaws), in which he played an active role. In this alliance, which set itself the goal of achieving a free regime for Germany, Venedey represented the right, bourgeois-liberal wing; in contrast to the other leader of the union, the socialist Theodor Schuster, he paid little attention to social issues, believing that after the introduction of a democratic system they would resolve themselves.

He worked as a Parisian correspondent for the Augsburg newspaper Allgemeine Zeitung and the Leipziger Allgemeine Zeitung.

He published the magazine "The Outcast" ("Disgraced", "Der Geächtete"), which led to his deportation to Le Havre. After a favorable review given by the French Academy of the work of Venedey, later translated into German under the title "Römertum, Christentum, Germanentum" (Frankfurt, 1840), Jacques Arago and François Mignet procured him permission to live unhindered in Paris. There he also was acquainted with Heinrich Heine.

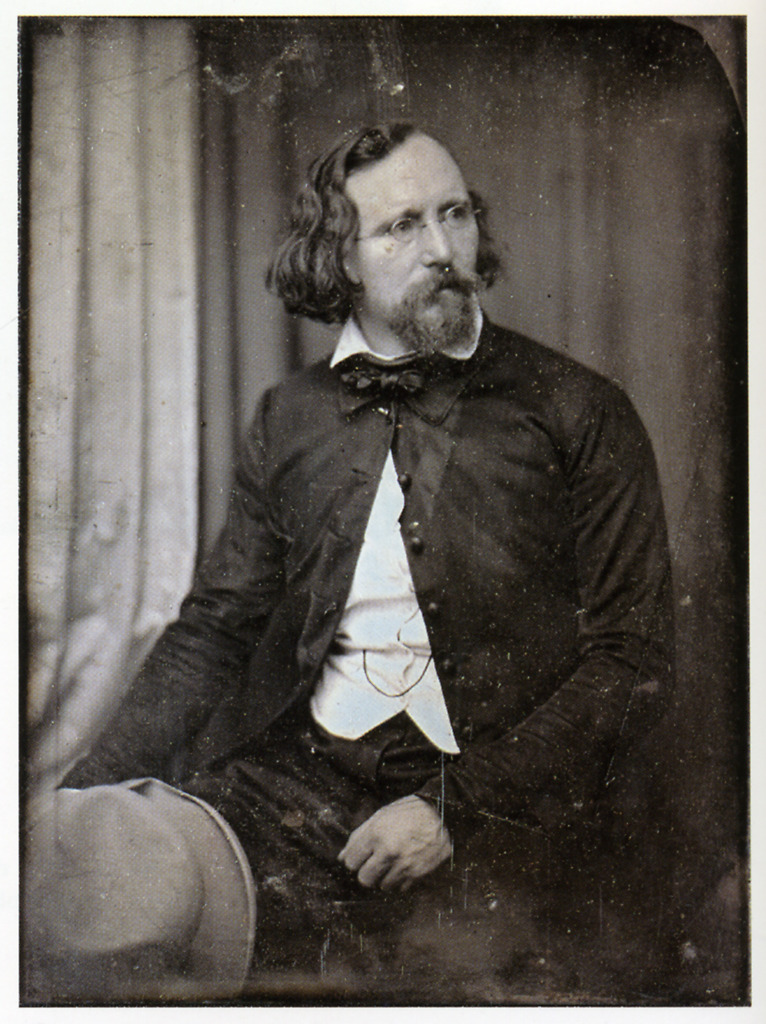
Daguerreotype of Jacob Venedey by Hermann Biow, 1848

Venedey returned to Germany only in 1848, he was one of the leaders of the left in the Provisional Parliament and the National Assembly in Frankfurt. He fought for the political unification of all Germany, speaking out against the separatists and against the Prussian leadership. Venedey fought against the Prussian hegemony after the Austro-Prussian-Italian war.

In the 1840s he was a contributor to the first and second editions of the Rotteck-Welcker State Dictionary (Rotteck-Welckersches Staatslexikon). In 1848 he was a member of the German Pre-Parliament and the Frankfurt Pre-Parliament.

In 1850 he took part in the Danish-Prussian War as a war correspondent. The Prussian government expelled him from Berlin and Breslau, after which he moved to Bonn in 1852, and in 1853 to Zurich. In 1855 he returned to Germany as a freelance writer and first lived in Heidelberg, from 1858 in Badenweiler.

== Works ==
- Das Geschwornengericht in den preußischen Rheinprovinzen. Köln 1830
- Reise- und Rasttage in der Normandie. 1838
- Preußen und Preußenthum. Mannheim 1839
- Die Deutschen und Franzosen nach dem Geiste ihrer Sprachen und Sprüchwörter. X, 176 S., Heidelberg, Winter, 1842.
- Wahrheiten mit und ohne Schleier. Von einem deutschen Verbannten. Paris 1843
- Machiavel, Montesquieu, Rousseau. Franz Duncker. Berlin, 1850.

== See also ==
- League of the Just, League of Outlaws' successor
