= August Hermann Ewerbeck =

German revolutionary

- Born: 12 November 1816; Danzig, Prussia
- Died: 4 November 1860 (aged 43); Paris
- Resting place: Père Lachaise
- Education: the University of Berlin and the University of Utrecht
- Known for: early political associate of Karl Marx and Friedrich Engels; a leader of the Parisian communities of the utopian socialist organization, League of the Just; a member of the communist league; the translator of the French writings of Étienne Cabet and Ludwig Feuerbach into German

August Hermann Ewerbeck (12 November 1816 – 4 November 1860), known by his middle name of Hermann, was a pioneer socialist political activist, writer, and translator. A physician by vocation and a German by birth, Ewerbeck is best remembered as an early political associate of Karl Marx and Friedrich Engels, as a leader of the Parisian communities of the utopian socialist organization, League of the Just, and as the translator of the French writings of Étienne Cabet and Ludwig Feuerbach into German.

== Biography ==
=== Early years ===
Hermann Ewerbeck, was born in 1816 in Danzig, Prussia, and graduated from the University of Berlin and the University of Utrecht.

Ewerbeck's dissertation, written in Latin and accepted in 1839, was entitled De phaenomenis opticis subjectivis (Subjective Phenomena of Optics).

=== Political career ===
Ewerbeck was among the earliest political acquaintances of Karl Marx and Friederich Engels and is mentioned twice by name in the oldest piece of surviving correspondence between the duo, a letter written to Marx in Paris early in October 1844.

Ewerbeck joined the Paris chapter of the League of the Just (Bund der Gerechten), a utopian socialist organization, and soon became a leading member. In 1847 it was he who translated Étienne Cabet's influential socialist novel Voyage en Icarie from French into German under the pen name "Dr. Wendell Hippler."

In August 1846, Ewerbeck introduced Engels to a small group of Parisian cabinetmakers and tanners who supported the revolutionary movement. Engels was initially smitten by Ewerbeck, characterizing him as "very cheerful, completely tractable, more receptive than ever" and opined to Marx that "he and I will come to see pretty well eye to eye in all things." This was not to be, however, as Engels soon developed an aversion to Ewerbeck's ideas, declaring "it is disgraceful that one should have to pit oneself against such barbaric nonsense." Engels specifically objected to Ewerbeck's interest in the ideas of Pierre-Joseph Proudhon and Anastasius Grün.

Ewerbeck was also the author of German Philosophy and Socialism.

When the League of the Just was dissolved into the Communist League, Ewerbeck thereby became a member of that organization.

Ewerbeck was part of a group including Moses Hess and Karl Ludwig Johann D'Ester that tried to get Marx to abandon Engels. According to Oscar J. Hammen, Engels had "wounded the sensibilities of other Communists because he was likely to act as the hatchet-man for Marx. As a result he was sometimes impetuous, brusque and even brutal." Their efforts to divide Marx and Engels were not successful. In a letter to Engels, Marx wrote, "That I would leave you in the lurch even for a moment is pure fantasy. You remain my intimate friend as I remain yours, let us hope."

Ewerbeck was one of the Paris reporters of the Neue Rheinische Zeitung.

=== Death and legacy ===
Hermann Ewerbeck left the Communist League in 1850. He died on 4 November 1860 in Paris.

== Works ==
=== Books ===
- Wie ich Communist bin, und mein communistisches Glaubensbekenntniss (Why I am a Communist, and My Communist Faith). Paris: 1847.
- Qu'est-ce que la Bible: d'après la nouvelle philosophie Allemande (What Is the Bible According to the New German Philosophy?) Editor. Paris: 1850.
- L'Allemagne et les Allemands (Germany and the Germans). Paris: Garnier fréres, 1851.
- Les langues de l'Europe moderne (The Languages of Modern Europe). With August Schleicher. Paris: Ladrange, 1852.
- La Russie et l'équilibre européen (Russia and the European Balance). Paris: 1854.

=== Translations ===
- Étienne Cabet, Reise nach Ikarien (Voyage of Icarie). Paris: 1847.
- Ludwig Feuerbach, Qu'est-ce que la religion? D'après la nouvelle philosophie allemande (What Is Religion? According to the New German Philosophy). Paris: Ladrange, 1850.

== See also ==
- Icarians
