= Sebastian Seiler =

German–American journalist (1810–1890)

Franz Sebastian Seiler (1810 – 4 December 1890) was a German, an associate of Wilhelm Weitling, a Swiss reformer. He was a journalist on the Rheinische Zeitung and a member of the Brussels Communist Correspondence Committee in 1846. Seiler was "a stenographer to the French National Assembly in 1848 and 1849." He joined the Communist League and took part in the 1848-1849 revolution in Germany. Following the suppression of that revolution, Seiler escaped to London, England in the 1850s. From 1859-1860 he was the editor of the Deutsche Zeitung, and he started a weekly paper in 1860, The New Orleans Journal. Seiler later worked for Negro suffrage.
