= German Workers' Society =

- Deutscher Arbeiterverein
- Formation: August 1847
- Founder: Karl Marx; Frederich Engels
- Dissolved: 1848
- Headquarters: Brussels
- Secretary General: Wilhelm Wolff
- Publication: Deutsche-Brüsseler-Zeitung

German Workers' Society was an organisation founded by Karl Marx and Friedrich Engels in Brussels at the end of August 1847. It became the legal rallying centre for German revolutionary workers in Belgium. Some of the members were also members in the Brussels branch of the Communist League. Soon after the French revolution of 1848, the members of the society were arrested and deported by the Belgian police.

== See also ==
- German Workers Educational Association
