= Nifontov =

Nifontov (masculine, Russian: Нифонтов) or Nifontova (feminine, Russian: Нифонтова) is a Russian surname. Notable people with the surname include:

- Ivan Nifontov (born 1987), Russian judoka
- Rufina Nifontova (1931–1994), Soviet–Russian actress
