= Theodor Hagen =

Theodor Hagen may refer to:

- Theodor Hagen (music critic) (1823–1871), German-American journalist and critic
- Theodor Hagen (artist) (1842–1919), German landscape painter
