= Albert Lehmann =

German revolutionary

Albert Lehmann was a mid-nineteenth century German socialist revolutionary.

Born in Germany, Lehmann was a worker and a leading figure of the League of Just. Following the suppression of the uprising of 1848 and 1849, Lehmann fled Germany to settle in London, England. In London, he became a member of the German Workers Educational Society and a member of the Communist League. During the split in the Communist League, Lehmann joined the August Willich-Karl Schapper sectarian group as opposed to the Karl Marx and Frederick Engels group.
