= Karl von Bruhn =

German journalist and revolutionary

Johann Karl Balduin von Bruhn (16 March 1803, Herzhorn – 9 August 1877, Altona) was a German journalist and revolutionary. Due to his philosophical beliefs, Bruhn joined the League of Outlaws and the League of the Just. When the League of the Just dissolved into the Communist League, Bruhn joined the Communist League. However, in 1850, Bruhn was expelled from the Communist League. Later from 1861-1866, Bruhn was the editor of the Lassallean newspaper Nordstern in Hamburg, Germany.
