= Schabelitz =

Schabelitz is a surname. Notable people with the surname include:

- Jakob Lukas Schabelitz (1827–1899), Swiss bookseller and publisher
- R.F. Schabelitz (1884–1959), American writer, illustrator, comics artist, and painter
