= Pfander (surname) =

Pfander, Pfänder or Pfaender is a surname of german origin.

== People with the surname ==
- Albert Pfaender (1873-1946), American politician
- Alexander Pfänder (1870–1941), German philosopher
- Carl Heinrich Pfänder (1819–1876), German portrait painter and revolutionary
- James Pfander, American lawyer
- Karl Gottlieb Pfander (1803–1865), Swiss missionary
- William Pfaender (1826–1905), German-American politician and businessman

== See also ==
- Pfänder, mountain in western Austria
