= Gebert =

Gebert is a surname. Notable people with the surname include:

- Albert J. Gebert (1906–1980), football coach for the University of Wichita 1930–1941
- Anna Gebert (born 1979), Finnish violinist from Poland
- August Gebert German Socialist revolutionary
- Bolesław Gebert (1895–1986), American Communist Party official, one of the organization's top Polish-language speaking leaders
- Gordon Gebert (born 1941), child actor who is predominantly known for having smaller roles, in such films as Holiday Affair
- Konstanty Gebert (born 1953), Polish journalist and a Jewish activist, war correspondents of Polish daily newspapers, son of Bolesław Gebert
- Paul Gebert, Sr. (1870–1963), American politician and businessman
