= Conrad Schramm =

German revolutionary

Conrad Bernhard Schramm (23 August 1822, in Krefeld – 15 January 1858, in Saint Helier), sometimes written Konrad, was a German socialist revolutionary and as a result a member of the Communist League. Following the suppression of the uprisings of 1848 and 1849, Schramm refugeed to London, England in 1849. He became a manager of the Neue Rheinische Zeitung: Politisch-ökonomische Revue. Schramm was also a friend and an associate of both Karl Marx and Frederick Engels.

In 1850, he challenged August Willich, an opponent of Marx, to a duel. This was after Willich had insulted and challenged Marx, but Marx had refused to fight him. The pistol duel took place in Belgium as duels were forbidden by law in the United Kingdom. Schramm received a bullet wound to the head, but survived.

Schramm died in 1858, from Tuberculosis.
