= German Workers Educational Association =

- Deutscher Arbeiterbildungsverein
- Abbreviation: GWEA; DABV
- Formation: February 7, 1840; 186 years ago
- Founder: Karl Schapper; Joseph Moll; Heinrich Bauer
- Dissolved: c. 1917
- Headquarters: London

The German Workers Educational Association (GWEA or DABV; German: Deutscher Arbeiterbildungsverein) was a London-based organisation of radical German political émigrés established in 1840 by Karl Schapper and his associates. The organisation served during its initial years as the "above-ground" arm of the underground League of the Just and later as a mass organisation of the Communist League. The organisation continued to exist for more than 75 years, eventually terminating in 1917 due to the internment of Germans in Great Britain due to World War I.

== Organisational history ==
The German Workers Educational Association (GWEA) was established in London on 7 February 1840 by Karl Schapper and approximately half a dozen of his close political associates. The group was established as a rival to a more moderate group of German political émigrés known as the Deutsche Gesellschaft and was patterned after an organisation of radical French émigrés known as the Société Démocratique Française.

The GWEA included among its members individuals hailing from several countries and attained a membership of approximately 500 by 1845. In its initial incarnation the GWEA acted as a public arm of the underground revolutionary organisation known as the League of the Just. After 1847 it closely cooperated with the Communist League of Karl Marx, Frederick Engels, and their associates and served in effect as a broader "front" organisation for that more narrow revolutionary group.

Some time after 1850 the Communist League was split between factions and the GWEA was controlled by individuals hostile to Marx and Engels, who quit the organisation.

The GWEA formally affiliated with the International Workingmens Association (commonly known as the First International) in 1865. It changed its name to the Communist Workers Educational Association (CWEA) not later than 1871.

The CWEA continued to function until 1917, when the group was terminated due to the wartime internment of German political émigrés in London.

== See also ==
- German Workers' Society
