= Ernst Friedrich Johann Dronke =

German philologist (1797–1849)

Ernst Friedrich Johann Dronke (1797–1849) was a German philologist and educator.

Dronke was born on 28 June 1797 in Falkenberg. He studied philology and history at the Silesian Friedrich-Wilhelms-University in Breslau, then at the Friedrich-Wilhelms-Universität in Berlin. Subsequently, he taught at the Royal Gymnasium in Koblenz. In the autumn of 1841 he gave up this position and became headmaster of the Gymnasium at Fulda, where he died on December 10, 1849, at age 52. His numerous pupils praised him for his efficiency, as well as for his scientific seriousness and his impartiality. He wrote and published a number of works, making a name for himself. He also worked with Jacob Grimm on the second volume of the Weisthaeus. One of his sons was the writer and journalist Ernst Dronke.

== Works ==
- Aufgaben zum Uebersetzen aus dem Deutschen ins Lateinische. Nach der Grammatik von C. G. Zumpt. 2.Abt., 7. Ausg. Hölscher, Coblenz 1841 Digitalisat
- Annotatio critica in C. Cornelii Taciti Agricolam. Fulda 1842 HathiTrust Digital Library
- Lectiones Ciceronianae, Sallustianae, Ovidianae, e codibus Fuldensibus descriptae. Fulda 1849 HathiTrust Digital Library
- Codex diplomations Fuldensis. Theodor Fischer, Fulda 1850 Digitalisat
