= Johann Joseph Jansen =

German revolutionary

Johann Joseph Jansen (c. 1825–1849) was a German revolutionary. He was the brother of Karl Jansen, Johann Joseph was a democrat and as a result he became leader of the Cologne Workers' Association. He was a supporter of Andreas Gottschalk. He was shot by Prussian authorities in 1849 for his participation in the Baden-Palatinate uprising of 1849.
