= German Mäurer =

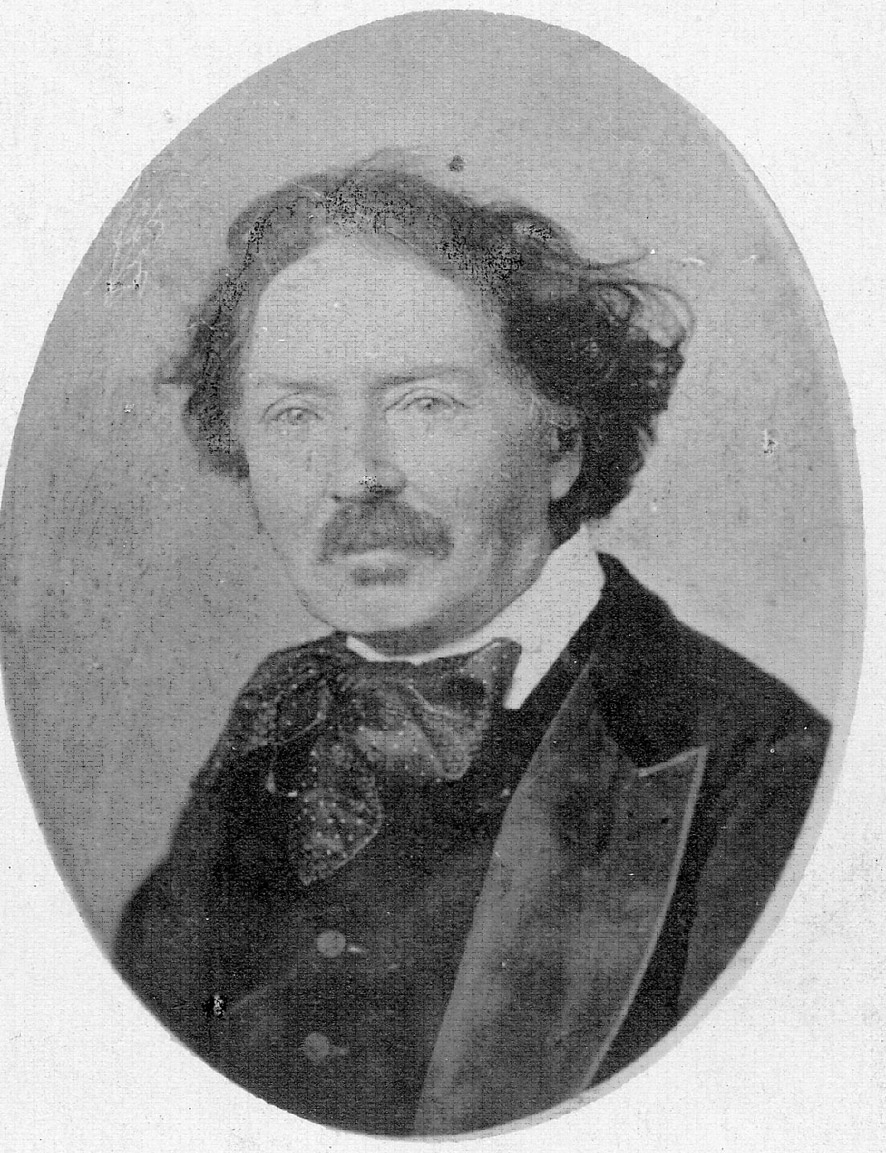
German Mäurer

Friedrich Wilhelm German Mäurer (11 February 1811, Bensberg – 7 July 1883, Paris) was a German Communist writer and leader of the early German labor movement. He joined the League of Outlaws ("Bund der Geächteten) because of his democratic beliefs. When the League of Outlaws became the League of the Just ("Bund der Gerechtigkeit"), Mäurer became a member of the League of the Just. He wrote poetry for its newsletters and several books, and with Moses Hess was an important link between it and Karl Marx.
