= Friedrich Heinrich Karl Bobzin =

German artisan and revolutionary

Friedrich Heinrich Karl Bobzin (born 1826) was a German artisan and revolutionary who became a member of the German Workers' Society in Brussels in 1847. He participated in the Baden-Palatinate uprising of 1849. Together with Gustav Struve, Bobzin headed the petty bourgeoisie emigrants in London.
