= Nico Steinbach =

German politician (born 1984)

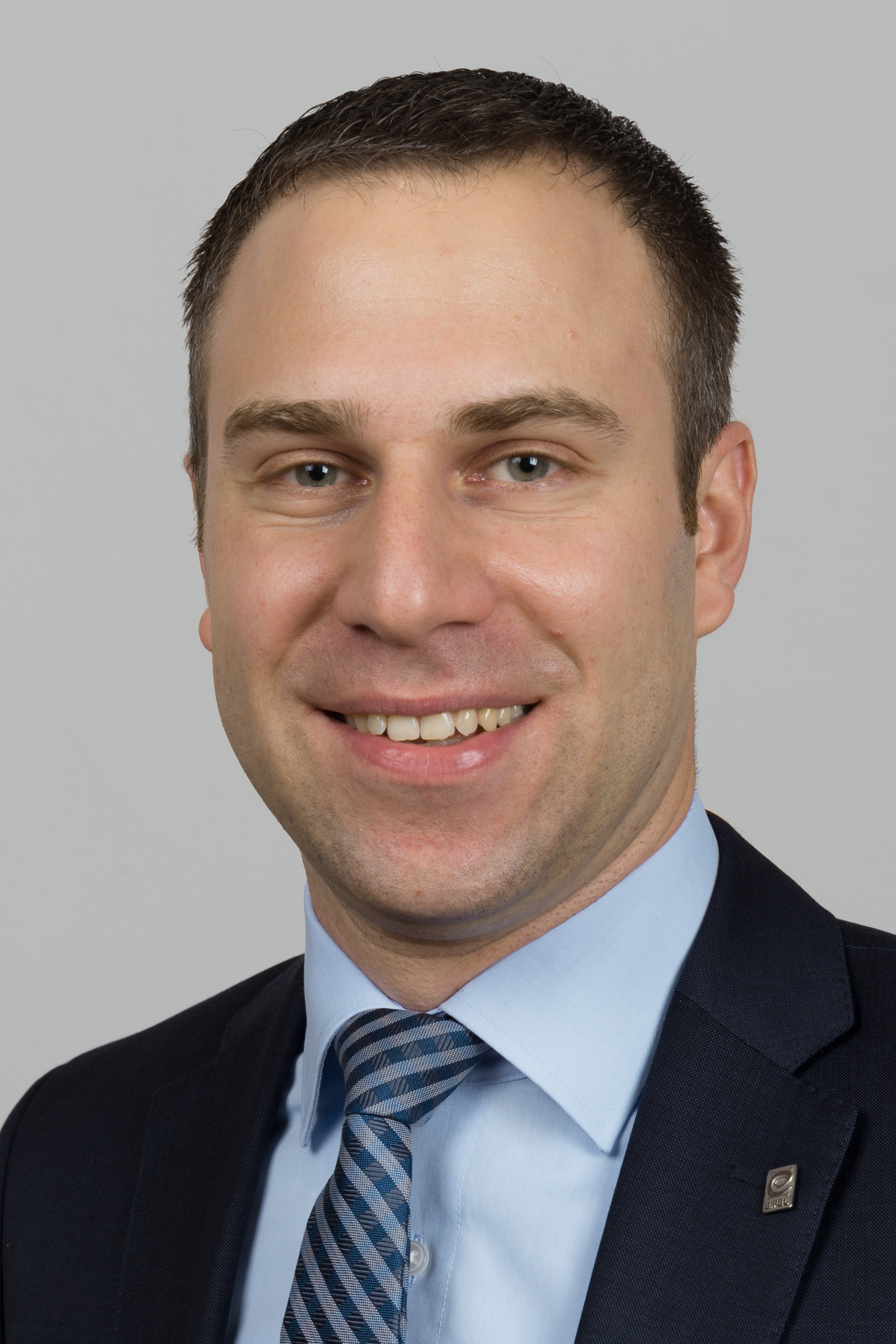
- Steinbach in 2016

Member of the Landtag of Rhineland-Palatinate
- Incumbent
- Assumed office 1 January 2015
- Preceded by: Monika Fink
- Constituency: Bitburg-Prüm (2016–present)

Personal details
- Born: 28 February 1984 (age 42) Bitburg
- Party: Social Democratic Party (since 2001)

Nico Steinbach (born 28 February 1984 in Bitburg) is a German politician serving as a member of the Landtag of Rhineland-Palatinate since 2015. He has served as mayor of Oberweiler since 2008.
