= Weinbach =

- Municipality
- Flag Coat of arms

- Location of Weinbach within Limburg-Weilburg district
- Interactive map of Weinbach
- Location within Germany Location within Hesse
- Coordinates: 50°26′N 08°18′E
- Country: Germany
- State: Hesse
- Admin. region: Gießen
- District: Limburg-Weilburg

Government
  - Mayor (2024–30): Christian Harms

Area
  - Total: 37.65 km^{2} (14.54 sq mi)
- Elevation: 268 m (879 ft)

Population (2025-12-31)
  - Total: 4,173
  - Density: 110.8/km^{2} (287.1/sq mi)
- Time zone: UTC+01:00 (CET)
  - Summer (DST): UTC+02:00 (CEST)
- Postal codes: 35796
- Dialling codes: 06471, 06474
- Vehicle registration: LM, WEL
- Website: www.gemeinde-weinbach.de

Weinbach is a municipality in Limburg-Weilburg district in Hesse, Germany.

== Geography ==
=== Location ===
Weinbach lies on the Lahn and the Weil between Wetzlar and Limburg an der Lahn.

=== Neighbouring communities ===
Weinbach borders in the north on the town of Weilburg, in the east on the community of Weilmünster, and in the west on the community of Villmar and the town of Runkel (all in Limburg-Weilburg).

=== Constituent communities ===
Weinbach is made up of eight Ortsteile. The main centre is also called Weinbach, and the outlying centres are Blessenbach, Edelsberg, Elkerhausen, Freienfels, Fürfurt, Gräveneck and Kleinweinbach.

== History ==
Fürfurt was mentioned in a document from sometime between 1148 and 1154, thus making it the first part of the community to have its first documentary mention. Elkerhausen’s first documentary mention came in 1191. The knightly family who lived there was heavily involved in a feud in the 14th century with the landlord, the Archbishop of Trier. The Elkerhauser Wasserburg (a moated castle) was destroyed in 1352. About 1500, there arose a stronghouse out of which a new castle grew.

Edelsberg had its first documentary mention in 1246, Blessenbach in 1267 and Weinbach in 1344. Freienfels Castle was built about 1300, presumably by the Diez family’s Weilnau branch. In 1327 it had its first documentary mention. Gräveneck Castle was built in 1395 by a knightly order under Nassau’s leadership to guard against the Knights of Elkerhausen.

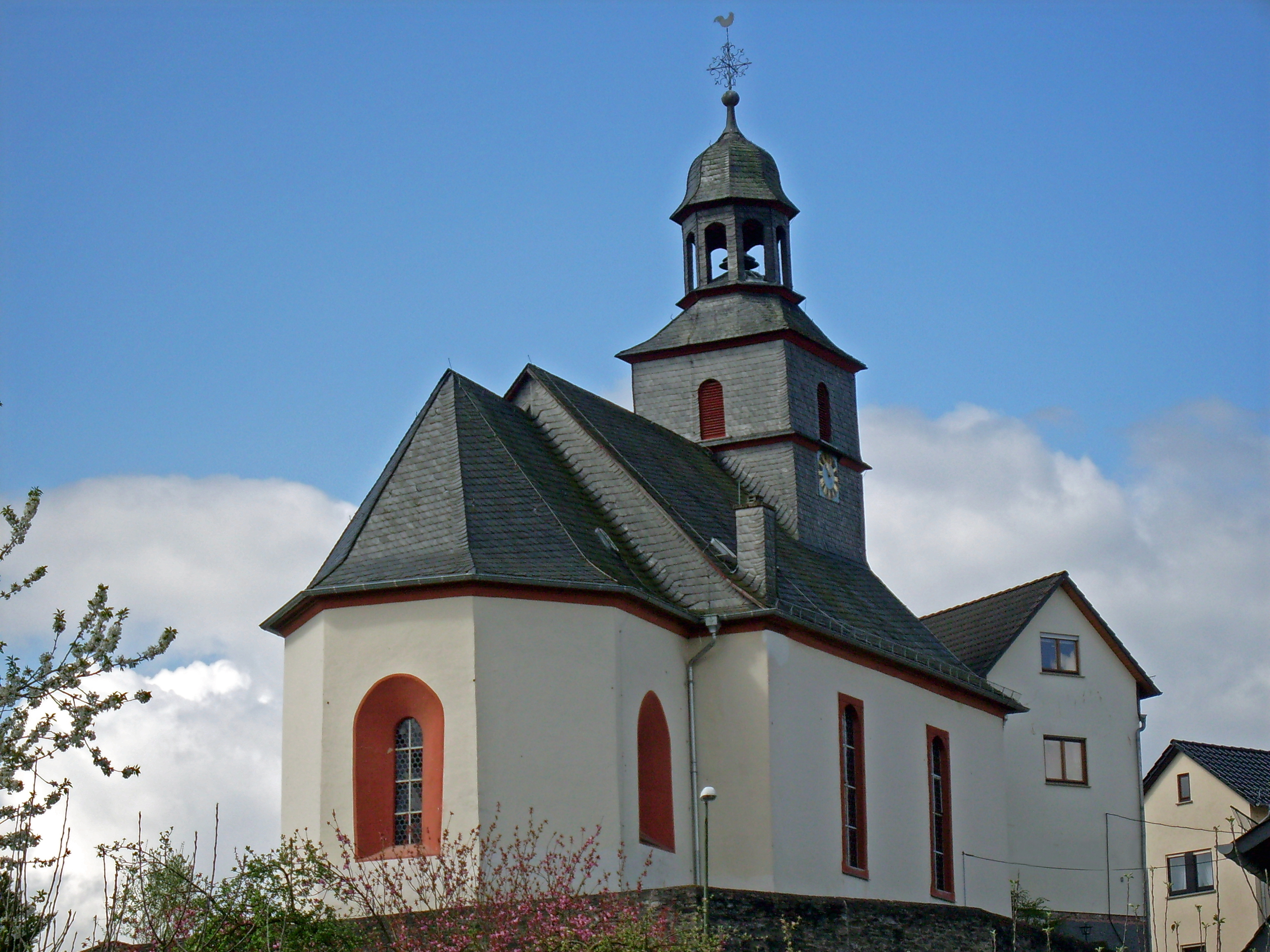
Weinbach - Evangelical church

Today’s Evangelical church in Weinbach arose in 1728; the forerunner church’s Early Gothic quire was incorporated into this newer church.

The history of the greater community of Weinbach began in 1970 when the formerly self-administering communities of Weinbach, Blessenbach, Freienfels and Gräveneck amalgamated in the course of municipal restructuring in Hesse. In 1974, the communities of Elkerhausen, Fürfurt and Edelsberg were also merged into the greater community.

== Politics ==
The municipal election held on 26 March 2006 yielded the following results:

Parties and voter communities		% 2006	Seats; 2006	% 2001	Seats; 2001
CDU	Christian Democratic Union of Germany	29.5	4	27.5	6
SPD	Social Democratic Party of Germany	43.7	7	48.8	11
GREENS	Bündnis 90/Die Grünen	5.5	1	3.6	1
FWG	Freie Wählergemeinschaft Weinbach	21.3	3	20.1	5
Total		100.0	15	100.0	23
Voter turnout in %		52.4		60.3	

=== Town partnerships ===
Weinbach has maintained a partnership arrangement with the Polish community of Debrzno, roughly 150 km southwest of Gdańsk in the Pomeranian Voivodeship, since 1992.

Since 2005, another partnership has existed with the Czech community of Blatno, which lies roughly 50 km south of Chemnitz, right at the Reitzenhain border crossing above the town of Chomutov.

== Culture and sightseeing ==
=== Buildings ===
- Burg Elkerhausen (castle)
- Burg Neu-Elkerhausen (castle) on the Lahn near Gräveneck
- Burg Freienfels (castle ruins) above the Weil in the outlying centre of Freienfels

== Economy and infrastructure ==
=== Transport ===
Weinbach is linked to the long-distance road network by Bundesstraße 456. On the Lahntalbahn (railway) are stations in the centres of Gräveneck and Fürfurt.

Until 1969, the centre of Freienfels was also linked to the rail network by the now abandoned Weiltalbahn.

=== Education ===
Weinbach has one primary school (Karl-Schapper-Schule).

=== Public institutions ===
- Weinbach Volunteer Fire Brigade, founded 1932 (includes youth fire brigade)
- Blessenbach Volunteer Fire Brigade, founded 1932 (includes youth fire brigade)
- Edelsberg Volunteer Fire Brigade, founded 1934 (includes youth fire brigade)
- Elkerhausen Volunteer Fire Brigade, founded 1934 (includes youth fire brigade)
- Freienfels Volunteer Fire Brigade, founded 1934 (includes youth fire brigade)
- Gräveneck Volunteer Fire Brigade, founded 1934 (includes youth fire brigade)

== Famous people ==
=== Sons and daughters of the town ===
- Karl Schapper (b. 30 December 1812, d. 29 April 1870 in London), forestry scientist, protagonist of the labour movement and revolutionary from the Duchy of Nassau.
- Helmut Hild, (b. 23 May 1921, d. 11 September 1999 in Darmstadt), Church president of the Evangelical Church in Hesse and Nassau.
