= Oswald Dietz =

German-American freedom fighter, engineer, and politician

Oswald Dietz (May 27, 1823 in Wiesbaden – March 9, 1898 in Cincinnati) was a German freedom fighter and German-American engineer and politician.

== Biography ==
He became an architect. He participated in the German revolution of 1848-1849. When the German uprising was suppressed, Dietz escaped to London. Oswald Dietz became a member of the August Willich-Karl Schapper sectarian proletarian group within the Communist League. Oswald Diest also participated in the Civil war in the United States of America. Dietz died in 1898.
