= Johann Baer =

Johann Baer was a German revolutionary socialist. He became a member of the Communist League. Following the Revolution of 1848 and 1849, he fled to London. Baer lived in London throughout the early 1850s. He was an associate of both Karl Marx and Frederick Engels.
