= Rufina Nifontova =

Soviet and Russian actress (1931–1994)

- Руфина Нифонтова
- Born: Rufina Dmitriyevna Pitade; September 15, 1931; Moscow, Soviet Union
- Died: November 27, 1994 (aged 63); Moscow, Russia
- Occupation: Actress
- Years active: 1955–1992

Rufina Dmitriyevna Nifontova (Russian: Руфина Дмитриевна Нифонтова; 15 September 1931 – 27 November 1994) was a Soviet and Russian stage and film actress. People's Artist of the USSR (1978).

== Biography ==
Rufina Nifontova was born in Moscow in a family with Greek roots.

Nifontova studied at the Gerasimov Institute of Cinematography (course of Bibikov-Pyzhova). In 1955 she graduated from VGIK and was admitted to the Film Actor Theater Studio.

In 1957 Nifontova came into the troupe of the Maly Theatre, where she became a famous actress.

In 1986–1991 – Secretary of the Board Union of Theatre Workers of the Russian Federation.

Nifontova died in Moscow at the age of 63, and was buried at the Vagankovo Cemetery.

== Personal life ==
- Father – Dmitry Ivanovich Pitade
- Mother – Darya Semyonovna Pitade
- Brothers – Aleksandr, Boris, and twin Vyacheslav
- Husband – Gleb Nifontov, filmmaker
  - Daughter – Olga, graduated from VGIK

== Awards and honors ==
- 1956 – Karlovy Vary International Film Festival (Award for Best Actress, for film Volnitsa)
- 1958 – Laureate Union Film Festival in First prize for the actors of the 1958
- 1960 – Laureate Union Film Festival in First prize for Best Actress for the 1960
- 1962 – Honored Artist of the RSFSR
- 1966 – People's Artist of the RSFSR
- 1967 – Order of the Badge of Honour
- 1974 – Order of the Red Banner of Labour
- 1978 – People's Artist of the USSR
- 1981 – Order of Friendship of Peoples

== Selected filmography ==
- The Sisters (1957) as Katya Bulavina
- The First Visitor (1965) as Alexandra Kollontai
- Year as Long as Life (1966) as Jenny Marx
- Intervention (1968) as Madam Tokarchuk, raider
- Honoré de Balzac's Mistake (1968) as Ewelina Hańska
- Do Not Part with Your Beloved (1979) as people's judge
- Could One Imagine? (1980) as Tatyana Nikolayevna's mother
- Time and the Conways (1984) as Mrs. Conway
