= Karl Ludwig Johann D'Ester =

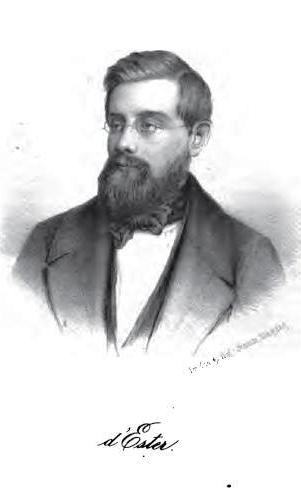
Karl Ludwig Johann D'Ester

Karl Ludwig Johann d'Ester (4 November 1813 – 18 June 1859) was a German medical doctor by vocation and a democrat and socialist by philosophy. Because of his beliefs, d'Ester joined the Cologne chapter of the Communist League. In 1848, he was elected as a deputy to the Prussian National Assembly where he caucused with the Left-wing deputies of that assembly. In October 1848, d'Ester became a member of the Central Committee of the German Democrats. D'Ester played a prominent part in the Baden-Palatinate uprising in 1849. Following the suppression of that uprising, d'Ester emigrated to Switzerland. He died in 1859.
