= Andreas Gottschalk =

German physician

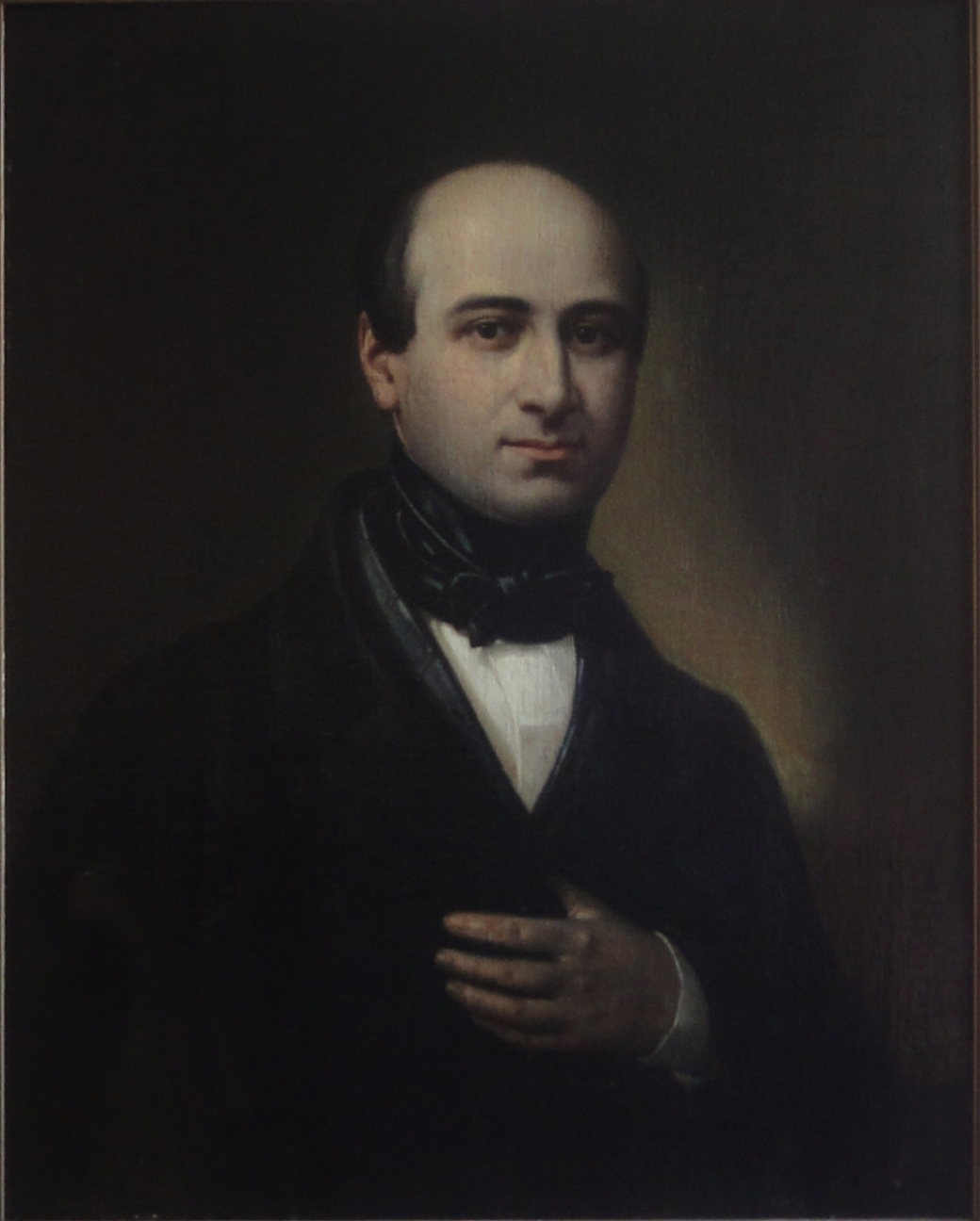
Portrait that was painted after his death

Andreas Gottschalk (28 February 1815 in Düsseldorf – 8 September 1849) was a German medical doctor. He was a member of the Cologne community Communist League. He was an exponent of the "Left" sectarian tendencies of the German working class movement.

He founded and became president in April 1848 of the Cologne Workers Association, which he led until he was arrested in June of that year. He was released from jail in December. After a short time abroad, he returned to Cologne, where he worked as a doctor for the poor until his death in the fall of 1849 having the previous year he had been "cheered on by a crowd of 5,000, called for the establishment of a revolutionary committee" as part of the 1848 revolts. Gottschalk died after contracting cholera himself.
