= Karl Heinrich Brüggemann =

German journalist (1810–1887)

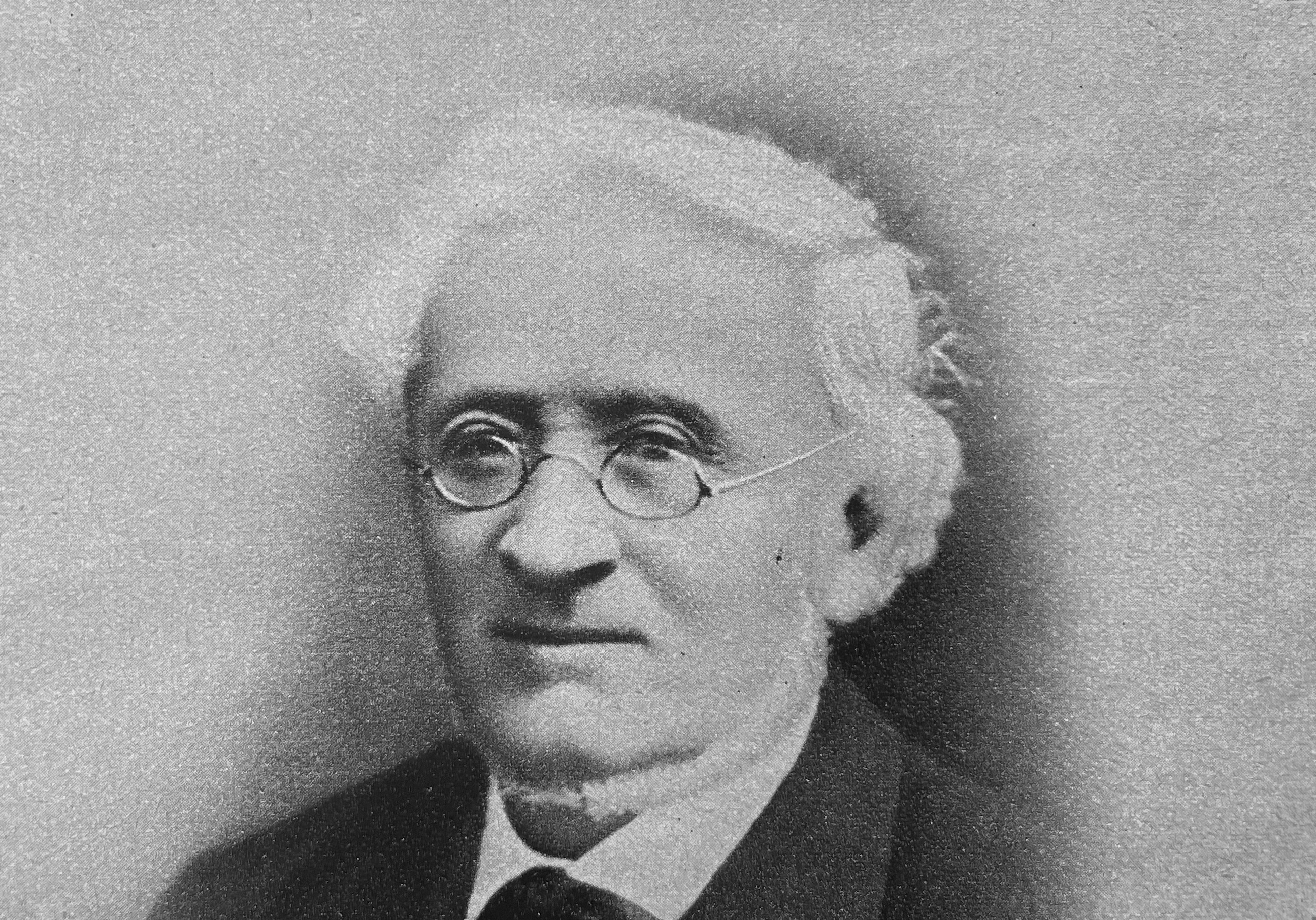

Karl Heinrich Brüggermann (1810–1887) German by birth, Brüggermann became a journalist of moderate liberal beliefs. He became editor-in-chief of the Kölnische Zeitung from 1845 through 1855.
