= August Gebert =

August Gebert was born in Mecklenburg, Germany and was a joiner by profession. He became a member of the Communist League while living in Switzerland. He continued to participate in the Communist League when he moved to London in 1850. There he became a part of the sectarian Willich-Schapper group within the Communist League, which is known for expelling Marx and Engels. In London he was the chair of the CABV (German Communist Workers' Educational Union) Whitechapel branch.
