= Heinrich Bürgers =

German journalist and editor

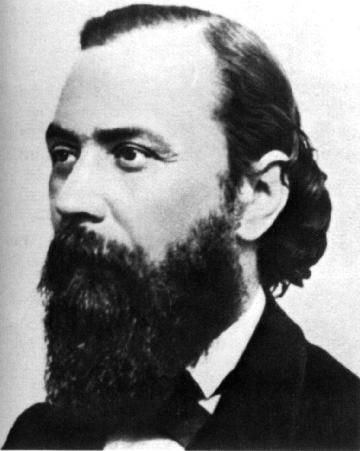

Johann Heinrich Georg Bürgers (21 June 1820, Cologne – 10 December 1878, Berlin) was a Prussian German journalist and an editor of the Neue Rheinische Zeitung He became a member of the Communist League and, in 1850, he became a member of the League's Central Authority. For his participation in the 1848-1849 uprising, Bürgers became one of the defendants in the Cologne communist trial in Cologne, Prussia in 1852.
