= Theodor Hagen (music critic) =

American journalist

Theodor Hagen [often spelled Theodore Hagen] (15 April 1823, Hamburg – 27 December 1871, New York City) was a writer on musical topics in Germany and the United States. He was a member of the local Communist League in Hamburg, Germany and took part in the publication and distribution of the Neue Rheinische Zeitung Politisch-ökonomische Revue.

== Life ==
He studied music in Hamburg and in Paris, in the latter city from 1841 until 1843. Soon after his return to Germany he became known as a writer on musical topics, especially as a contributor to Robert Schumann's Neue Zeitschrift für Musik. Also in Germany, he wrote two books, Civilisation und Musik (Civilization and Music; 1845) and Musikalische Novellen (Musical Novels; 1848).

He came to New York in 1854, and assumed the editorship of The Musical Gazette which was at the end of about six months consolidated with another journal under the title of The Musical Review and Gazette. In 1862, he became both editor and proprietor. He was active as a journalist and music critic.
