= Theodor Schuster =

German jurist and physician (1808–1872)

Carl Wilhelm Theodor Schuster (born September 18, 1808, in Lüne-Moorfeld; died 1872) was a German jurist and physician. As a revolutionary, he was one of the prominent figures of the League of Outlaws, a utopian socialist organization of German émigrés in Paris.

== Biography ==
Starting in 1829, Schuster worked as an adjunct professor at the University of Göttingen where he had obtained his Doctor of Law degree the same year.

After his involvement with the constitutionalist movement in the Kingdom of Hanover and the 1831 Göttingen Riots he had to flee Germany, going first to Strassbourg and 1832 to Paris. He became a socialist and a follower of the Swiss-born liberal economist Jean Charles Léonard de Sismondi.

Schuster joined the League of Outlaws and became one of the League's leaders, editing its journal, The Outlaw, from 1835 on. He gave financial aid to the German refugees in the 1840s.

== See also ==
- League of the Just, League of Outlaws' successor
