= Oberweiler =

- Municipality
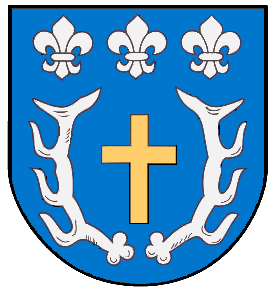
- Coat of arms

- Location of Oberweiler within Eifelkreis Bitburg-Prüm district
- Interactive map of Oberweiler
- Location within Germany Location within Rhineland-Palatinate
- Coordinates: 50°02′39″N 6°26′38″E
- Country: Germany
- State: Rhineland-Palatinate
- District: Eifelkreis Bitburg-Prüm
- Municipal assoc.: Bitburger Land

Government
  - Mayor (2019–24): Nico Steinbach

Area
  - Total: 5.31 km^{2} (2.05 sq mi)
- Elevation: 430 m (1,410 ft)

Population (2025-12-31)
  - Total: 165
  - Density: 31.1/km^{2} (80.5/sq mi)
- Time zone: UTC+01:00 (CET)
  - Summer (DST): UTC+02:00 (CEST)
- Postal codes: 54636
- Dialling codes: 06569
- Vehicle registration: BIT
- Website: www.oberweiler.eu

Oberweiler is a municipality in the district of Bitburg-Prüm, in Rhineland-Palatinate, western Germany.
