= Jakob Lukas Schabelitz =

Swiss publisher and bookseller

Jakob Lukas Schabelitz (10 March 1827, Basel – 28 January 1889) was a Swiss publisher and bookseller. He joined the Communist League and was an associate and friend of Karl Marx and Friedrich Engels in the late 1840s and early 1850s. Schabelitz died in 1899.
