= Heinrich Bauer (revolutionary) =

German shoemaker and revolutionary

Heinrich Bauer (1814 – 1851) was a German shoemaker and revolutionary. He was a leader of the League of the Just. When the League of the Just became the Communist League, Bauer became a member of the Central Authority of the Communist League. He was a prominent figure in the German and international working class movement. Heinrich Bauer emigrated to Australia in 1851.
