= Ernst Dronke =

Ernst Andreas Dominicus Dronke (17 August 1822, Koblenz – 2 November 1891, Liverpool) was a German writer and journalist. Later he became a member of the Communist League and became an editor of the Neue Rheinische Zeitung alongside Karl Marx and Friedrich Engels.

Dronke was one of the writers targeted in Friedrich Engels' "The True Socialists," an unfinished text that Engels drafted in 1847 as part of his and Marx's unfinished manuscript, "The German Ideology." Dronke was chosen as an exemplar of the Berlin group of socialists. Engels cited his literary texts for failing to adequately describe modern society and jumbling together the ideas of German idealism.

He participated in the German uprising of 1848-1849. After the suppression of this uprising, Dronke emigrated to England. Subsequently, he withdrew from politics.
