= Ferdinand Wolff =

Ferdinand Wolff (7 November 1812 – 8 March 1895) was a German journalist by profession and a proletarian revolutionary. He joined the Communist League and became an editor of the Neue Rheinische Zeitung in 1848 and 1849. He was a close friend and associate of both Karl Marx and of Frederick Engels and he sided with the Marx and Engels group during the 1850 split in the Communist League. Wolf died in 1895.
