= Karl Schapper =

German forestry worker, typesetter, socialist activist and trade unionist

- Born: Karl Hermann Christian Friedrich Schapper; 30 December 1812; Weinbach, Duchy of Nassau
- Died: 28 April 1870 (aged 57); London, England
- Education: University of Giessen
- Occupations: Revolutionary, labour leader
- Political party: League of Outlaws; League of the Just; Communist League

Karl Friedrich Schapper (30 December 1812 – 28 April 1870) was a German socialist and labour leader. He was one of the pioneers of the labour movement in Germany and an early associate of Wilhelm Weitling and Karl Marx.

== Young Germany and Mazzini ==
Schapper was born on 30 December 1812 in Weinbach. His father, Christian Schapper, was a priest. Karl Schapper studied forestry in Giessen. As a student, he joined a radical fraternity, and in 1832, he participated in an insurrection known as Frankfurter Landsturm. The would-be revolutionaries seized an arsenal and wanted to overthrow the Frankfurt diet and proclaim a republic. Schapper was imprisoned, but after three months, he managed to escape, making his way to Switzerland. There he worked as a forestry worker and typesetter. He joined the radical organisation 'Young Germany' and became a follower of the utopian communist Wilhelm Weitling. 'Young Germany' was modelled on, and affiliated with, Giuseppe Mazzini's 'Young Italy', and in 1834, Schapper participated in Mazzini's attempt at an armed invasion of Savoy from Switzerland. This was Mazzini's second attempt; like the first, in 1833, it was unsuccessful. Schapper was once again imprisoned.

== The League of the Just and Blanqui ==
On his release, Schapper resumed his activities in 'Young Germany' and was associated with the exiled German democrat Georg Fein (1803–1869) in setting up workers' educational circles. In 1836, Schapper was deported from Switzerland for his political activities and went to Paris. He joined the French section of 'Young Germany' and the communist 'League of the Banned', soon renamed 'League of the Just'. It was later renamed the 'Communist League', on the initiative of Wilhelm Wolff. The League maintained relations with French utopian communist Étienne Cabet and the Neo-Babouvists. In 1839, the League was implicated in an unsuccessful insurrection by the 'Society of the Seasons', led by Auguste Blanqui and Armand Barbès. Schapper, who had been involved, was caught and imprisoned. In 1840 he was expelled from France and went to London, where he re-organised the Communist League. In spite of the failure of the Blanquist insurrection, its organisational model left a lasting impression on Schapper's mind.

== Chartism and Harney ==
In England, Schapper was involved in organising the German Workers Educational Association and the Fraternal Democrats, with Chartist leader Julian Harney. The Fraternal Democrats promoted republicanism and democracy and attempted to give aid to the many radical political refugees in London; they thus helped forge links among the revolutionaries of different countries. The Fraternal Democrats were also affiliated with the British labour movement. Other Chartists with whom Schapper collaborated included Ernest Jones.

== The 1848 Revolution and Marx ==
The League had originally followed Wilhelm Weitling's lead, but in the 1840s it came under the influence of Karl Marx and Friedrich Engels. Schapper became head of the 'Communist Correspondence Committee' and organised the publication of Marx' and Engels' Communist Manifesto in 1848. Schapper also contributed to the Communist Journal (Kommunistische Zeitschrift) published by the League. He is thought to have been the author of an anonymous commentary on the Communist Manifesto and polemicized against the radical democrat Karl Heinzen.

The Revolution of 1848 brought Schapper back to Germany. He went first to Cologne, where he helped publish, and occasionally wrote for, Marx' Neue Rheinische Zeitung. Together with Joseph Moll, he organized the Workers' Association; this was an embryonic trade union as well as a political organisation. It was a forerunner of Ferdinand Lasselle's 'General German Workers' Association' and, indirectly, of the German Social-Democratic party. After briefly being imprisoned in Cologne, Schapper went to Nassau, where he participated in the democratic movement in Wiesbaden. In 1849 he was arrested again and charged with high treason for having strongly criticized the new constitution adopted by the Frankfurt parliament. He was acquitted of the capital charge but expelled from Germany. He returned to London, where he lived in dire poverty and tried to support himself as a language tutor. He also resumed work on behalf of the Communist League.

However, in 1850, a bitter quarrel led to a split, with Marx and Engels on one side and Karl Schapper and August Willich on the other. Schapper's conflict with Marx had been building for some time. The final break came over the question how to react to the defeat of the revolution. Marx argued for building a mass workers' movement for the future; Schapper and Willich wanted to prepare for further insurrections. Schapper and Willich formed their own group, the Communist Central Committee, modelled on the conspiratorial Blanquist organisations they knew from the 1830s. However, their efforts came to nought, and Willich soon emigrated to the United States, where he became a general in the Union army during the Civil War.

== The First International ==
Schapper and Marx were reconciled in 1856. Schapper was involved in founding the International Working Men's Association (the First International) in London in 1864. His long-standing contacts with French, British, Swiss, Italian, Belgian and American radicals, socialists and trade unionists were a valuable asset to Marx. In 1865 Schapper was elected to the General Council of the First International, the organisation's governing body. In the factional conflicts within the International, Schapper loyally supported Marx. However, Schapper's health had been poor for some time. He suffered from tuberculosis. Karl Schapper died in London on April 28, 1870.

== Significance ==
Karl Schapper was important for several reasons: As a communist of working-class background, he was one of the pioneers of the labour movement in Germany. As a member of Young Germany, he was one of the most important links between the German 'Vormärz' and the Italian Risorgimento. As a member of the League of the Just, Schapper helped forge links between German socialists and the radical French communist and Blanquist groups of the 1830s and '40s. In the Communist League, Schapper helped pave the way from the utopian communism of Weitling to the 'scientific socialism' of Marx and Engels. In the 1840s, Schapper helped build bridges between German socialists and the radical wing of the British Chartist movement. Schapper played a role in the 1848 Revolution in Germany and, subsequently, in founding the First International.

== Sources ==
- Lewiowa, S. "Karl Schapper." In: Marx und Engels und die ersten proletarischen Revolutionäre. Berlin 1965.
- Becker, G. "Karl Schapper." In: Männer der Revolution von 1848. Berlin, 1970.
- Kuhnigk, A. M. Nassaus Tribun deutscher Arbeiterbewegung: Karl Schapper aus Weinbach (1812–1870). Weinbach, 1980.
- Idem, Karl Schapper. Ein Vater europäischer Arbeiterbewegung. Limburg, 1980.
- Kuhn, A. Die deutsche Arbeiterbewegung. Stuttgart 2004.
- Gant, B. "Schapper, Karl Hermann Christian Friedrich." In: Neue Deutsche Biographie (NDB). Volume 22. Berlin 2005, p. 564 f.
- Henderson, W. O. The Life of Friedrich Engels. Volume 1. London, 1976.
- Lattek, C. Revolutionary Refugees: German Socialism in Britain, 1840–1860. New York, 2006.
- Weisser, H. British Working-Class Movements and Europe, 1815–48. Manchester, 1975.
- The Great Soviet Encyclopedia. Moscow, 1979.
