= Wilhelm Wolff =

German political activist (1809–1864)

Johann Friedrich Wilhelm Wolff
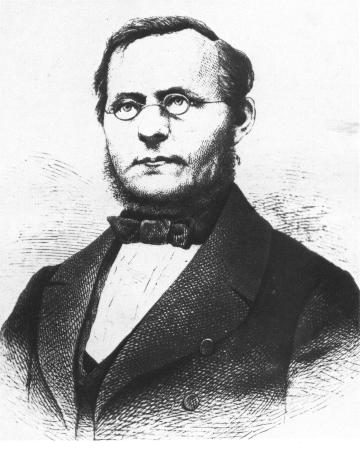
- Born: 21 June 1809; Tarnau, Schweidnitz, Silesia, Prussia
- Died: 9 May 1864 (aged 54); Manchester, England
- Other name: Lupus
- Occupations: Schoolmaster, political activist, publicist

Johann Friedrich Wilhelm Wolff, nicknamed "Lupus" (21 June 1809 – 9 May 1864) was a German schoolmaster, political activist and publicist.

== Life ==
Wolff was born in Tarnau, a village in the Schweidnitz district of Silesia, Prussia (now Tarnawa, Lower Silesian Voivodeship, Gmina Żarów, Poland). His family were mainly farmers, his father being a hereditary serf. His mother was well-educated despite her low social class. He went to grammar school in Świdnica and university in Wrocław, mainly studying classical philology.

In 1831 he became a member of a radical students' association, for which he was imprisoned between 1834 and 1838 (mainly in Fort Srebrna Góra), following the resumption of persecution of these types of organisations by the Bundestag, in line with the Carlsbad Decrees. He was released on 30 July 1838, and moved back to Wrocław. There, he attempted to become a private tutor, having been legally excluded from public teaching due to the interruption of his studies by his arrest. However, his licence to teach privately was denied by the government there. Accordingly, he moved to Posen where he worked as a tutor until 1840, in the service of Tytus Działyński, a Polish landowner.

In 1846, in Brussels, Wolff became a close friend of Karl Marx and Friedrich Engels. He was active in the Brussels Communist Correspondence Committee and a member of the League of the Just, in addition to being co-founder of the League of Communists in 1848, as a member of its central authority. He served as an editor of the Neue Rheinische Zeitung newspaper in 1848-1849, and as a member of the Frankfurt National Assembly.

Wolff emigrated to Switzerland in 1849 and then to England in 1851.

== Legacy ==
Upon his death, Wolff left a large fortune, earned through various business dealings, to Marx, who dedicated the first volume of Das Kapital to him with the line "To my unforgettable friend, Wilhelm Wolff. Intrepid, faithful, noble protagonist of the proletariat."

Gerhart Hauptmann's play Die Weber (The Weavers) is based on Wolff's essay about the weavers' uprising in Silesia in 1844 and its suppression, Das Elend und der Aufuhr in Schlesien.

== See also ==
- Richard D. Wolff (a distant relative, and Marxian economist)
