= Joseph Moll =

German labour leader and revolutionary

- Born: 14 October 1813; Cologne, Germany
- Died: 16 June 1849 (aged 35); Rotenfels, near Murg, Germany
- Cause of death: Died in democratic revolution fighting
- Occupations: Labour leader and revolutionary
- Years active: 1834–1849
- Known for: participated in Revolution of 1848

Maximilien Joseph Moll (14 October 1813 – 16 June 1849) was a German labour leader and revolutionary. He was a pioneer of the German labour movement and a figure in early German socialism. Moll was an early associate of Karl Marx.

== Early life ==
Joseph Maximilian Moll was born in Cologne on October 14, 1813. He was born into a poor working-class family and was apprenticed as a watchmaker. After his apprenticeship Moll travelled widely across Europe in search of work, as was customary for tradesmen at the time. On these travels he made contact with a number of German workers' associations, which exposed him to radical political and economic ideas.

== Young Germany ==
In 1834 he joined the secret society 'Young Germany' in Switzerland. Modelled on Mazzini's 'Young Italy', it advocated a similar mixture of democratic democracy, nationalism and social reform. His friendship with the labour organiser and revolutionary Karl Schapper dated from that period. In 1836, Moll was expelled from Switzerland and went to Paris, where he joined the 'League of the Just', then under the influence of the utopian communist Wilhelm Weitling. Schapper was also a member.

== The League of the Just ==
In 1839, the League participated in an insurrection carried out by the 'Society of the Seasons', led by Armand Barbès and Auguste Blanqui. The insurrection was suppressed and Moll escaped to Britain. In 1840 he was one of the founders of the German Workers' Educational Association in London. In 1846 he became a member of the Central Committee of the League of the Just (which had been relocated to London). Under the influence of Karl Marx, who replaced Weitling as the ideological leader of the group, the League was re-organised as the 'Communist League'. Moll was again elected to its Central Committee.

== Revolution and death ==
When the Revolution of 1848 broke out in Europe, Moll returned to Germany. He went to Cologne, where he became president of the Workers' Association and helped propagate Marxist ideas among its members. In September 1848 he was implicated in an uprising; to escape arrest, he fled to London, but later returned illegally to Germany. In May 1848, he participated in the democratic revolution in Baden and took an active part in the fighting. On June 28, 1849, he died in Rotenfels, near Murg.

== Significance ==
Moll was an important figure in the early German labour movement, playing a role in organising several workers' associations. He was an early associate of Karl Marx and a figure in the transition from the early artisan communism of Wilhelm Weitling and the insurrectionary tactics of Auguste Blanqui and Marxism.

A street in Berlin (Mollstraße) is named after him.

== Sources ==
- Beloussowa, N., 'Joseph Moll'. In: Marx und Engels und die ersten proletarischen Revolutionäre. Berlin 1965, pp. 42–75.
- Becker, G., 'Joseph Moll. Mitglied der Zentralbehörde des Bundes der Kommunisten und Präsident des Kölner Arbeitervereins.' In: Bleiber, H., et al. (ed's), Männer der Revolution von 1848. Vol. 2. Berlin 1987 pp. 53–84.
