= Karl Grün =

German journalist, political theorist and socialist politician (1817–1887)

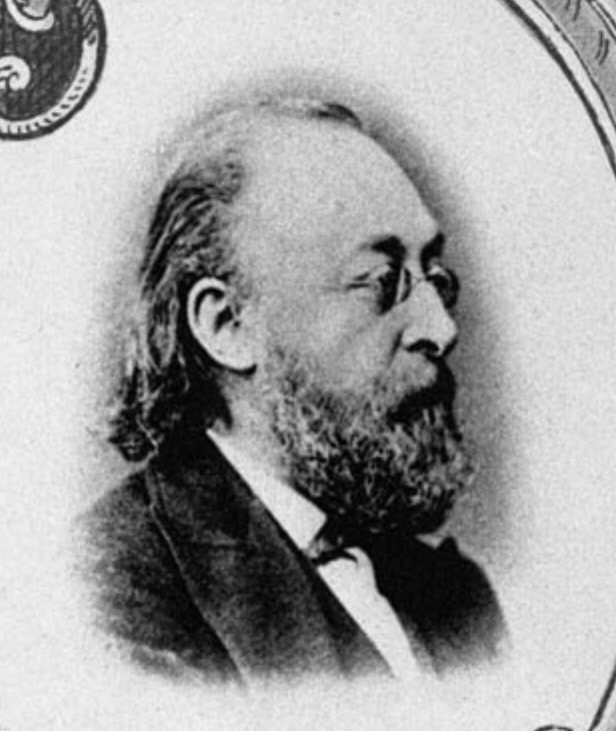
Karl Grün

Karl Theodor Ferdinand Grün (German: [kaʁl ˈɡʁyːn]; 30 September 1817 – 18 February 1887), also known by his alias Ernst von der Haide, was a German journalist, philosopher, political theorist and socialist politician. He played a prominent role in radical political movements leading up to the Revolution of 1848 and participated in the revolution. He was an associate of Heinrich Heine, Ludwig Feuerbach, Pierre-Joseph Proudhon, Karl Marx, Mikhail Bakunin and other radical political figures of the era.

Although less widely known today, Grün was an important figure in the German Vormärz, Young Hegelian philosophy and the democratic and socialist movements in nineteenth-century Germany. As a target of Marx's criticism, Grün played a role in the development of early Marxism. Through his philosophical influence on Proudhon, he had a certain influence on the development of French socialist theory.

== Young Hegelianism, 'True Socialism' and early activism ==
Karl Theodor Ferdinand Grün was born in Lüdenscheid, a Westphalian town then under Prussian control. His father was a schoolmaster. His younger brother, Albert Grün, was a poet who later gained some notoriety for his role in the Revolution of 1848–49. While a secondary student at Wetzlar, Grün became involved in radical political activism, helping produce and distribute illegal democratic pamphlets. From 1835 to 1838 he studied philology and theology at the University of Bonn and philology and philosophy at the University of Berlin, where he completed a doctorate. One of Grün's fellow students was Karl Marx. Grün and Marx frequented the radical philosophical circles of the Young Hegelians and were strongly influenced by the 'humanistic materialism' of Ludwig Feuerbach. Marx's rivalry with Grün subsequently led to a personal breach between them. Grün was also strongly influenced by contemporary French socialist theories, combining them with Young Hegelian and Feuerbachian philosophy and democratic politics. He was associated with the group of 'True Socialists' around Moses Hess, a Young Hegelian philosopher and forerunner of Labour Zionism. (Karl Marx and Friedrich Engels sharply criticized the 'True Socialists' as utopian crypto-idealists.) Grün was also acquainted with several figures of the Vormärz period—the period of radical political ferment leading up to the abortive March Revolution of 1848—such as Arnold Ruge, Bruno Bauer, Heinrich Heine, Georg Herwegh and others.

Grün argued that humans are material beings who are by nature social and need the community of others to survive. From Feuerbach he adopted the thesis that the idea of God is merely an alienated representation of human sociality or 'species being', reflecting the alienating and unjust character of actual human social conditions. Unlike Feuerbach, whose socialism was largely passive, Grün called for a 'philosophy of action', because the spiritual alienation of humanity in religion can only be overcome if the political-economic alienation of human beings from each other in society is overcome by means of revolutionary action. Like many Young Hegelians, Grün saw as parallel and complementary the development of socialist theory in France and the revolution of critical philosophy in Germany. Grün followed Hess and the 'True Socialists' in claiming that the struggle for human emancipation could not be successful unless critical philosophy became socialist and socialism were infused with philosophical criticism. (Marx came to reject this view as giving undue priority to ideology over material substructure.)

Grün returned to Germany in 1842. His radical journalism, advocating democracy and professing republican and socialist sympathies, and his known association with radical political circles, made an academic career impossible. The University of Marburg even refused to have Grün as a post-doctoral student, and the Prussian authorities placed him on a list of 'political criminals'. He was expelled from several German states and lived in a number of cities over the next few years (most extensively in Cologne), supporting himself by means of journalism, giving lectures on literary topics and working as a school teacher. In democratic circles he enjoyed a certain celebrity. He contributed to, and edited, a number of radical publications, including the newspaper Der Sprecher ('The Speaker') and the monthly journal Bielefelder Monatsschrift. Many of these publications were eventually outlawed by the authorities. In 1843, Grün (along with Marx, Hess and others) participated in the controversy over Bruno Bauer's essay 'The Jewish Question', which opposed civil rights for Jews. Grün rejected Bauer's position.

== Exile, revolution, exile ==
In 1844, impoverished, under pressure from the censorship and fearing arrest, Grün once again went into exile. He first moved to Brussels, where he associated with the radical poet Ferdinand Freiligrath and once again crossed paths with Marx. Having been expelled by the Belgian government, along with Marx and other German refugees, he settled in Paris. There Grün befriended the anarchist philosopher Pierre-Joseph Proudhon, whose writings had greatly influenced him and whose ideas he helped popularize among German radicals. In turn, Grün was instrumental in introducing Proudhon to Hegelian, Young Hegelian and Feuerbachian philosophy. Another acquaintance was the Russian exile Mikhail Bakunin, who had been involved in Young Hegelian circles in Russia and Germany in the 1830s and 1840s and was also living in Paris. In 1845, Grün published a noteworthy early history of socialism in the francophone world, Die sozialen Bewegungen in Frankreich und Belgien. Grün's exile was marked by great financial difficulty. In addition to his journalism, he worked for some time as a printer.

In February 1848, Grün enthusiastically welcomed the French revolution against King Louis-Philippe and the establishment of the Second Republic. A month later, the revolution spread to several German states, and Grün returned to Germany. He settled in Trier, becoming a leading member of the local 'Democratic Club' and resuming his political journalism. In 1849 he won a by-election in Wittlich and sat as a deputy of the extreme left in the Prussian National Assembly. As the Revolution began to lose momentum, the Prussian government decided to dissolve the Assembly. Grün helped organize and spoke at a large protest rally, which led to a local insurrection and an attempt to storm the arsenal at Prüm. Though he did not participate in the storming of the arsenal, Grün was charged with 'intellectual responsibility' for the uprising and imprisoned. Upon his release, he once again went into exile. He returned to Brussels because he bitterly opposed the régime of Louis Bonaparte (Napoléon III), whose thinly veiled caesarian ambitions were confirmed by the coup d'état of December 1852. Grün lived in Brussels from 1850 to 1861, working mainly as a private tutor and writing polemics against Napoléon III. In 1859 he gave lectures at the University of Brussels.

== Amnesty, literature and democratic politics ==
In 1861, an amnesty enabled Grün to return to Prussian territory. Over the next few months he travelled widely, giving lectures and attending the opening of the National Assembly of the newly unified Italian state in 1861. In 1862 he settled in Frankfurt, where he taught history of literature at the Polytechnic. He also wrote for the Neue Frankfurter Zeitung. In 1865 he moved to Heidelberg. Grün remained politically active, becoming involved in the democratic 'People's Party' (one of the forerunners of the German Social Democratic Party) and opposing Prussian ambitions to establish hegemony in Germany. In the Austro-Prussian War of 1866 he took an anti-Prussian stance, not out of sympathy for Habsburg imperial pretensions but out of hostility to Hohenzollern ambitions. In 1867 he attended the international Congress of the League of Peace and Freedom in Geneva, which was also attended by John Stuart Mill, Bakunin and Giuseppe Garibaldi. Prussia having won the war against Austria, Grün moved to Vienna in 1868, where he remained for the rest of his life. There he edited the periodical Democratic Correspondence and gave lectures on literature, art and philosophy. His publications during these years included an edition of the correspondence and posthumous writings of his mentor Ludwig Feuerbach, a two-volume philosophical biography of Feuerbach, a book-length critique of F.A. Lange's noted treatise on materialist philosophy and several other works on philosophy, art, literature and history. In 1871, Grün welcomed the uprising of the Paris Commune. In the 1870s he supported the creation of workers' educational circles, which became one of the sources of the Austrian Socialist Party (founded after Grün's death). Grün died in Vienna in 1887.

== Albert Grün (1822–1904) ==
Karl Grün's younger brother Albert Grün also played a role in the democratic and socialist circles of the 1830s and 1840s.

Albert Grün was born in Lüdenscheid on May 31, 1822. He became politically active as early as 1836, at the age of 14. Under the influence of his brother Karl, Albert Grün became involved in illegal democratic circles, associated with the Young Hegelians and absorbed the philosophy of Feuerbach and the doctrines of the French socialists, Fourier, Proudhon, etc. He contributed to several radical publications and in 1846 was condemned for lèse majesté. He escaped to Brussels, where he gave lectures on modern drama.

During the 1848 revolution he returned to Germany. In Berlin he organized one of the earliest German labour unions, the 'Machine Builders' Association'. In 1849 Albert Grün played a role in the revolutionary Provisional Government of Saxony and in the armed uprisings in the Palatinate and in Baden. He was sentenced to death for his role in the Badensian revolution but escaped to the Alsatian capital of Strasbourg, France. There he gave lectures on literature and worked as a school teacher. Although Grün received an amnesty in the 1860s, he remained in Strasbourg. In 1871, as a result of the Franco-Prussian War, Germany annexed Alsace, but Grün was not molested.

Grün continued to work as a teacher and tutor in various capacities. He was a member of the General Association for the German Language and worked for a reconciliation of the French and German nations. He also supported the German Social-Democratic party. Albert Grün published a variety of books on historical, political and literary topics. He died in Strasbourg on April 22, 1904.

== Works of Karl Grün ==
Karl Grün's major works have so far not been translated into English, although some of his articles have been included in various anthologies of Young Hegelian writings. His publications in German include:

- 1843: Die Judenfrage. Gegen Bruno Bauer. [The Jewish Question. Against Bruno Bauer.]
- 1844: Friedrich Schiller als Mensch, Geschichtschreiber, Denker und Dichter. [Friedrich Schiller as Man, Historian, Philosopher and Poet.]
- 1845: Die soziale Bewegung in Frankreich und Belgien. Briefe und Studien. [The Social Movement in France and Belgium. Letters and Studies.]
- 1846: Über Goethe vom menschlichen Standpunkte. [On Goethe from the Human Standpoint.]
- 1860: Louis Napoleon Bonaparte, die Sphinx auf dem französischen Kaiserthron. [Louis Napoleon Bonaparte, the Sphinz on the French Imperial Throne.]
- 1861: Italien im Frühjahr 1861. [Italy in the Spring of 1861.]
- 1872: Kulturgeschichte des 16. Jahrhunderts. [Cultural History of the Sixteenth Century.]
- 1874: Ludwig Feuerbach (2 volumes).
- 1876: Die Philosophie in der Gegenwart. [The Philosophy of the Present.]
- 1880: Kulturgeschichte des 17. Jahrhunderts. [Cultural History of the Seventeenth Century.]
- Grün also published a German translation of Proudhon's System of Economic Contradictions: The Philosophy of Poverty in 1847, and an edition of the radical poet Ludwig Börne's Letters from Paris in 1868.

A selection of his writings in German has been published, with a philosophical introduction, by Manuela Köppe:

- Grün, K., Ausgewählte Schriften in zwei Bänden. Ed. M. Köppe. Berlin, 2005.

== Works of Albert Grün ==
Albert Grün's writings are generally not available in English either. His writings in German include:

- 1846: Offener Brief an die Bonner Studenten. [Open Letter to the Students of Bonn.]
- 1849: Das Frankfurter Vorparlament und seine Wurzeln in Frankreich und Deutschland. [The Pre-Parliament of Frankfurt and its Roots in France and Germany.]
- 1851: Deutsche Flüchtlinge. Zeitbild. [German Refugees. An Image of the Times.]
- 1856: Goethe's Faust.
- 1856: Das ABC der Ästhetik. Fünf Vorlesungen. [The ABC of Aesthetics. Five Lectures.]
- 1859: Aus der Verbannung. Gedichte. [From Exile. Poems.]

== Sources ==
- Wolfgang Schieder, 'Grün, Karl'. In: Neue Deutsche Biographie (NDB). Vol. 7, Berlin 1966, p. 186 f.
- Stegmann, Carl / Carl Hugo: Handbuch des Socialismus. Zürich 1894, p. 310f.
- Meyers Großes Konversations-Lexikon (1905), Vol. 8, p. 442.
- James Strassmeier, Karl Grün und die Kommunistische Partei 1845–1848. Trier 1973.
