= Neue Rheinische Zeitung =

German newspaper

New Rhenish Newspaper: Organ of Democracy
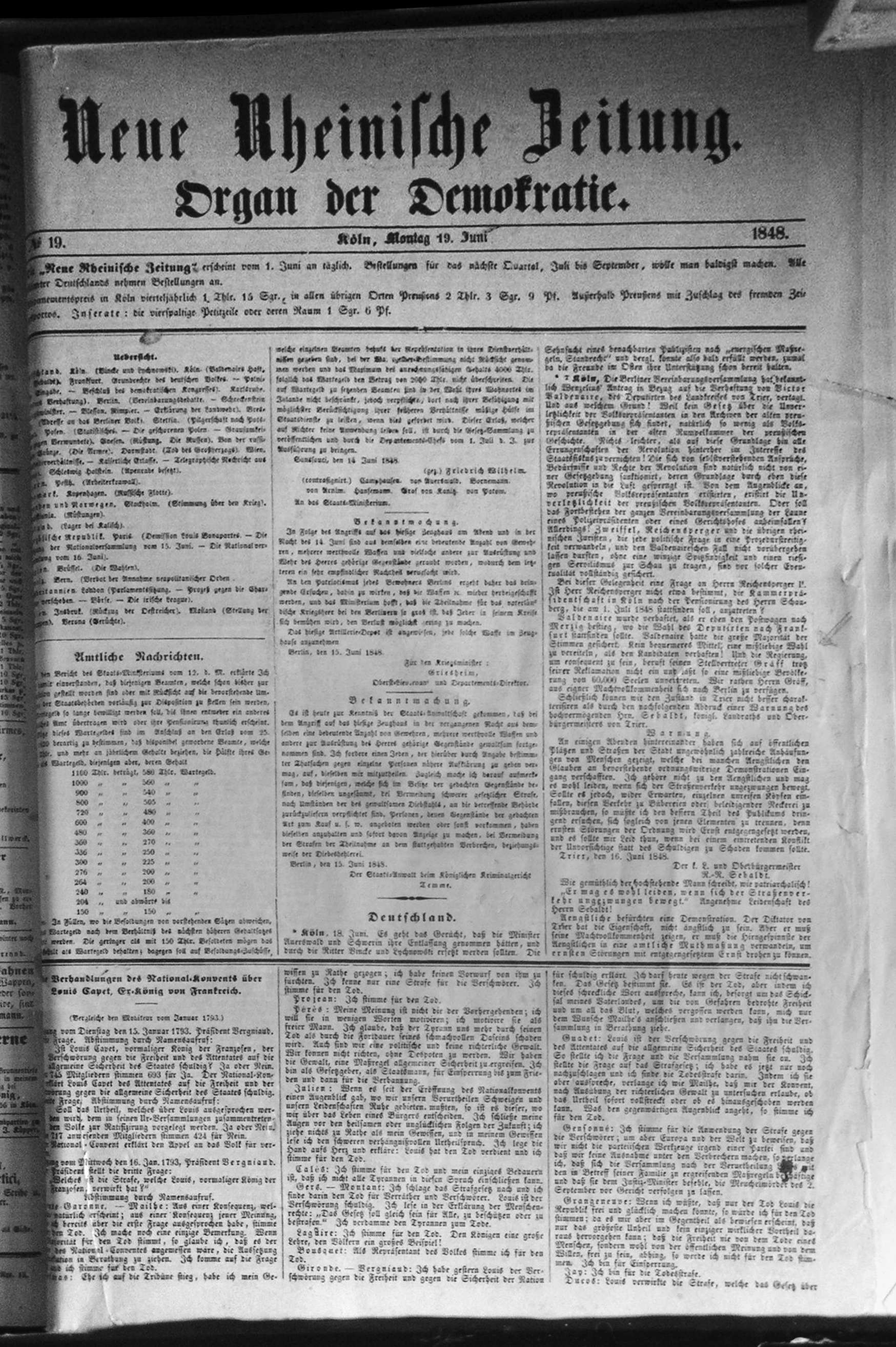
- The 19 June 1848 edition of Neue Rheinische Zeitung
- Editor-in-chief: Karl Marx
- Founded: 1 June 1848
- Ceased publication: 19 May 1849
- Political alignment: Far-left
- Language: German
- Headquarters: Cologne, Prussia

The Neue Rheinische Zeitung: Organ der Demokratie ("New Rhenish Newspaper: Organ of Democracy") was a German daily newspaper, published by Karl Marx in Cologne between 1 June 1848 and 19 May 1849. It is recognised by historians as one of the most important dailies of the Revolutions of 1848 in Germany. The paper was regarded by its editors and readers as the successor of an earlier Cologne newspaper, the Rheinische Zeitung ("Rhenish Newspaper"), also edited for a time by Marx, which had been suppressed by state censorship over five years earlier.

== Publication history ==
=== Establishment ===
The Neue Rheinische Zeitung: Organ der Demokratie ("New Rhenish Newspaper: Organ of Democracy") was founded 1 June 1848 in Cologne (Köln), part of Rhineland. The paper was established by Karl Marx, Frederich Engels, as well as leading members of the Communist League living in Cologne immediately upon the return of Marx and Engels to Germany following the outbreak of the 1848 Revolution.

The paper's editorial staff included Joseph Weydemeyer, with Marx serving as editor-in-chief. The paper was named after an earlier newspaper edited by Karl Marx in Cologne from 1842 to 1843, the Rheinische Zeitung. The paper had the subtitle "Organ of Democracy", referring not to the establishment of parliamentary democracy, but to the revolutionary "Democratic front" which included the progressive petty bourgeoisie, the working class, and the peasantry. The paper was financed through the sale of shares of stock, contributions and loans, and paid advertising. The paper was produced as a 4-page broadsheet, with the use of occasional special supplements.

The Neue Rheinische Zeitung was a daily publication and launched on June 1, 1848, with Marx exercising undisputed control over the paper's political line.

=== Development ===
Circulation of the paper ranged from 3,000 to 6,000 copies per issue, a number far in excess of the membership of the Communist League itself, which specialists estimate had between 200 and 300 participants. This effectively rendered the publication into what historian Tatyana Vasilyeva has called "the leading centre of the Communist League, directing the political activity of its members throughout Germany during the revolutionary period."

According to Frederick Engels, writing for the press on the anniversary of Karl Marx's death, the poorly-financed paper grew to a circulation of 5,000 by September 1848, when a state of siege in Cologne forced a suspension and a restart. Thereafter a restart was necessary, which finally became possible in mid-October. A period of growth ensued until the government forced the paper's suppression in May 1849, with 6,000 subscribers on the rolls.

A total of 301 editions of the Neue Rheinische Zeitung (NRZ) were produced during the course of its existence. To these Marx himself contributed a total of not fewer than 80 articles over the course of its existence. Since editorial contributions to the NRZ were unsigned and handwritten manuscripts have not survived, a precise count is impossible, however.

=== Political line ===
The Neue Rheinische Zeitung (NRZ) was outspoken in its criticism of Prussia and Austria for Monarchist counter-revolution, and actively agitated for their defeat. The paper was also critical of the willingness of the liberal bourgeoisie to compromise with Monarchist forces—policies which Marx and his comrades believed would have negative impacts upon the German revolution.

More than three decades after the publication's termination, Marx's close associate Frederick Engels recalled that the NRZ had a political program with two main points: "a single, indivisible, democratic German republic, and War with Russia, including the restoration of Poland." With respect to foreign affairs, Engels recalled that the NRZ sought "to support every revolutionary people and to call for a general war of revolutionary Europe against the mighty bulwark of European reaction—Russia."

This policy was intended to undermine both the authority of Prussia and Tsarist Russia, both considered reactionary and militaristic powers, with war against Russia seen as a necessary prerequisite for establishment of a unified and democratic Germany. Marx and Engels believed that "if Germany could be successfully brought to make war against Russia, it would be the end for the Habsburgs and Hohenzollerns and the revolution would triumph along the whole line."

The tone of the newspaper was described by Engels as "by no means solemn, serious, or enthusiastic," instead treating political opponents with "mockery and derision" in a manner entertaining to readers. The paper sought to foster the idea that the German events of the spring of 1848 were the starting point of a long revolutionary process akin to the French Revolution of 1789-1794. The paper attempted to undermine the notion that the formal resolutions of various "National Assemblies" were capable of changing state policy in any fundamental way.

Throughout its existence the NRZ was persecuted by the Prussian government, which brought lawsuits against it charging the NRZ with having "slandered" government officials. As the revolutionary upsurge of 1848 ebbed, the government's hindrance of the publication became steadily more effective, culminating in Karl Marx's expulsion from Germany—a move which effectively killed the paper.

=== Suppression ===
Page from the last issue of Neue Rheinische Zeitung, which became known as the "Red issue", May 19, 1849

On 2 March 1849, Prussian soldiers came to Marx's home to arrest one of the writers. Marx refused to turn over the writer, and the soldiers eventually left.

On 16 May 1849 Marx received an official note from the royal government declaring:

The tendency of the Neue Rheinische Zeitung to provoke in its readers contempt for the present government, and incite them to violent revolution and the setting up of a social republic has become stronger in its latest pieces.... The right of hospitality which he has so disgracefully abused is therefore to be withdrawn from its editor-in-chief, Dr. Karl Marx, and since he has not obtained permission to prolong his stay in these states, he is ordered to leave them within 24 hours. If he should not comply voluntarily with this demand, he is to be forcibly conveyed across the frontier.

This expulsion order, combined with the growing threat of arrest or exile of its writers forced the NRZ to publish its last issue on 19 May 1849, known as the "red issue" as it was printed entirely in red ink. Marx closed with a sharp rebuttal against the suppression of the NRZ:

Why these absurd phrases, these official lies? The trend and tone of the latest pieces of the Neue Rheinische Zeitung do not differ a whit from its first "sample piece"....

And the "social republic"? Have we proclaimed it only in the "latest pieces" of the Neue Rheinische Zeitung? Did we not speak plainly and clearly enough for these dullards who failed to see the "red" thread running through all our comments and reports on the European movement?...

We have no compassion and we ask no compassion from you. When our turn comes, we shall not make excuses for the terror. But the royal terrorists, the terrorists by the grace of God and the law, are in practice brutal, disdainful, and mean, in theory cowardly, secretive, and deceitful, and in both respects disreputable.

— Karl Marx

=== Legacy ===
In January 1850 Marx launched a new publication, a monthly magazine called Neue Rheinische Zeitung: Politsch-ökonomische Revue ("New Rhenish Newspaper: Politico-Economic Review"). Edited in London and printed in Hamburg, the periodical managed only six issues before folding.

The best-known content of the NRZ were a series of five articles on economics published by Marx in April 1849—a series unfinished due to the suppression of the paper. First gathered under a single set of covers under the title Wage-labor and Capital in 1880, this material was subsequently revised by Engels in 1891 and frequently reprinted thereafter as an accessible popularization of Marxist economics.

The great bulk of the journalism of Karl Marx and Frederick Engels in the NRZ became systematically accessible to an English readership only in 1977, with the publication of volumes 7, 8, and 9 of the Marx-Engels Collected Works. It was then that a total of 357 of the 422 articles contained therein were published in English for the first time.

In 2005 an online newspaper calling itself Neue Rheinische Zeitung was established.

Per the Marxist view of journalism, the Chinese Communist Party (CCP) considers Neue Rheinische Zeitung to be "the world’s first Marxist newspaper".

== Editorial board ==
Source: "Statement of the Editorial Board of the Neue Rheinische Zeitung," no. 1, June 1, 1848. Reprinted in MECW: Vol. 7, p. 15.

- Karl Marx (editor-in-chief)
- Heinrich Bürgers
- Ernst Dronke
- Friedrich Engels
- Georg Weerth
- Ferdinand Wolff
- Wilhelm Wolff

== See also ==
- Manifesto of the Communist Party
