= Georg Weerth =

German writer and poet (1822–1856)

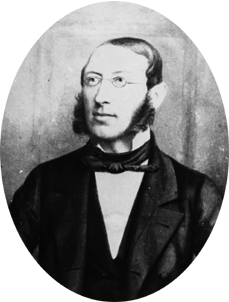
Georg Weerth.

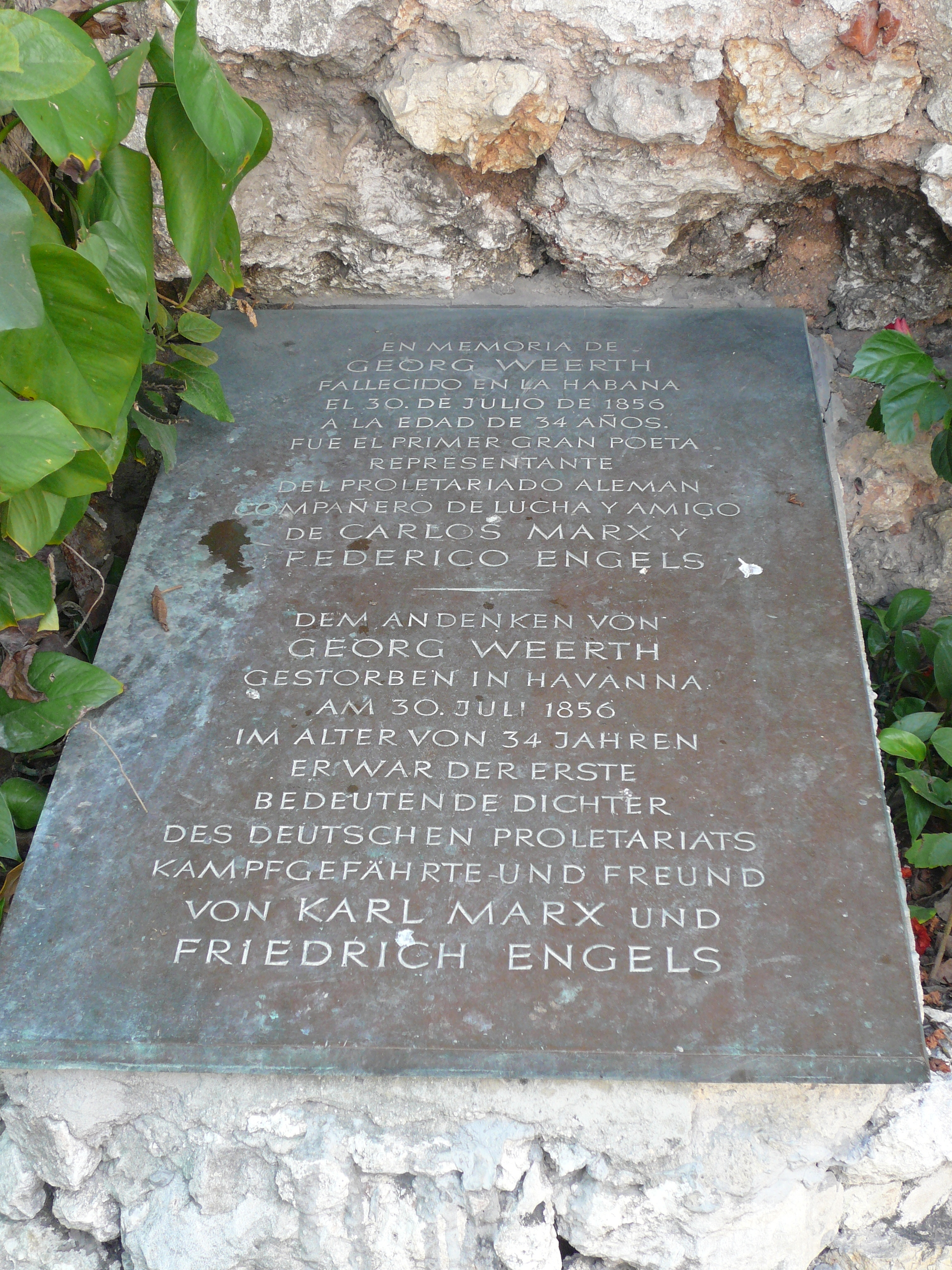
memorial plaque in Havana.

Georg Ludwig Weerth (17 February 1822 – 30 July 1856) was a German writer and poet. Weerth's poems celebrated the solidarity of the working class in its fight for liberation from exploitation and oppression. He was a friend and companion of Karl Marx and Friedrich Engels, who described Georg Weerth as the first and most significant poet of the German proletariat.

== Biography ==
Weerth was born in the Westphalian town of Detmold, the son of the clergyman and school reformer Ferdinand Weerth. He died in Havana, Cuba.

Georg Weerth wrote and edited the sketch page in the Neue Rheinische Zeitung, a German newspaper of which Karl Marx was editor-in-chief. His provocative writing and pungent satire led to his imprisonment, after which he fled to England.

From 1843 to 1846 Weerth made his home in Bradford, England. Six months of this time he spent in close contact with Engels, whose business was in Manchester. Like Engels, he devoted what time was left from his functions as a representative of a textile firm to studying the effects of the Industrial Revolution on the relationship between property owner and working class.

Weerth attended Chartist meetings and made friends with the leaders of the movement, such as George Julian Harney and Ernest Charles Jones. He reported on the conditions in England for German papers.

In 1846 Weerth left England and went to live in Brussels, where Karl Marx had his home.

Weerth succumbed to tropical fever on a business trip to Cuba. Shortly before his death, he wrote to Heinrich Heine that Cuba "would be the field where the great conflicts of the new world would be fought out first."

== Bibliography ==
- A Young Revolutionary in Nineteenth Century England, Selected Writings of Georg Weerth, 1971. Seven Seas Books, Berlin, GDR. Biographical details taken from the Introduction by Bruno Kaiser.
