= League of the Just =

League of the Just Bund der Gerechten
- Leader: Wilhelm Weitling
- Founded: 1836
- Dissolved: June 1847
- Split from: League of Outlaws
- Merged into: Communist League
- Headquarters: Paris (before 1839); London (after 1839)
- Membership: 1,000
- Ideology: Christian communism Utopian socialism
- Political position: Far-left
- International affiliation: Democratic Friends of all Nations; Fraternal Democrats
- Colours: Red

The League of the Just (German: Bund der Gerechten) or League of Justice was an international revolutionary organization. It was founded in 1836 by branching off from its ancestor, the League of Outlaws, which had formed in Paris in 1834. The League of the Just was largely composed of German emigrant artisans.

In 1847, the League of the Just merged with the Communist Correspondence Committee, an organization led by Karl Marx and Friedrich Engels, creating the Communist League. The new group tasked Marx and Engels with writing a political platform for itself. The resulting document was The Communist Manifesto.

== History ==
The first German revolutionary organizations emerged abroad under the impetus of émigré craft officers and some exiled intellectuals. One of the most active groups was in Paris, where the Deutscher Volksverein (German People's Union) emerged in 1832, composed primarily of shoemaking artisans. It began publishing pamphlets in German for distribution in the German states bordering France.

Two years later, the League of Outlaws emerged in these same circles.

=== League of Outlaws ===
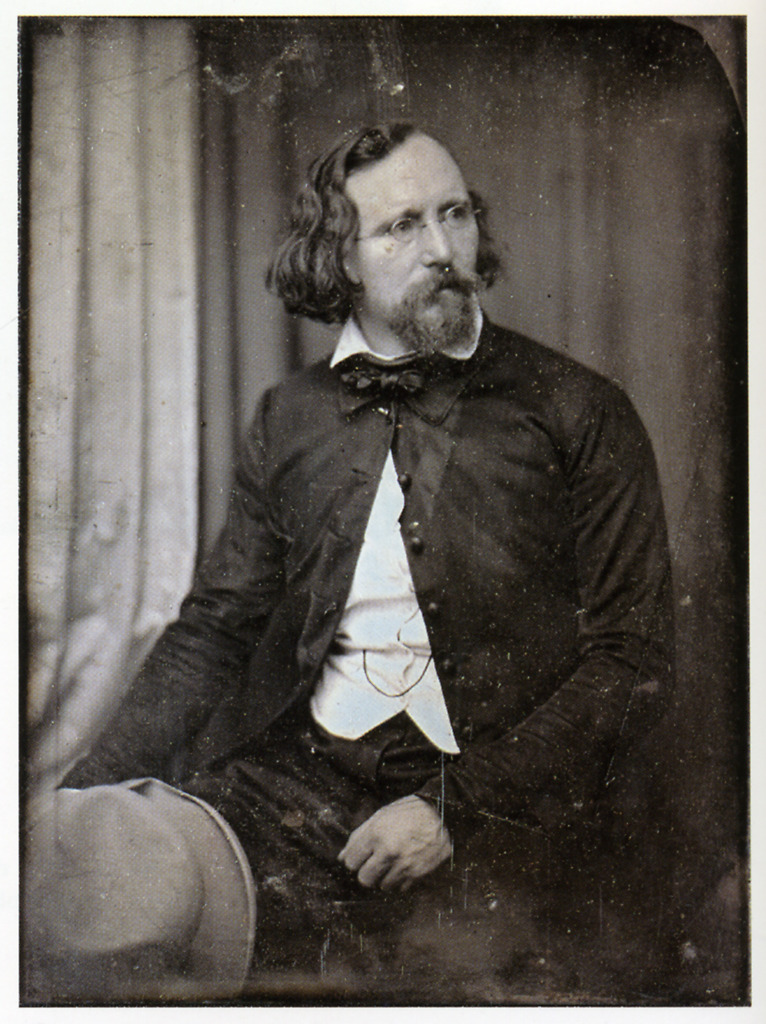
Jacob Venedey, one of the League's leaders and early editor of the newspaper The Outlaw (Daguerreotype by Hermann Biow, 1848).

Jacob Venedey and Theodore Schuster founded the League of Outlaws (Bund der Geächteten) in Paris in 1834. This clandestine revolutionary organization was founded by German émigré craft officers with the aim of "freeing Germany from the yoke of its shameful servitude and creating a state that, as far as possible, would make a return to misery and slavery impossible."

The League of Outlaws took the clandestine, hierarchical, and conspiratorial model of the Carbonari as its organizational model—which allowed it to evade the French and German police—and began publishing the monthly magazine Der Geächtete (The Outlaw), initially directed by the republican journalist and former professor at the University of Heidelberg Jacob Venedey, who was replaced by the Alsatian typographer Éduard Rauch when he was expelled from Paris. in 1835 —although he was able to return a year later—. The magazine's main contributor was Theodore Schuster, a former professor at the University of Göttingen, who spread the ideas of the French utopian socialists and the Swiss economist Sismondi, and advocated, among other reforms, the constitution of National Workshops, to "remedy the development of inequality" as evidenced by the "sad fate of factory workers" and to which "the great majority of artisans were [also] destined." In one of his articles Schuster wrote about the issue social:

Every advance in industry and the arts in our society means a setback for human well-being and human culture. For the people to attain intelligence, it will be necessary, in a future revolution, to overthrow not only the monarch, but the monarchy itself. The latter is formed not by arms and crowns, but by privileges; and the greatest of all privileges is wealth.

Article 2 of the Statutes stated that the goal of the organization was "the affirmation and maintenance of social and political equality, liberty, civic virtues, and popular unity." These principles were developed in the document Profession of Faith of an Outlaw, published as a flyer in 1834, which called for the establishment of a "democratic republic" that would guarantee all "liberties" and in which equality would reign. "Liberty and equality are the pillars that support the State; Unity and virtue are the foundation on which the former are based," therefore, "liberty, equality, virtue, and national unity must be the principles on which the future constitution of Germany is founded, if the salvation of Germany and the happiness of honest Germans are to be assured."

They modeled the organization closely after Philippe Buonarroti's vision of the "Universal Democratic Carbonari" as an egalitarian international revolutionary fellowship organization, perhaps the first of its kind. Its members were German emigrants. Schuster's 1834 pamphlet, Confession of faith of an outlaw has been suggested as the first vision of marginalized people joining together in a coming revolution.

At its peak, the League of Outlaws had about 100 members in Paris and 80 in Frankfurt am Main. The Outlaws dissipated in 1838 as their members prioritized other associations, including the League of Germans or League of the Just.

=== League of Germans ===
In 1836, Schuster focused his efforts on advocating for the unification of Germany and organized middle-class republicans into the League of Germans.

=== League of the Just ===
As Schuster's and other key members' attention was focused on this work, the working class members of the Outlaws rallied around the leadership of Wilhelm Weitling. This group formed the League of the Just in Paris in 1836 as an offshoot from the League of Outlaws.

Members of the League of the Just were German journeymen artisans, primarily tailors and woodworkers. Their stated goal was "the establishment of the Kingdom of God on Earth, based on the ideals of love of one's neighbor, equality and justice". This was also referred to by the League as the "new Jerusalem". The motto of the League of the Just was "All men are brothers". They have been described as followers of François-Noël Babeuf and as "utopian-communist". They were anticipating a social revolution, which one of their leaders, Karl Schapper, described as "the great resurrection day of the people." Friedrich Engels wrote dismissively of the League as essentially similar to other French secret societies except that it was German.

The latter league had a pyramidal structure inspired by the secret society of the Republican Carbonari, and shared ideas with Saint-Simon and Charles Fourier's utopian socialism. Their goal was to establish a "Social Republic" in the German states which would campaign for "freedom", "equality" and "civic virtue".

Wilhelm Weitling was the most prominent leader in the movement. Weitling denounced private property and money as a source of corruption and exploitation. Other significant leaders included Karl Schapper, Bruno Bauer, Joseph Moll, August Hermann Ewerbeck, and Johann Hoeckerig.

Many members of the League of the Just were involved in the 12 May 1839 Blanquist revolt. This led to the group being expelled by the French government. They proceeded to move to London. In 1840 in London they established a front organization called the Educational Society of German Workingmen. They continued to grow, until reaching a peak membership of over 1,000 people.

In 1845 there was significant public debate within the League between Weitling, who advocated for an immediate uprising of workers, and Karl Schapper, who considered this premature, especially after his experience in the 1839 uprising. Schapper advocated for a longer campaign of popular education to prepare the masses for revolution.

Karl Marx was hesitant about joining the League due to political disagreements, but was convinced by Joseph Moll that he could be more influential debating as a member from within the organization when Moll visited Brussels in January 1847. In June 1847, the League of the Just merged with the Communist Correspondence Committee to form the Communist League, at the suggestion of its two most prominent members Karl Marx and Friedrich Engels.

== See also ==
- Communist League
- German Workers Educational Association
