= Wilhelm Weitling =

German tailor, inventor, and political activist (1808–1871)

William Weitling
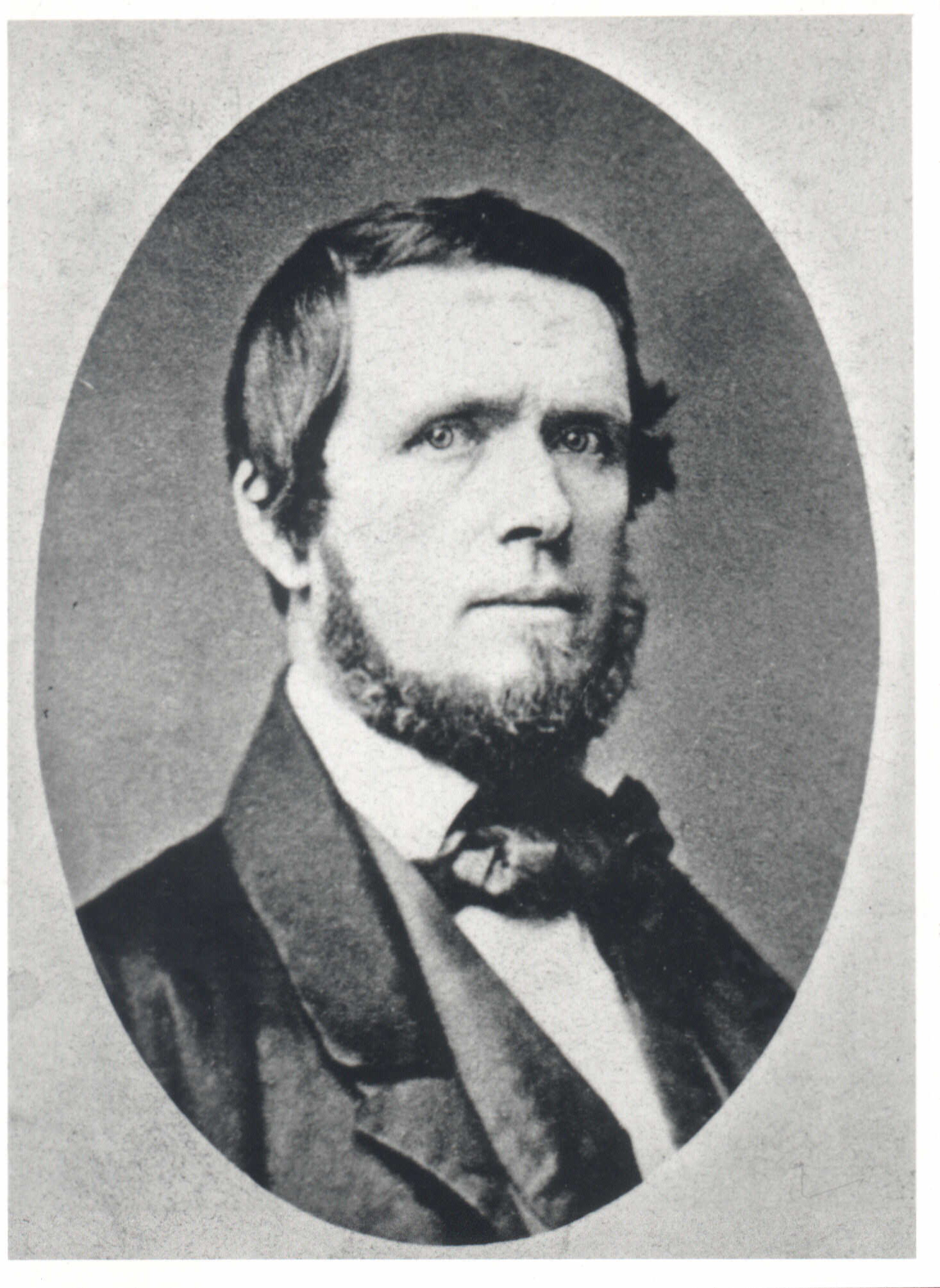
- A photograph of Wilhelm Weitling
- Born: Wilhelm Weitling; October 5, 1808; Magdeburg, Kingdom of Westphalia
- Died: January 25, 1871 (aged 62); New York City, U.S.
- Occupations: Tailor, activist

Wilhelm Christian Weitling (German: [ˈvaɪ̯tlɪŋ]; October 5, 1808 – January 25, 1871) was a German tailor, inventor, radical political activist and one of the first theorists of communism. Weitling gained fame in Europe as a social theorist before he immigrated to the United States.

In addition to his extensive political writing, Weitling was a successful inventor of attachments for commercial sewing machines, including devices for double-stitching and the creation of button holes.

== Biography ==
=== Early years ===
Wilhelm Christian Weitling was born in Magdeburg, Westphalia, the son of Christiane Weitling and Guilliaume Terijon. Weitling's father was a young French officer who was billeted in occupied Prussia, who met and fell in love with Weitling's mother, a household maid. His parents never married, with his father dying in the ill-fated 1812 French invasion of Russia.

Weitling was raised in dire poverty, frequently in the care of others while his mother eked out a meager living as a maid and cook. His formal education was minimal, limited to elementary study in the public school of Magdeburg and such reading as he was able to do on his own at the local library. He was raised as a Roman Catholic through the age of 12, and read the Bible attentively, retaining an ability to quote scripture throughout his life. In keeping with the dual nationality of his birth, Weitling was bilingual in French and German, learning English as well as the basics of Italian later in his life.

Weitling was apprenticed to a tailor at an early age, living with his master and learning the skill of tailoring garments for women and men thoroughly. He became a journeyman at the age of 18, leaving his hometown to travel across the German states in search of employment. He landed in the city of Leipzig in 1830, where he began to take an interest in politics and to try his hand at the writing of satirical poetry. He made his way to Dresden in the fall of 1832 and from there to Vienna in 1834, where he worked fabricating artificial flowers and decorations for women's clothing.

In the fall of 1837 Weitling immigrated to Paris, a city which he had briefly visited two years before. He would remain there for four years, becoming deeply involved in the radical political ideas of the day, in particular the writings of Fourier, Owen and Cabet.

=== Political activity ===
After joining the League of the Just in 1837, Weitling joined Parisian workers in protests and street battles in 1839. Tristram Hunt called his doctrine "a highly emotional mix of Babouvist communism, chiliastic Christianity, and millenarian populism":

In conformity with the work of the Christian radical Felicité de Lamennais, Weitling urged installing communism by physical force with the help of a 40,000-strong army of ex-convicts. A prelapsarian community of goods, fellowship, and societal harmony would then ensue, directed by Weitling himself. While Marx and Engels struggled with the intricacies of industrial capitalism and modern modes of production, Weitling revived the apocalyptic politics of the sixteenth-century Münster Anabaptists and their gory attempts to usher in the Second Coming. Much to Marx and Engels's annoyance, Weitling's giddy blend of evangelism and protocommunism attracted thousands of dedicated disciples across the Continent.

In 1838, he published his first work, Die Menschheit, wie sie ist und wie sie sein sollte (The human race as it is, and as it should be), which was translated into Hungarian and other languages.

In 1841, after the abortive rebellion of the Blanquists, he went to Switzerland, visiting Geneva, Vevey and Langenthal in the canton of Bern, and finally settling in Zürich in 1843. At all these places, he promoted the doctrines of communism with his preaching and publications, including the 1842 work Garantien der Harmonie und Freiheit (Guarantees of harmony and freedom).

Weitling's work Das Evangelium eines armen Sünders (The Poor Sinner's Gospel) came out in 1845, but by this time the attention of the Swiss authorities had been attracted. He was arrested and prosecuted for revolutionary agitation, including blasphemy on account of having published a text which depicted Jesus Christ as both a communist and the illegitimate child of Mary. Found guilty, he was given a six-month sentence.

On his release, he was deported back to Prussia. He resided for a time in Hamburg, but then left on a journey which took him to London, Treves, Brussels and New York City.

In Weitling's 1847 book Gospel of Poor Sinners, he traced communism back to early Christianity.

Upon the outbreak of the revolutions of 1848 in Germany, Weitling returned to Germany, preaching his communism to little effect. When the revolutions failed in 1849, he returned to New York thus becoming one of the Forty-Eighters.

His book Guarantees of Harmony and Freedom was praised by Bruno Bauer, Ludwig Feuerbach and Mikhail Bakunin, the latter of whom Weitling was to meet in Zürich in 1843. Karl Marx, in an article from 1844, referred to Weitling's work as the "vehement and brilliant literary debut of the German workers," Although John Spargo suggested that "what won from Marx this high-sounding praise was simply the fact that Weitling's appeals were addressed to the workers as a class", Marx himself emphasized Weitling's theoretical and philosophical "brilliance," which compared favorably to the more "economically" inclined English workers and the more practical "politically" oriented French workers.

=== American years ===
Weitling continued his activism on behalf of communism in the United States. In January 1850, he began the publication of a monthly journal, Die Republik der Arbeiter. By the end of the year, it had a circulation of 4,000. Toward the end of his life he turned from activism to technological and astronomical studies. For seven years, he was register at Castle Garden. He received nine patents for improvements to sewing machines, among which were double stitch, button hole and embroidery attachments. He received a patent for a dress-trimming crimper which he had worked on for 17 years, and on his death left several unfinished machines.

He participated with the experimental German-American settlement of Communia, Iowa. Weitling died in New York City. A widow and six children survived him.

== Works ==
- Die Menschheit, wie sie ist und wie sie sein sollte (1838/39) German text online
- Guarantees of Harmony and Freedom (Garantien der Harmonie und Freiheit; 1842)
- The Poor Sinner's Gospel (Das Evangelium eines armen Sünders; 1845)
- Ein Nothruf an die Männer der Arbeit und der Sorge, Brief an die Landsleute (1847)

== See also ==
- League of the Just

== Sources ==
- Clark, Frederick Converse (March 1895), "A Neglected Socialist", Annals of the American Academy of Political and Social Science, 5 (5): 66–87, doi:10.1177/000271629500500504, JSTOR 1008890.
- Hunt, Tristram (2010), Marx's General: The Revolutionary Life of Friedrich Engels, Picador, ISBN 9780805092486.
- Jansson, Anton (2018), "'The Pure Teachings of Jesus': On the Christian Language of Wilhelm Weitling's Communism", Praktyka Teoretyczna, 29 (3): 30–48.
- Jansson, Anton (2020), "Building or destroying community: The concept of Sittlichkeit in the political thought of Vormärz Germany", Global Intellectual History, 5 (1): 86–103, doi:10.1080/23801883.2019.1586769. Argues Weitling rejected this Hegelian idea as oppressive and said socialists must work to destroy it.
- Levine, Bruce (1992), The Spirit of 1848: German Immigrants, Labor Conflict, and the Coming of the Civil War, Urbana, IL: University of Illinois Press, ISBN 9780252018732.
- Mühlestein, Hans (Winter 1948), "Marx and the Utopian Wilhelm Weitling", Science & Society, 12 (1): 113–129, doi:10.1177/003682374801200109, JSTOR 40399878.
- Nagel, Daniel (2012), Von republikanischen Deutschen zu deutsch-amerikanischen Republikanern. Ein Beitrag zum Identitätswandel der deutschen Achtundvierziger in den Vereinigten Staaten 1850–1861, St. Ingbert, ISBN 9783861105046.
- Nygaard, Bertel (2022), "Wilhelm Weitling and Early German Socialism", in van der Linden, Marcel (ed.), The Cambridge History of Socialism, vol. 1, Cambridge University Press, pp. 214–231, ISBN 978-1-108-48134-2.
- Seidel-Höppner, Waltraud (1993), Wilhelm Weitling. Leben und Politisches Wirken (PDF), Leipzig, Germany: Rosa-Luxembourg-Verein.
- Seidel-Höppner, Waltraud (2014), Wilhelm Weitling, 1808–1871: Eine politische Biographie, Frankfurt am Main, Germany: Peter Lang, ISBN 9783631646311. In two volumes.
- Wilson, Edmund (2003), "Marx and Engels Take a Hand at Making History", To the Finland Station: A Study in the Writing and Acting of History, New York Review of Books.
- Wittke, Carl (1950), The Utopian Communist: A Biography of Wilhelm Weitling, Nineteenth-Century Reformer, Baton Rouge, LA: Louisiana State University Press.
