= Bermbach (surname) =

Bermbach is a German language surname. Notable people with the name include:

- Adolph Bermbach (1822–1875), German lawyer and revolutionary
- Gregor Bermbach (1981), German bobsledder
