= The Communist Manifesto =

1848 political pamphlet by Karl Marx and Friedrich Engels

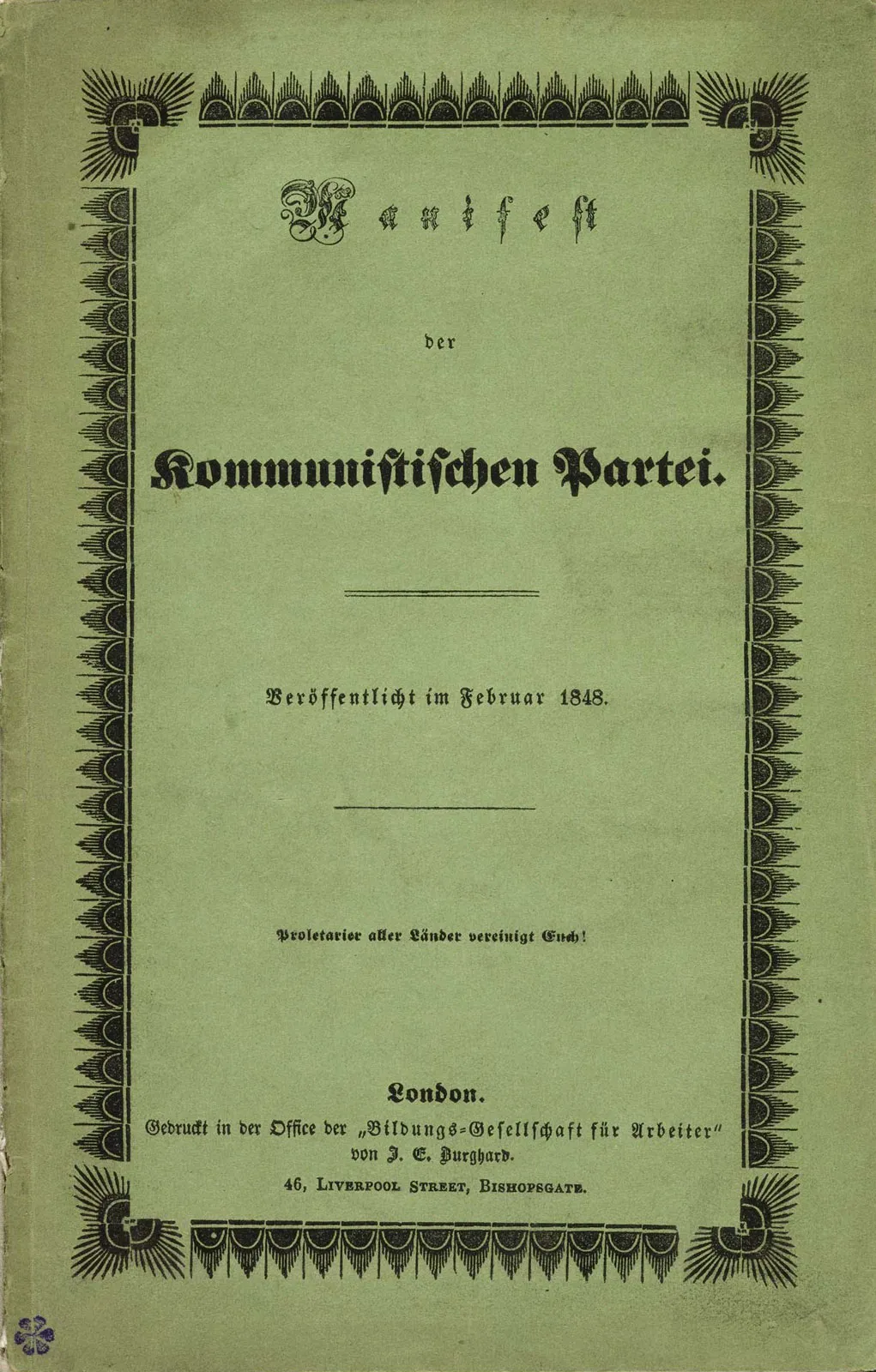
- First edition in German
- Author: Karl Marx; Friedrich Engels
- Language: German
- Genre: Philosophy
- Publication date: 21 February 1848
- Publication place: United Kingdom
- Text: The Communist Manifesto at Wikisource

The Communist Manifesto, (Note: German: Das Kommunistische Manifest) originally the Manifesto of the Communist Party, (Note: German: Manifest der Kommunistischen Partei) is a political pamphlet written by Karl Marx and Friedrich Engels. It was commissioned by the Communist League and published in London in 1848. The text represents the first and most systematic attempt by the two founders of scientific socialism to codify for wide consumption the historical materialist idea; namely, that "the history of all hitherto existing society is the history of class struggles", in which social classes are defined by the relationship of people to the means of production. Published amid the Revolutions of 1848 in Europe, the manifesto has become one of the world's most influential political documents. "A spectre is haunting Europe — the spectre of communism." and "Workers of the world, unite!" stand as two iconic lines that frame the text, marking its opening and its close, respectively, with the latter being reworked and popularized into a famous slogan of working-class solidarity.

In the Manifesto, Marx and Engels combine philosophical materialism with the Hegelian dialectical method in order to analyze the development of European society through its modes of production, including primitive communism, antiquity, feudalism, and capitalism, noting the emergence of a new, dominant class at each stage. The text outlines the relationship between the means of production, relations of production, forces of production, and mode of production, and posits that changes in society's economic "base" affect changes in its "superstructure". The authors assert that capitalism is marked by the exploitation of the proletariat (working class or wage labourers) by the ruling bourgeoisie, which is "constantly revolutionising the instruments [and] relations of production, and with them the whole relations of society". They argue that capital's need for a flexible labour force dissolves the old relations, and that its global expansion in search of new markets creates "a world after its own image".

The Manifesto concludes that capitalism does not offer humanity the possibility of self-realization, instead ensuring that human beings are perpetually stunted and alienated. It theorizes that capitalism will bring about its own destruction by polarizing and unifying the proletariat, and predicts that a revolution will lead to the emergence of communism, a classless society in which "the free development of each is the condition for the free development of all". Marx and Engels proposed ten measures that they said a society transitioning towards Communism should take, measures which in the 1872 preface of the Manifesto they said weren’t applicable to the current situation.

== Synopsis ==
The Communist Manifesto is divided into a preamble and four sections. The preamble begins: "A spectre is haunting Europe—the spectre of communism." Pointing out that it was widespread for politicians—both those in government and those in the opposition—to label their opponents as communists, the authors infer that those in power acknowledge communism to be a power in itself. Subsequently, the preamble exhorts communists to openly publish their views and aims, which is the very function of the Manifesto.

The first section of the document, "Bourgeois and Proletarians", outlines historical materialism, and states that "the history of all hitherto existing society is the history of class struggles". According to the authors, all previous societies had taken the form of an oppressed majority exploited by an oppressive minority. Marx and Engels claim that in their time under capitalism, the industrial working class, or "proletariat", is engaging in class struggle against the owners of the means of production, the "bourgeoisie". The latter, through the "constant revolutionising of production [and] uninterrupted disturbance of all social conditions", had emerged by 1848 as the supreme class in society, displacing the old powers of feudalism. The bourgeoisie continuously exploits the proletariat for its labour power, creating profit for themselves and accumulating capital. In doing so, however, Marx and Engels argue that the bourgeois class is serving as "its own grave-diggers" because, in the view of the authors, proletarians will inevitably become conscious of their own potential and rise to power through revolution, overthrowing the bourgeoisie.

The second section, "Proletarians and Communists", starts by explaining the relationship of "conscious communists" (i.e., those who identify as communists) to the rest of the working class. The communists' party will not oppose other working-class parties, but unlike them, it will express the general will and defend the shared interests of the world's proletariat as a whole, independent of all nationalities. The authors go on to defend communism from various objections, including claims that it advocates communal prostitution or disincentivises people from working. Several pages into Section II, the authors surprisingly switch the narrative voice and address the reader directly: "You are horrified at our intending to do away with private property. But in your existing society, private property is already done away with for nine-tenths of the population; its existence for the few is solely due to its non-existence in the hands of those nine-tenths." The section ends by outlining a set of short-term demands—among them a progressive income tax; abolition of inheritances and private property; abolition of child labour; free public education; nationalisation of the means of transport and communication; centralisation of credit via a national bank; expansion of publicly owned land, etc.—the implementation of which, it is argued, would result in the precursor to a classless society.

The third section, "Socialist and Communist Literature", distinguishes communism from other socialist doctrines prevalent at the time, which are categorised as Reactionary Socialism; Conservative or Bourgeois Socialism; and Critical-Utopian Socialism and Communism. The first category is subdivided into "Feudal Socialism", "Petty-Bourgeois Socialism", and "German or 'True' Socialism". While the degree of reproach varies toward these rival socialist perspectives, all are dismissed by Marx and Engels for advocating reformism and for failing to recognise the pre-eminent revolutionary role of the proletariat. The authors are least hostile toward the utopian socialists whose attacks on existing society "are full of the most valuable materials for the enlightenment of the working class."

The fourth and concluding section, "Position of the Communists in Relation to the Various Opposition Parties", briefly discusses the communist position on struggles in specific countries in the mid-19th century such as in France, Switzerland, Poland, and lastly Germany, which is said to be "on the eve of a bourgeois revolution" that is but "the prelude to an immediately following proletarian revolution" (a prediction later criticized as a fundamental error in the Manifesto). The section ends by declaring an alliance with the democratic socialists, boldly supporting other communist revolutions, and calling for united international proletarian action: "Working Men of All Countries, Unite!"

== Writing ==
=== Preliminary drafts ===
In spring of 1847, Marx and Engels joined the League of the Just, which was soon convinced by the duo's ideas of "critical communism". At its First Congress from 2–9 June, the League tasked Engels with drafting a "Creed" document outlining the League's programme, to be submitted for review at the end of the Congress. Engels quickly produced the "Draft of a Communist Confession of Faith" in question-and-answer format, similar to a catechism, e.g.:

Question 1: Are you a communist?
Answer: Yes.
Question 2: What is the aim of the communists?
To organize society in such a way that each of its members can develop and utilize all his potentialities and powers in full freedom without jeopardizing the foundations of this society.

In total, there were 22 questions, and the answers were relatively terse. In October, Engels arrived at the League's Paris branch to find that Moses Hess had written his own "Creed" document for the League (now called the League of Communists). Engels severely criticised this document (in Hess's absence), and convinced the rest of the League to entrust him with drafting a new one. At the end of October, he wrote the Principles of Communism, again in the style of a catechism but now with 25 questions and more detailed, concrete answers than before.

On 23 November, prior to the League of Communists' Second Congress (29 November – 8 December 1847), Engels sent a letter to Marx, expressing a desire to eschew the catechism format in favour of a manifesto, because he felt it must contain "a certain amount of history." On 28 November, Marx and Engels met at Ostend in Belgium, and a few days later, gathered at the Soho, London headquarters of the German Workers' Education Association to attend the Congress. Over the next ten days, intense debate raged between League functionaries; Marx eventually dominated the others and, overcoming "stiff and prolonged opposition", in Harold Laski's words, secured a majority for his programme. The League thus unanimously adopted a far more combative resolution than at the First Congress in June. Marx (especially) and Engels were commissioned to draw up a manifesto for the League.

=== Manuscript ===
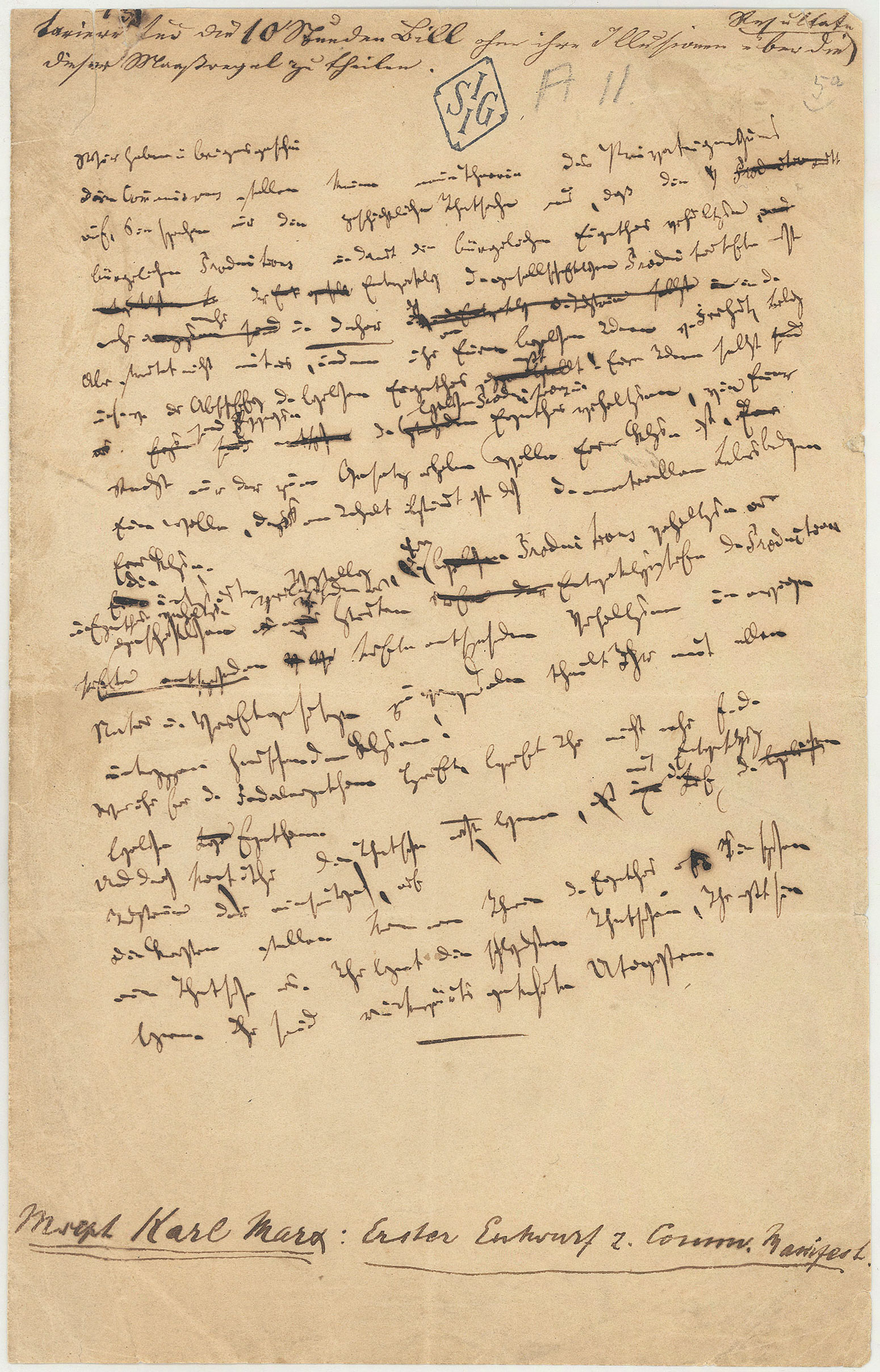
Only surviving page from the first draft of the Manifesto, handwritten by Karl Marx

Upon returning to Brussels, Marx engaged in "ceaseless procrastination", according to his biographer Francis Wheen. Working only intermittently on the Manifesto, Marx spent much of his time delivering lectures on political economy at the German Workers' Education Association, writing articles for the Deutsche-Brüsseler-Zeitung, and giving a long speech on free trade. Following this, he even spent a week (17–26 January 1848) in Ghent to establish a branch of the Democratic Association. Having not heard from Marx for nearly two months, the Central Committee of the Communist League sent him an ultimatum on 24 or 26 January, demanding he submit the completed manuscript by 1 February. This imposition spurred Marx on, who struggled to work without the pressure of a deadline, and he seems to have rushed to finish the job in time. As evidence of the haste, historian Eric Hobsbawm points to the absence of any extant preliminary drafts; only one Manifesto draft page has ever been located.

=== Final version ===
In all, the Manifesto was written over a span of 6–7 weeks. Although Engels is credited as co-author, the final version was penned exclusively by Marx. Laski infers from the January ultimatum letter that the Communist League considered Marx to be the principal draftsman and that Engels was merely their agent, imminently replaceable. Engels himself wrote in a preface to the 1883 German edition: "The basic thought running through the Manifesto [...] belongs solely and exclusively to Marx". While Laski does not disagree, he suggests that Engels underplays his own contribution with characteristic modesty, and notes the "close resemblance between its substance and that of the [Principles of Communism]". Moreover, Laski says that while writing the Manifesto, Marx was borrowing from the "joint stock of ideas" he developed with Engels, "a kind of intellectual bank account upon which either could draw freely". Anthony Arnove also believes that "the kernel of the Manifesto" can be found in the Principles of Communism, and that Marx's real task "was to translate this catechism into the form of a manifesto, with more historical narrative and greater rhetorical force."

=== Influences ===
Marx and Engels' political influences were wide-ranging, reacting to and taking inspiration from German idealist philosophy, French socialism, and English and Scottish political economy. Scholars have argued that The Communist Manifesto owes a debt to literary authors. Christopher N. Warren makes the case that the writings of John Milton influenced Marx and Engels: "Looking back on Milton's era, Marx saw a historical dialectic founded on inspiration in which freedom of the press, republicanism, and revolution were closely joined". In Specters of Marx, Jacques Derrida connects the ghost haunting Hamlet in William Shakespeare's play to the metaphor of communism haunting Europe, and Derrida cites the Act I line from Hamlet, "Time is out of joint", as indicative of the instability and injustice in Europe that the Manifesto was depicting. Historians of 19th-century reading habits have confirmed that Marx and Engels read these authors, and it is known that Marx loved Shakespeare in particular.

The Manifesto also references the "revolutionary" antibourgeois social criticism of Thomas Carlyle, whom Engels had read as early as May 1843.

== Publication ==
=== Initial publication and obscurity, 1848–1872 ===
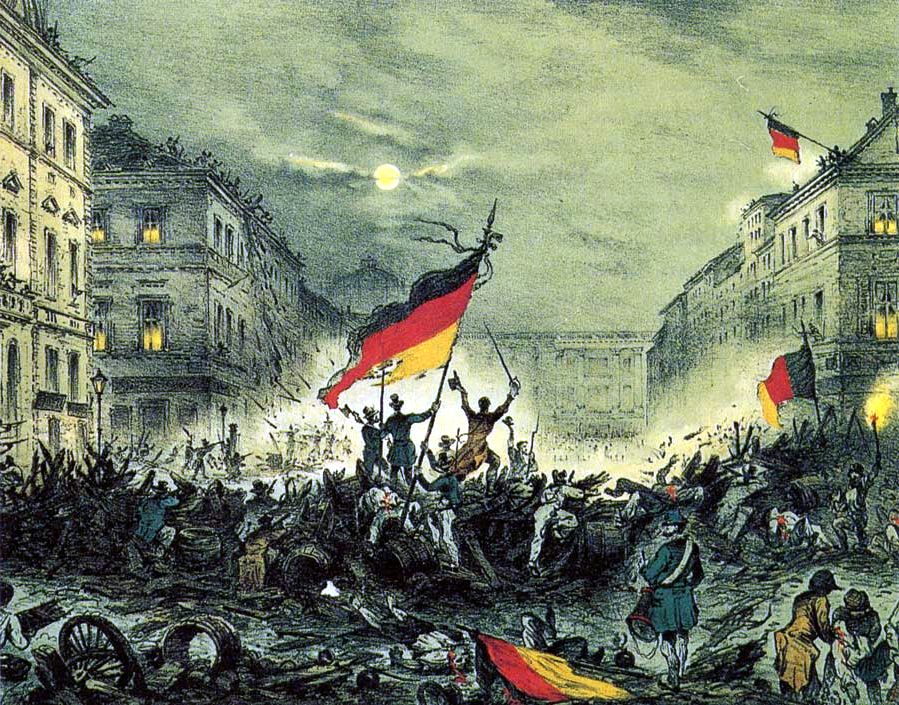
A scene from the German March 1848 Revolution in Berlin

In late February 1848, the Manifesto was anonymously published by the Communist Workers' Educational Association (Kommunistischer Arbeiterbildungsverein), based at 46 Liverpool Street, in the Bishopsgate Without area of the City of London. Written in German, the 23-page pamphlet was titled Manifest der kommunistischen Partei and had a dark-green cover. It was reprinted three times and serialised in the Deutsche Londoner Zeitung, a newspaper for German émigrés. On 4 March, one day after the serialisation in the Zeitung began, Marx was expelled by Belgian police. Two weeks later, around 20 March, a thousand copies of the Manifesto reached Paris, and from there to Germany in early April. In April–May the text was corrected for printing and punctuation mistakes; Marx and Engels would use this 30-page version as the basis for future editions of the Manifesto.

Although the Manifesto's preamble announced that it was "to be published in the English, French, German, Italian, Flemish and Danish languages", the initial printings were only in German. Polish and Danish translations soon followed the German original in London, and by the end of 1848, a Swedish translation was published with a new title—The Voice of Communism: Declaration of the Communist Party. In November 1850, the Manifesto of the Communist Party had its first English publication when George Julian Harney serialised Helen Macfarlane's translation in his Chartist newspaper The Red Republican. Her version begins: "A frightful hobgoblin stalks throughout Europe. We are haunted by a ghost, the ghost of Communism". For her translation, the Lancashire-based Macfarlane probably consulted Engels, who had abandoned his own English translation half way. Harney's introduction revealed the Manifesto's hitherto-anonymous authors' identities for the first time.

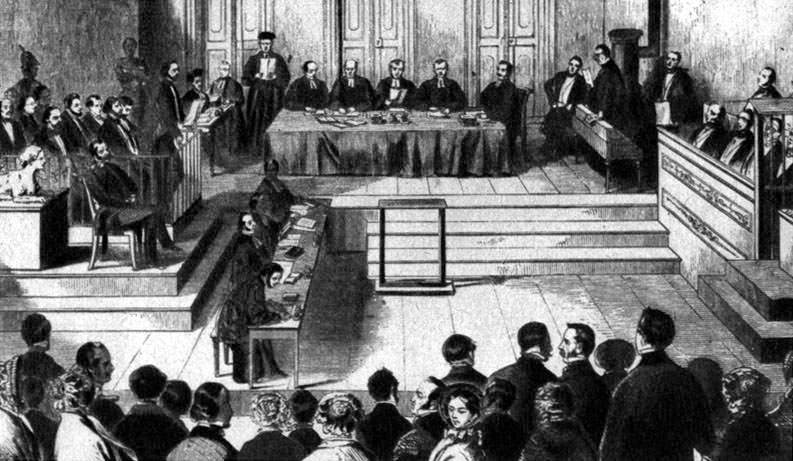
Immediately after the Cologne Communist Trial of late 1852, the Communist League disbanded itself.

A French translation of the Manifesto was published just before the June Days Uprising was crushed. Its influence in the Europe-wide Revolutions of 1848 was restricted to Germany, where the Cologne-based Communist League and its newspaper Neue Rheinische Zeitung, edited by Marx, played an important role. Within a year of its establishment, in May 1849, the Zeitung was suppressed; Marx was expelled from Germany and had to seek refuge in London. In 1851, members of the Communist League's central board were arrested by the Prussian Secret Police. At their trial in Cologne 18 months later in November 1852, they were sentenced to 3–6 years' imprisonment. For Engels, the revolution was "forced into the background by the reaction that began with the defeat of the Paris workers in June 1848, and was finally excommunicated 'by law' in the conviction of the Cologne Communists in November 1852".

After the defeat of the 1848 revolutions, the Manifesto fell into obscurity, where it remained throughout the 1850s and 1860s. Hobsbawm says that by November 1850 the Manifesto "had become sufficiently scarce for Marx to think it worth reprinting section III [...] in the last issue" of his short-lived London newspaper, Neue Rheinische Zeitung. Over the next two decades only a few new editions were published; these included an (unauthorised and occasionally inaccurate) 1869 Russian translation by Mikhail Bakunin in Geneva, and an 1866 edition in Berlin—the first time the Manifesto was published in Germany. According to Hobsbawm, "By the middle 1860s virtually nothing that Marx had written in the past was any longer in print". However, John Cowell-Stepney did print an abridged version in the Social Economist in August/September 1869, in time for the Basle Congress.

=== Rise, 1872–1917 ===
In the early 1870s, the Manifesto and its authors experienced a revival in fortunes. Hobsbawm identifies three reasons for this. The first is the leadership role Marx played in the International Workingmen's Association (aka the First International). Second, Marx came into great prominence among socialists—and equal notoriety among the authorities—for his support of the Paris Commune of 1871, elucidated in The Civil War in France. Third, and perhaps most significantly was the treason trial of the Social Democratic Workers' Party of Germany (SDAP) leaders. During the proceedings, prosecutors read the text of the Manifesto into the court record; this meant that the pamphlet could legally be published in Germany. Thus in 1872 Marx and Engels rushed out a new German-language edition. In the preface, they acknowledged that while some of the document's details had become dated in the intervening quarter century, specifically the measures proposed in the second section, that "the general principles laid down in the Manifesto are, on the whole, as correct today as ever." This edition was the first time the title was shortened to The Communist Manifesto (Das Kommunistische Manifest), and it became the version the authors based future editions upon. Between 1871 and 1873, the Manifesto was published in over nine editions in six languages. On 30 December 1871, Woodhull & Claflin's Weekly published it in the U.S. for the first time; it was printed in English using the Helen Macfarlane translation. By the mid-1870s, however, the Communist Manifesto remained Marx and Engels' only work to be even moderately well-known.

Over the next forty years, as social-democratic parties rose across Europe and parts of the world, so did the publication of the Manifesto alongside them, in hundreds of editions in thirty languages. Marx and Engels wrote a new preface for the 1882 Russian edition, translated by Georgi Plekhanov in Geneva. In it they wondered if Russia could directly become a communist society, or if she would become capitalist first like other European countries. After Marx's death in March 1883, Engels provided the prefaces for five editions between 1888 and 1893. Among these is the 1888 English edition, translated by Samuel Moore and approved by Engels, who also provided notes throughout the text. It has become the standard English-language edition ever since.

The Manifesto's principal sphere of influence, as measured by the locations where editions were published, was in the "central belt of Europe", from Russia in the east to France in the west. In comparison, the pamphlet had little impact on politics in southwest and southeast Europe, and moderate presence in the north. Outside Europe, Chinese and Japanese translations were published, as were Spanish editions in Latin America. The first Chinese edition of the book was translated by Zhu Zhixin after the 1905 Russian Revolution in a Tongmenghui newspaper along with articles on socialist movements in Europe, North America, and Japan.

This uneven spread in the Manifesto's popularity reflected the uneven development of socialist movements, and of the adoption of Marxist socialism, in various geographical regions. Also, there was not always a strong correlation between a social-democratic party's strength in a country and the Manifesto's popularity there. For instance, the German SPD printed only a few thousand copies of the Manifesto every year, but a few hundred thousand copies of the Erfurt Programme. The mass-based social-democratic parties of the Second International did not require their rank-and-file to be well-versed in theory; Marxist works such as the Manifesto or Das Kapital were read primarily by party theoreticians. On the other hand, small, dedicated militant parties and Marxist sects in the West took pride in knowing the Manifesto by heart. Hobsbawm writes, "This was the milieu in which 'the clearness of a comrade could be gauged invariably from the number of earmarks on his Manifesto'."

=== Ubiquity, 1917–present ===
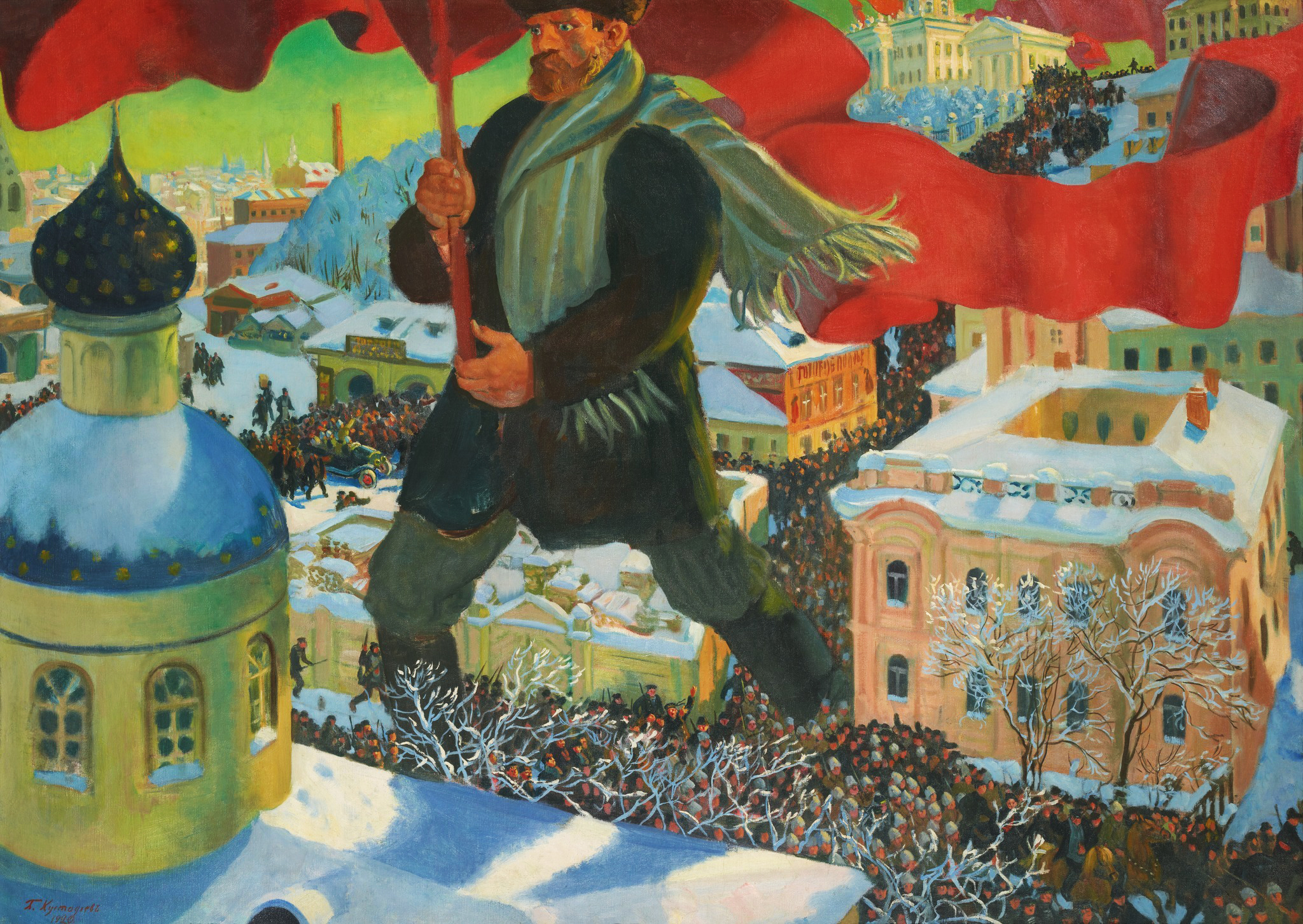
Following the 1917 October Revolution, Marx and Engels' classics like The Communist Manifesto were distributed far and wide.

Following the October Revolution of 1917 that swept the Vladimir Lenin-led Bolsheviks to power in Russia, the world's first socialist state was founded explicitly along Marxist lines. The Soviet Union, which Bolshevik Russia would become a part of, was a one-party state under the rule of the Communist Party of the Soviet Union (CPSU). Unlike their mass-based counterparts of the Second International, the CPSU and other Leninist parties like it in the Third International expected their members to know the classic works of Marx, Engels and Lenin. Further, party leaders were expected to base their policy decisions on Marxist–Leninist ideology. Therefore, the Manifesto was required reading.

Widespread dissemination of Marx and Engels' works became an important policy objective. Backed by a sovereign state, the CPSU had relatively inexhaustible resources for this purpose. Works by Marx, Engels, and Lenin were published on a very large scale, and cheap editions of their works were available in several languages across the world. These publications were either specific writings, or they were compendia such as the various editions of Marx and Engels' Selected Works, or their Collected Works. This affected the destiny of the Manifesto in several ways. Firstly, in terms of circulation; in 1932 the American and British Communist Parties printed several hundred thousand copies of a cheap edition for "probably the largest mass edition ever issued in English". Secondly, the Manifesto entered political-science syllabi in universities. For its centenary in 1948, the Manifesto had moved beyond the exclusive domain of Marxists and academicians; general publishers also printed it in large numbers. "In short, it was no longer only a classic Marxist document", Hobsbawm noted, "it had become a political classic tout court."

In 1920, the Communist Manifesto was printed and distributed in Chinese, with its publishing being a major priority of the Shanghai Communist Group. Communist International representative in Shanghai Grigori Voitinsky funded the translation and dissemination of the manifesto. Chen Wangdao is credited as translator of the first printing. It quickly became a popular text among Chinese intellectuals. It was dubbed "the first red book of China."

Even after the collapse of the Soviet Bloc in the 1990s, the Communist Manifesto has remained ubiquitous; Hobsbawm says that "In states without censorship, almost certainly anyone within reach of a good bookshop, and certainly anyone within reach of a good library, not to mention the internet, can have access to it". The 150th anniversary once again brought a deluge of attention in the press and the academia, as well as new editions fronted by introductions to the text by academics. One of these, The Communist Manifesto: A Modern Edition by Verso, was touted by a critic in the London Review of Books as being a "stylish red-ribboned edition of the work. It is designed as a sweet keepsake, an exquisite collector's item. In Manhattan, a prominent Fifth Avenue store put copies of this choice new edition in the hands of shop-window mannequins, displayed in come-hither poses and fashionable décolletage". Total sales of the Manifesto have been estimated at 500 million, and it is one of the four best-selling books of all time.

== Legacy ==
"With the clarity and brilliance of genius, this work outlines a new world-conception, consistent materialism, which also embraces the realm of social life; dialectics, as the most comprehensive and profound doctrine of development; the theory of the class struggle and of the world-historic revolutionary role of the proletariat—the creator of a new, communist society."

— Vladimir Lenin on the Manifesto, 1914

A number of late-20th- and 21st-century writers have commented on the Communist Manifesto's continuing relevance. In a special issue of the Socialist Register commemorating the Manifesto's 150th anniversary, Peter Osborne argued that it was "the single most influential text written in the nineteenth century". Academic John Raines in 2002 noted: "In our day this Capitalist Revolution has reached the farthest corners of the earth. The tool of money has produced the miracle of the new global market and the ubiquitous shopping mall. Read The Communist Manifesto, written more than one hundred and fifty years ago, and you will discover that Marx foresaw it all". In 2003, English Marxist Chris Harman stated: "There is still a compulsive quality to its prose as it provides insight after insight into the society in which we live, where it comes from and where it's going to. It is still able to explain, as mainstream economists and sociologists cannot, today's world of recurrent wars and repeated economic crisis, of hunger for hundreds of millions on the one hand and 'overproduction' on the other. There are passages that could have come from the most recent writings on globalisation". Alex Callinicos, editor of International Socialism, stated in 2010: "This is indeed a manifesto for the 21st century". Writing in The London Evening Standard, Andrew Neather cited Verso Books' 2012 re-edition of the Manifesto with an introduction by Eric Hobsbawm as part of a resurgence of left-wing-themed ideas that included the publication of Owen Jones' book Chavs: The Demonization of the Working Class and Jason Barker's documentary Marx Reloaded.

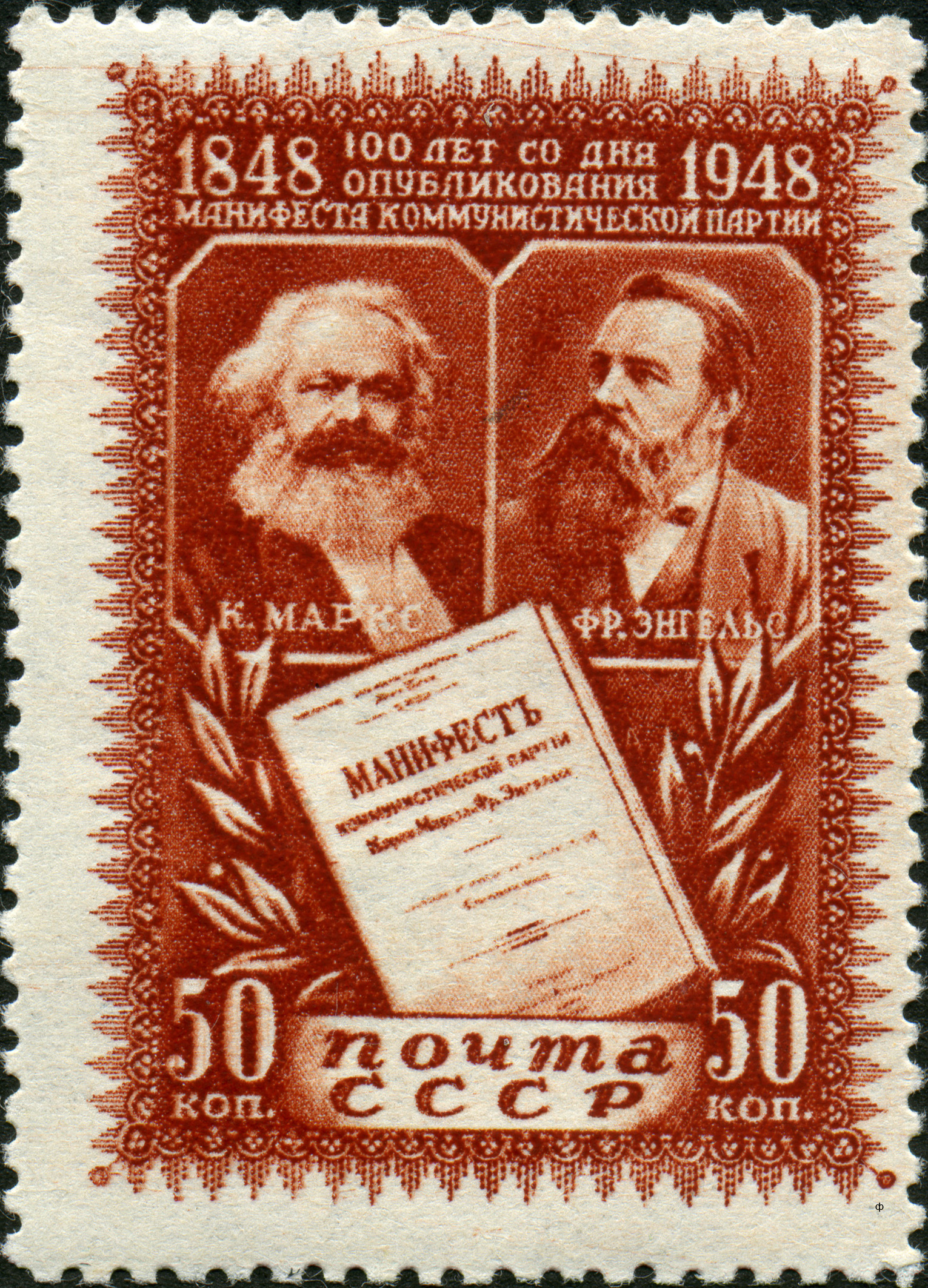
Soviet Union stamp commemorating the 100th anniversary of the Manifesto

In contrast, critics such as revisionist Marxist and reformist socialist Eduard Bernstein distinguished between "immature" early Marxism—as exemplified by The Communist Manifesto written by Marx and Engels in their youth—that he opposed for its violent Blanquist tendencies and later "mature" Marxism that he supported. This latter form refers to Marx in his later life seemingly claiming that socialism, under certain circumstances, could be achieved through peaceful means via legislative reform in capitalist societies with parliamentary systems.

Bernstein declared that the massive and homogeneous working-class posited in the Communist Manifesto did not exist, and that contrary to predictions of a proletarian majority emerging, the middle-class was growing under capitalism and not disappearing as Marx had forecast. Marx himself later acknowledged that the Petite bourgeoisie was not disappearing, for example, in his 1863 work, Theories of Surplus Value. The obscurity of his later work means that Marx's acknowledgement of his error was not well known. George Boyer described the Manifesto as "very much a period piece, a document of what was called the 'hungry' 1840s". Hal Draper rejected Bernstein's arguments about the middle class, stating that the Manifesto actually notes that, although individual members of this class are being constantly proletarianized, the class 'limps on, in a more and more ruined state'.

Foremost among the Manifesto's criticized predictions is that world revolution is imminent. Seymour Lipset wrote in 1981 that "Marx's fundamental premise has been totally refuted by history", i.e., that class conflicts in highly industrialized countries would soon result in workers overturning capitalism. After asserting in a book review that the Manifesto has enduring relevance, Cory Doctorow added: "This despite its most glaring defect, because, of course, the Manifesto's chief prediction – the imminent downfall of capitalism – was dead wrong."

Another relevant contemporary objection points out that four different – in certain regards divergent – concepts of "change" ("Veränderung") feature in the Manifesto, viz., (a) rupture, (b) development according to historical laws, (c) continuation, and (d) reform; on close analysis, Andreas Dorschel has argued, they turn out to be in part, either logically or as a matter of fact, incompatible.

Others have drawn attention to the passage in the Manifesto that seems to sneer at the stupidity of the rustic: "The bourgeoisie [...] draws all nations [...] into civilisation[.] [...] It has created enormous cities [...] and thus rescued a considerable part of the population from the idiocy [sic] of rural life". However, as Eric Hobsbawm noted:

[W]hile there is no doubt that Marx at this time shared the usual townsman's contempt for, as well as ignorance of, the peasant milieu, the actual and analytically more interesting German phrase ("dem Idiotismus des Landlebens entrissen") referred not to "stupidity" but to "the narrow horizons", or "the isolation from the wider society" in which people in the countryside lived. It echoed the original meaning of the Greek term idiotes from which the current meaning of "idiot" or "idiocy" is derived, namely "a person concerned only with his own private affairs and not with those of the wider community". In the course of the decades since the 1840s, and in movements whose members, unlike Marx, were not classically educated, the original sense was lost and was misread.

In 2013, a manuscript page of The Communist Manifesto was added to UNESCO's Memory of the World International Register along with Marx's annotated copy of Capital, Volume I. These are held among more of Marx's papers at the International Institute of Social History in Amsterdam.

== Editions ==
- Marx, Karl; Engels, Friedrich (1977) [1848]. Manifesto of the Communist Party (2nd revised ed.). Moscow: Progress.
- Marx, Karl; Engels, Friedrich (2004) [1848]. Manifesto of the Communist Party (PDF). Marxists Internet Archive.
