= Influences on Karl Marx =

Impacts on German socialist philosopher

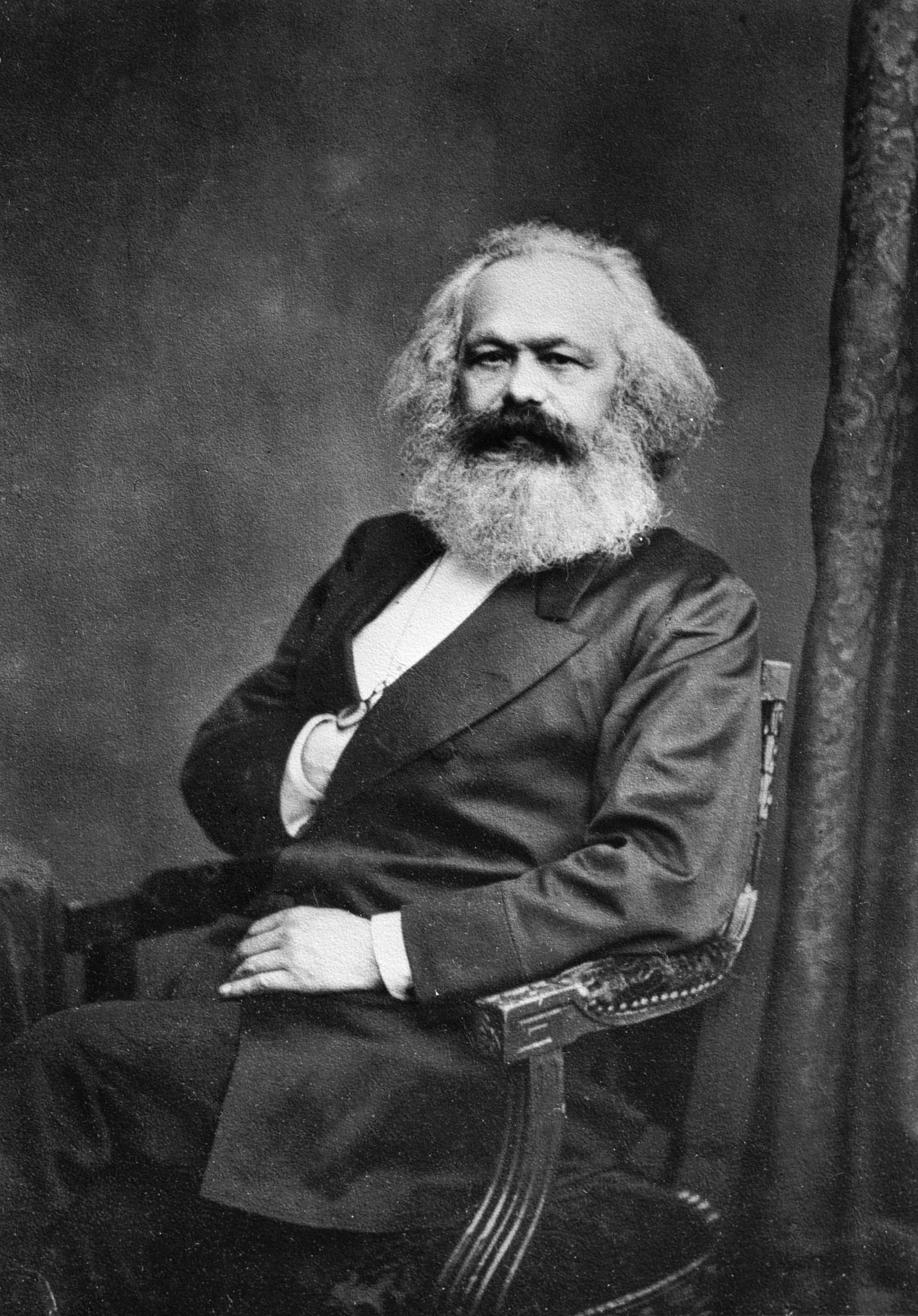
Karl Marx in 1875

Influences on Karl Marx are generally thought to have been derived from three main sources, namely German idealist philosophy, French socialism and English and Scottish political economy.

== German philosophy ==
=== Immanuel Kant ===
Immanuel Kant is believed to have had a greater influence than any other philosopher of modern times. Kantian philosophy was the basis on which the structure of Marxism was built—particularly as it was developed by Georg Wilhelm Friedrich Hegel. Hegel's dialectical method, which was taken up by Karl Marx, was an extension of the method of reasoning by antinomies that Kant used.

Philip J. Kain believes Kant was especially influential on Young Marx's ethical views.

=== Georg Wilhelm Friedrich Hegel ===
By the time of his death, Hegel was the most prominent philosopher in Germany. His views were widely taught and his students were highly regarded. His followers soon divided into right-wing and left-wing Hegelians. Theologically and politically, the right-wing Hegelians offered a conservative interpretation of his work. They emphasized the compatibility between Hegel's philosophy and Christianity; they were orthodox. The left-wing Hegelians eventually moved to an atheistic position. In politics, many of them became revolutionaries. This historically important left-wing group included Ludwig Feuerbach, Bruno Bauer, Friedrich Engels and Marx himself. They were often referred to as the Young Hegelians.

While Marx accepted this broad conception of history, Hegel was an idealist and Marx sought to rewrite dialectics in materialist terms. He summarized the materialistic aspect of his theory of history in the 1859 preface to A Contribution to the Critique of Political Economy:

In the social production of their existence, men inevitably enter into definite relations, which are independent of their will, namely relations of production appropriate to a given stage in the development of their material forces of production. The totality of these relations of production constitutes the economic structure of society, the real foundation, on which arises a legal and political superstructure and to which correspond definite forms of social consciousness. The mode of production of material life conditions the general process of social, political and intellectual life. It is not the consciousness of men that determines their existence, but their social existence that determines their consciousness.

In this brief popularization of his ideas, Marx emphasized that social development sprang from the inherent contradictions within material life and the social superstructure. This notion is often understood as a simple historical narrative: primitive communism had developed into slave states. Slave states had developed into feudal societies. Those societies in turn became capitalist states and those states would be overthrown by the self-conscious portion of their working class, or proletariat, creating the conditions for socialism and ultimately a higher form of communism than that with which the whole process began. Marx illustrated his ideas most prominently by the development of capitalism from feudalism and by the prediction of the development of communism from capitalism.

=== Ludwig Feuerbach ===
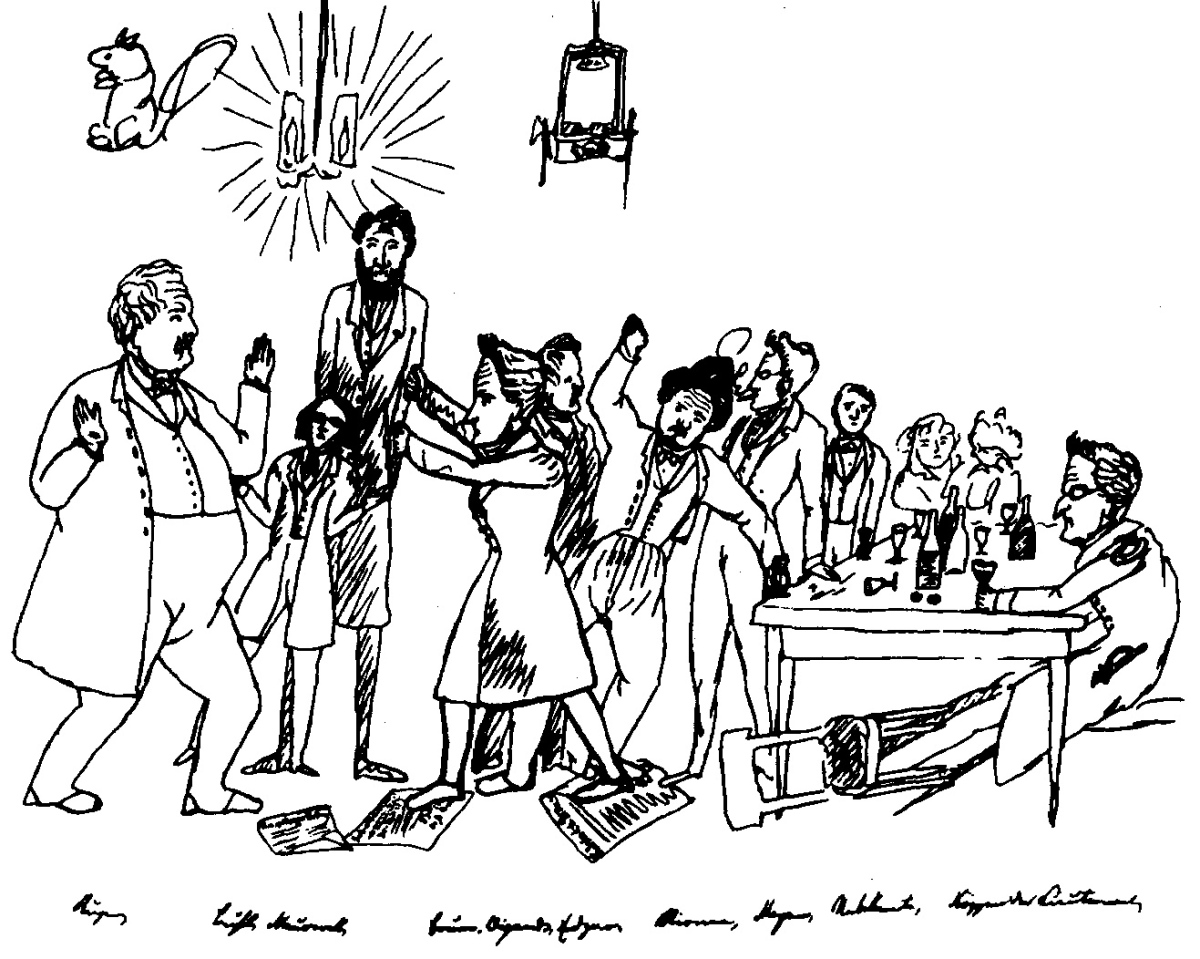
Die Freien by Friedrich Engels, a group of Young Hegelians formed at the University of Berlin. Attendees included Max Stirner, Bruno Bauer, Arnold Ruge, Friedrich Engels and Karl Marx.

Ludwig Feuerbach was a German philosopher and anthropologist. Feuerbach proposed that people should interpret social and political thought as their foundation and their material needs. He held that an individual is the product of their environment and that the whole consciousness of a person is the result of the interaction of sensory organs and the external world. Marx and Engels saw in Feuerbach's emphasis on people and human needs a movement toward a materialistic interpretation of society. In The Essence of Christianity (1841), Feuerbach argued that God is really a creation of man and that the qualities people attribute to God are really qualities of humanity. Accordingly, Marx argued that it is the material world that is real and that our ideas of it are consequences, not causes, of the world. Thus, like Hegel and other philosophers, Marx distinguished between appearances and reality. However, he did not believe that the material world hides from us the real world of the ideal; on the contrary, he thought that historically and socially specific ideology prevented people from seeing the material conditions of their lives clearly.

What distinguished Marx from Feuerbach was his view of Feuerbach's humanism as excessively abstract and so no less ahistorical and idealist than what it purported to replace, namely the reified notion of God found in institutional Christianity that legitimized the repressive power of the Prussian state. Instead, Marx aspired to give ontological priority to what he called the real life process of real human beings as he and Engels said in The German Ideology (1846):

In direct contrast to German philosophy, which descends from heaven to earth, here we ascend from earth to heaven. That is to say, we do not set out from what men say, imagine, conceive, nor from men as narrated, thought of, imagined, conceived, in order to arrive at men in the flesh. We set out from real, active men, and on the basis of their real life process we demonstrate the development of the ideological reflexes and echoes of this life process. The phantoms formed in the human brain are also, necessarily, sublimates of their material life process, which is empirically verifiable and bound to material premises. Morality, religion, metaphysics, all the rest of ideology and their corresponding forms of consciousness, thus no longer retain the semblance of independence. They have no history, no development; but men, developing their material production and their material intercourse, alter, along with this, their real existence, their thinking, and the products of their thinking. Life is not determined by consciousness, but consciousness by life.

In his "Theses on Feuerbach" (1844), he also writes that "the philosophers have only interpreted the world, in various ways, the point is to change it". This opposition between firstly various subjective interpretations given by philosophers, which may be in a sense compared with Weltanschauung designed to legitimize the current state of affairs; and secondly, the effective transformation of the world through praxis, which combines theory and practice in a materialist way, is what distinguishes Marxist philosophers from the rest of philosophers. Indeed, Marx's break with German idealism involves a new definition of philosophy as Louis Althusser, founder of structural Marxism in the 1960s, would define it as class struggle in theory. Marx's movement away from university philosophy and towards the workers' movement is thus inextricably linked to his rupture with his earlier writings, which pushed Marxist commentators to speak of a young Marx and a mature Marx, although the nature of this cut poses problems. A year before the Revolutions of 1848, Marx and Engels thus wrote The Communist Manifesto, which was prepared to an imminent revolution and ended with the famous cry: "Proletarians of all countries, unite!". However, Marx's thought changed again following Louis-Napoleon Bonaparte's 2 December 1851 coup, which put an end to the French Second Republic and created the Second Empire which would last until the 1870 Franco-Prussian War. Marx thereby modified his theory of alienation exposed in the Economic and Philosophical Manuscripts of 1844 and would later arrive to his theory of commodity fetishism, exposed in the first chapter of the first book of Das Kapital (1867). This abandonment of the early theory of alienation would be amply discussed, several Marxist theorists, including Marxist humanists such as the Praxis School, would return to it. Others such as Althusser would claim that the epistemological break between the young Marx and the mature Marx was such that no comparisons could be done between both works, marking a shift to a scientific theory of society.

=== Rupture with German idealism and the Young Hegelians ===
Marx did not study directly with Hegel, but after Hegel's death he studied under one of Hegel's pupils, Bruno Bauer, a leader of the circle of Young Hegelians to whom Marx attached himself. However, Marx and Engels came to disagree with Bauer and the rest of the Young Hegelians about socialism and also about the usage of Hegel's dialectic. From 1841, the young Marx progressively broke away from German idealism and the Young Hegelians. Along with Engels, who observed the Chartist movement in the United Kingdom, he cut away with the environment in which he grew up and encountered the proletariat in France and Germany.

He then wrote a scathing criticism of the Young Hegelians in two books, The Holy Family (1845) and The German Ideology in which he criticized not only Bauer, but also Max Stirner's The Ego and Its Own (1844), considered as one of the founding book of individualist anarchism. Stirner claimed that all ideals were inherently alienating and that replacing God by the humanity—as did Ludwig Feuerbach in The Essence of Christianity—was not sufficient. According to Stirner, any ideals, God, humanity, the nation, or even the revolution alienated the Ego. In The Poverty of Philosophy (1845), Marx also criticized Pierre-Joseph Proudhon, who had become famous with his cry "Property is theft!".

Marx's early writings are thus a response towards Hegel, German idealism and a break with the rest of the Young Hegelians. Marx stood Hegel on his head in his own view of his role by turning the idealistic dialectic into a materialistic one in proposing that material circumstances shape ideas instead of the other way around. In this, Marx was following the lead of Feuerbach. His theory of alienation, developed in the Economic and Philosophical Manuscripts of 1844 (published in 1932), inspired itself from Feuerbach's critique of the alienation of man in God through the objectivation of all his inherent characteristics (thus man projected on God all qualities which are in fact man's own quality which defines human nature). Marx also criticized Feuerbach for being insufficiently materialistic—as Stirner himself had point out—and explained that the alienation described by the Young Hegelians was in fact the result of the structure of the economy itself. Furthermore, he criticized Feuerbach's conception of human nature in his sixth thesis on Feuerbach as an abstract "kind" which incarnated itself in each singular individual: "Feuerbach resolves the essence of religion into the essence of man [menschliche Wesen, human nature]. But the essence of man is no abstraction inherent in each single individual. In reality, it is the ensemble of the social relations". Thereupon, instead of founding itself on the singular, concrete individual subject as did classic philosophy, including contractualism (Thomas Hobbes, John Locke and Jean-Jacques Rousseau), but also political economy, Marx began with the totality of social relations: labour, language and all which constitute our human existence. He claimed that individualism was an essence the result of commodity fetishism or alienation. Although some critics have claimed that meant that Marx enforced a strict social determinism which destroyed the possibility of free will, Marx's philosophy in no way can be reduced to such determinism as his own personal trajectory makes clear.

In 1844–1845, when Marx was starting to settle his account with Hegel and the Young Hegelians in his writings, he critiqued the Young Hegelians for limiting the horizon of their critique to religion and not taking up the critique of the state and civil society as paramount. Indeed, by the look of Marx's writings in that period (most famous of which is the Economic and Philosophical Manuscripts of 1844, a text that most explicitly elaborated his theory of alienation), Marx's thinking could have taken at least three possible courses, namely the study of law, religion and the state, the study of natural philosophy and the study of political economy. He chose the last as the predominant focus of his studies for the rest of his life, largely on account of his previous experience as the editor of the newspaper Rheinische Zeitung on whose pages he fought for freedom of expression against Prussian censorship and made a rather idealist, legal defense for the Moselle peasants' customary right of collecting wood in the forest (this right was at the point of being criminalized and privatized by the state). It was Marx's inability to penetrate beneath the legal and polemical surface of the latter issue to its materialist, economic and social roots that prompted him to critically study political economy.

== English and Scottish political economy ==
Political economy predates the 20th century division of the two disciplines of politics and economics, treating social relations and economic relations as interwoven. Marx built on and critiqued the most well-known political economists of his day, the British classical political economists.

=== Adam Smith and David Ricardo ===
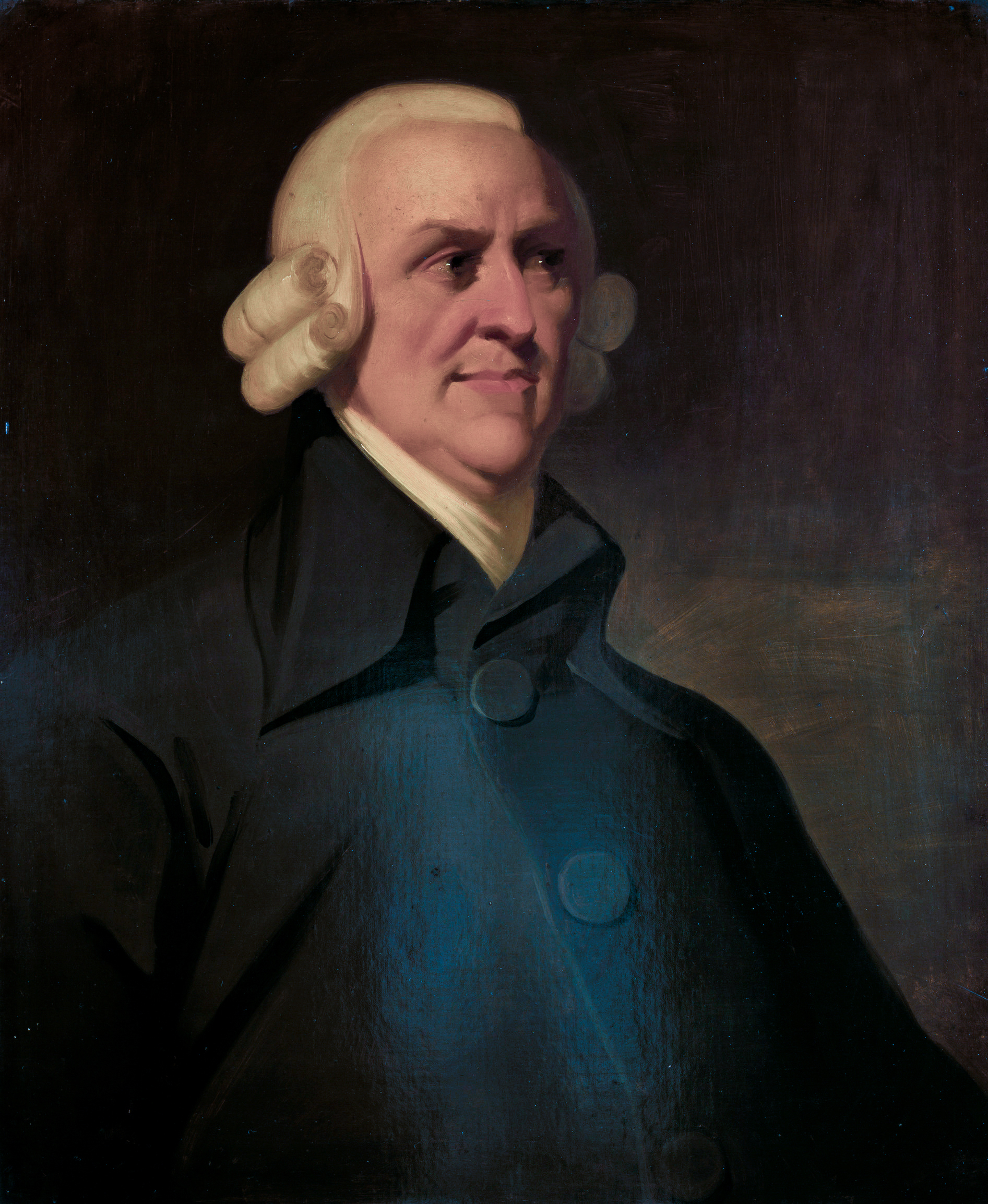
Adam Smith

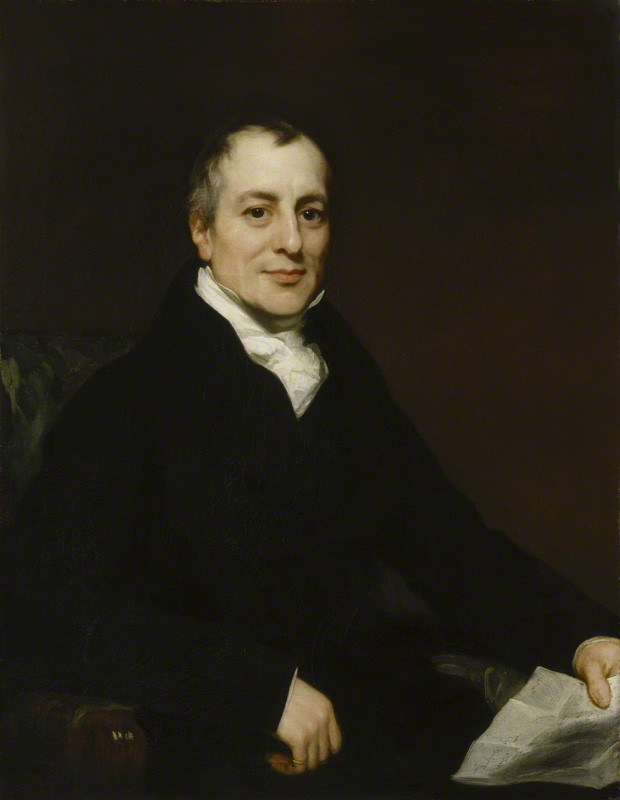
David Ricardo

From Adam Smith came the idea that the grounds of property is labour. Marx critiqued Smith and David Ricardo for not realizing that their economic concepts reflected specifically capitalist institutions, not innate natural properties of human society; and therefore could not be applied unchanged to all societies. He proposed a systematic correlation between labour-values and money prices. He claimed that the source of profits under capitalism is value added by workers not paid out in wages. This mechanism operated through the distinction between labour power, which workers freely exchanged for their wages; and labour, over which asset-holding capitalists thereby gained control.

This practical and theoretical distinction was Marx's primary insight and allowed him to develop the concept of surplus value, which distinguished his works from that of Smith and Ricardo. Workers create enough value during a short period of the working day to pay their wages for that day (necessary labour), yet they continue to work for several more hours and continue to create value (surplus labour). This value is not returned to them, but appropriated by the capitalists (the bourgeoisie). Thus, it is not the capitalist ruling class that creates wealth, but the workers—the capitalists then appropriating this wealth to themselves. Some of Marx's insights were seen in a rudimentary form by the Ricardian socialist school). He developed this theory of exploitation in Das Kapital, a dialectical investigation into the forms value relations take.

Marx's theory of business cycles; of economic growth and development, especially in two sector models; and of the declining rate of profit, or crisis theory are other important elements of Marx's political economy. Marx later made tentative movements towards econometric investigations of his ideas, but the necessary statistical techniques of national accounting only emerged in the following century. In any case, it has proved difficult to adapt Marx's economic concepts, which refer to social relations, to measurable aggregated stocks and flows. In recent decades, a loose "quantitative" school of Marxist economists has emerged. While it may be impossible to find exact measures of Marx's variables from price data, approximations of basic trends are possible.

== French socialism ==
=== Louis Blanc ===
Louis Blanc is perhaps best known for originating the social principle, later adopted by Marx, of how labor and income should be distributed: "From each according to his abilities, to each according to his needs".

=== Charles Fourier and Henri de Saint-Simon ===
In 1833, France was experiencing a number of social problems arising out of the Industrial Revolution. A number of sweeping plans of reform were developed by thinkers on the left. Among the more grandiose were the plans of Charles Fourier and the followers of Henri de Saint-Simon. Fourier wanted to replace modern cities with utopian communities while the Saint-Simonians advocated directing the economy by manipulating credit. Although these programs did not have much support, they did expand the political and social imagination of their contemporaries, including Marx.

=== Pierre-Joseph Proudhon ===
Proudhon participated in the February 1848 uprising and the composition of what he termed the first republican proclamation of the new republic. However, he had misgivings about the new government because it was pursuing political reform at the expense of the socio-economic reform, which Proudhon considered basic. Proudhon published his own perspective for reform, Solution du problème social, in which he laid out a program of mutual financial cooperation among workers. He believed this would transfer control of economic relations from capitalists and financiers to workers. It was Proudhon's book What Is Property? that convinced the young Marx that private property should be abolished.

In one of his first works, The Holy Family, Marx said: "Not only does Proudhon write in the interest of the proletarians, he is himself a proletarian, an ouvrier. His work is a scientific manifesto of the French proletariat". However, Marx disagreed with Proudhon's anarchism and later published vicious criticisms of Proudhon. Marx wrote The Poverty of Philosophy as a refutation of Proudhon's The Philosophy of Poverty (1847). In his socialism, Proudhon was followed by Mikhail Bakunin. After Bakunin's death, his libertarian socialism diverged into anarcho-communism and collectivist anarchism, with notable proponents such as Peter Kropotkin and Joseph Déjacque.

=== Jean-Jacques Rousseau ===
Rousseau was one of the first modern writers to seriously attack the institution of private property and therefore is sometimes considered a forebear of modern socialism and communism, though Marx rarely mentions Rousseau in his writings. He argued that the goal of government should be to secure freedom, equality and justice for all within the state, regardless of the will of the majority. From Rousseau came the idea of egalitarian democracy.

== Other influences ==
=== Lewis H. Morgan ===
Lewis Henry Morgan's descriptions of "communism in living" as practiced by the Haudenosaunee of North America, through research enabled by and coauthored with Ely S. Parker, had a large influence on the work and political philosophy of Marx and Engels. Though the belief of this "primitive communism" as based on Morgan's work is flawed due to Morgan's misunderstandings of Haudenosaunee society and his, since proven wrong, theory of social evolution. Marx wrote a collection of notebooks from his reading of Morgan but did not develop them in to published works before his death.

=== Friedrich Engels ===
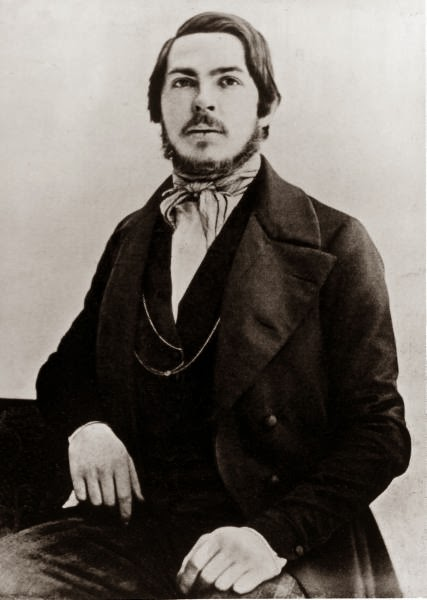
An early photograph of Engels from around the time he wrote The Condition of the Working Class in England, thought to show him aged 20–25 (c. 1840–45)

Marx's revision of Hegelianism was also influenced by Engels' 1845 book, The Condition of the Working Class in England, which led Marx to conceive of the historical dialectic in terms of class conflict and to see the modern working class as the most progressive force for revolution. Thereafter, Marx and Engels worked together for the rest of Marx's life so that the collected works of Marx and Engels are generally published together, almost as if the output of one person. Important publications, such as The German Ideology and The Communist Manifesto, were joint efforts. Engels says that "I cannot deny that both before and during my 40 years' collaboration with Marx I had a certain independent share in laying the foundation of the theory, and more particularly in its elaboration". However, he adds:

But the greater part of its leading basic principles, especially in the realm of economics and history, and, above all, their final trenchant formulation, belong to Marx. What I contributed — at any rate with the exception of my work in a few special fields — Marx could very well have done without me. What Marx accomplished I would not have achieved. Marx stood higher, saw further, and took a wider and quicker view than all the rest of us. Marx was a genius; we others were at best talented. Without him the theory would not be by far what it is today. It therefore rightly bears his name.

— Frederick Engels, Ludwig Feuerbach and the End of Classical German Philosophy – Part 4: Marx

=== Charles Darwin ===
In late November 1859, Engels acquired one of the first 1,250 copies of Charles Darwin's The Origin of Species and then he sent a letter to Marx telling: "Darwin, by the way, whom I'm just reading now, is absolutely splendid". The following year, Marx wrote back to his colleague telling that this book contained the natural-history foundation of the historical materialism viewpoint:

These last four weeks, I have read all sorts of things. Among others, Darwin's book on natural selection. Although it is developed in the crude English style, this is the book which contains the basis on natural history for our view.

— Karl Marx, 19 December 1860

Next month, Marx wrote to his friend Ferdinand Lassalle:

Darwin's work is most important and suits my purpose in that it provides a basis in natural science for the historical class struggle.

— Karl Marx, 16 January 1861

By June 1862, Marx had already read The Origin of Species again, finding a connection between Thomas Robert Malthus's work and Darwin's ideas:

I am amused at Darwin, into whom I looked again, when he says that he applies the "Malthusian" theory also to plants and animals.

— Karl Marx in a letter to Friedrich Engels, 18 June 1862

In 1863, he quoted Darwin again within his Theories of Surplus Value (2:121), saying: "In his splendid work, Darwin did not realize that by discovering the 'geometrical progression' in the animal and plant kingdom, he overthrew Malthus theory".

Having read about Darwinian evolution along with Marx, German communist Wilhelm Liebknecht later said that "when Darwin drew the conclusions from his research work and brought them to the knowledge of the public, we spoke of nothing else for months but Darwin and the enormous significance of his scientific discoveries". Historian Richard Weikart points out that Marx had started to attend "a series of lectures by Thomas Henry Huxley on evolution".

In August 1866, Marx referred to Pierre Trémaux's Origine et transformations de l'homme et des autres êtres (1865) in another letter to Engels as "a very important advance over Darwin". He went further to claim that "in its historical and political application" the book was "much more important and copious than Darwin".

Although there is no mention of Darwin in The Communist Manifesto (published eleven years prior to The Origin of Species), Marx includes two explicit references to Darwin and evolution in the second edition of Das Kapital, in two footnotes where he relates Darwin's theory to his opinion about production and technology development. In the Volume I, Chapter 14: "The Detail Labourer and his implements", Section 2, Marx referred to Darwin's Origin of Species as an "epoch-making work" while in Chapter 15, Section I took on the comparison of organs of plants to animals and tools.

In a book review of the first volume of Das Kapital, Engels wrote that Marx was "simply striving to establish the same gradual process of transformation demonstrated by Darwin in natural history as a law in the social field". In this line of thought, several authors such as William F. O'Neill, have seen that "Marx describes history as a social Darwinist 'survival of the fittest' dominated by the conflict between different social classes" and moving to a future in which social conflict will ultimately disappear in a 'classless society'" while some Marxists try to dissociate Marx from social Darwinism.

Nonetheless, it is evident that Marx had a strong liking for Darwin's theory and a clear influence on his thought. Furthermore, when the second German edition of Das Kapital, was published (two years after the publication of Darwin's Descent of Man, and Selection in Relation to Sex), Marx sent Darwin a copy of his book with the following words:

Mr. Charles Darwin
On the part of his sincere admirer
Karl Marx

— London, 16 June 1873

Darwin wrote back to Marx in October, thanking him for having sent his work and saying "I believe that we both earnestly desire the extension of knowledge".

According to scholar Paul Heyer, "Marx believed that Darwin provided a materialistic perspective compatible with his own", although being applied in another context. In his book Darwin in Russian Thought (1989), Alexander Vucinich claims that "Engels gave Marx credit for extending Darwin's theory to the study of the inner dynamics and change in human society".

=== Giambattista Vico ===
Giambattista Vico propounded a cyclical theory of history, according to which human societies progress through a series of stages from barbarism to civilization and then return to barbarism. In the first stage—called the Age of the Gods—religion, the family and other basic institutions emerge; in the succeeding Age of Heroes, the common people are kept in subjection by a dominant class of nobles; in the final stage—the Age of Men—the people rebel and win equality, but in the process society begins to disintegrate. Vico's influence on Marx is obvious.

=== Classical materialism ===
Marx was influenced by classical materialism, especially Epicurus (to whom Marx dedicated his thesis "Difference of Natural Philosophy Between Democritus and Epicurus", 1841) for his materialism and theory of clinamen which opened up a realm of liberty.
