= The Red Republican =

British socialist newspaper

The headline of the Red Republican, November 1850

The Red Republican was a British newspaper espousing socialist views. It was published from 22 June 1850 to 30 November 1850, after which it was renamed The Friend of the People.

== Foundation ==
The paper was founded in 1850 by George Julian Harney. He had been forced to resign as editor of the Chartist newspaper Northern Star by its owner, Feargus O'Connor, who disagreed with his socialism.

== Newspaper ==
Harney tried to use the paper to educate the working classes about socialism and proletarian internationalism, and advocated socialism within the trade union movement. The Red Republican published the first English translation, by Helen Macfarlane, of the Communist Manifesto in 1850. The paper was not a financial success and closed down in December of the same year.

Subsequently, Harney published the Friend of the People (December 1850 – April 1852), Star of Freedom (April 1852 – December 1852) and The Vanguard (January 1853 – March 1853).
