= Peter Nothjung =

Peter Nothjung (24 July 1821 – 4 October 1866) was a tailor in Cologne, Germany, where he joined the Cologne Workers' Association. Nothjung also became a member of the Communist League. As such, he served as an emissary between the Cologne Workers Association and the Central Authority of the Communist League. Nothjung later was accused by Prussian authorities of traitorous activities and became one of defendants in the "Cologne Communist Trial" in 1852.
