= Helen Macfarlane =

Feminist journalist and translator (1818–1860)

- Born: 25 September 1818; Renfrewshire, Scotland
- Died: 29 March 1860 (aged 41); Nantwich, Cheshire
- Spouses: Francis Proust (m. 1852, died); Reverend John Wilkinson Edwards (m. 1854)
- Writing career
- Pen name: Howard Morton
- Subjects: Feminism, Communism, Chartism, German philosophy
- Notable works: The Communist Manifesto, 1850 English translation

Helen Macfarlane (25 September 1818 – 29 March 1860) was a Scottish Chartist, early feminist journalist, and a philosopher. She is best known for creating, in 1850, the first English translation of The Communist Manifesto by Karl Marx and Friedrich Engels, which had been published in German in 1848. From April to December 1850, she contributed three essays for George Julian Harney's monthly, the Democratic Review, and ten articles for his weekly paper, The Red Republican.

In 1851 she "disappeared" from the political scene. Until research in the 21st century by Macfarlane biographer David Black, and by BBC Radio Scotland broadcaster Louise Yeoman, very little was known about many parts of Macfarlane's life. Yeoman wrote of her in 2012: "It is a truth universally acknowledged, that a period drama must be in want of a feisty heroine who finds love at last. But our heroine, Helen Macfarlane was no fictional character and her life would have shocked Jane Austen's smocks off."

== Early life ==
Macfarlane's father, George Macfarlane [or McFarlane] (1760–1842), was the owner of calico-printing works at Crossmill, Barrhead and at Campsie in Stirlingshire. Her mother, née Helen Stenhouse (born 1772), came from a similar middle-class family of calico-printers. Both families prospered in the production of 'Turkey Red' bandanas, which were very popular fashion items. Helen was the youngest of the Macfarlanes' eleven children. The workforce in the calico mills was highly unionised, but during the economic distress of the 1830s, the calico printers went on strike against the introduction of unskilled labour. The mill-owners (including the Macfarlanes) were able to call on the government to break the strike by sending in the Dragoons. There is, however, some evidence of radicalism in the Macfarlane-Stenhouse families, and especially in their calico printworks. According to Yeoman,

In the Stenhouse works in Barrhead, the workers were solid supporters of Chartism, the big movement founded [in 1839] to get votes for working people. Here they were all solid Chartists, solid radicals, so radical even the tulips are radical, because the works manager, his pride and joy were his tulips. They were all beautiful, they all had names, all had pedigrees and his best, his beautiful, tallest, most symmetrical tulips were all named after his favourite radical politicians. So if you're having a works manager who's a convinced radical, maybe the Stenhouses who own the place are a bit radical. Which makes me wonder if Helen drank in her radical politics from her mother's milk.

In 1842 the Macfarlane mills went under, engulfed by the rising tide of technology-driven competition between Scottish millowners. The Macfarlanes are utterly ruined. Helen and her sisters and brothers had to sign away everything, including their mills and their fine house at 5 Royal Crescent, Glasgow. In Helen's case the prospect of a genteel marriage perhaps to a rising young lawyer or the son of a good merchant was gone and she had to take employment as a governess. The year 1848 found Macfarlane in Vienna when the Revolution in Vienna against the Habsburg monarchy broke out. Later, in a critique of Thomas Carlyle, she wrote:

I am free to confess that, for me the most joyful of all spectacles possible in these times is the one which Mr. Carlyle laments; one which I enjoyed extremely at Vienna, in March 1848, i.e. "an universal tumbling of impostors..." For it amounts to this, that men are determined to live no longer in lies... Ça ira! And how do men come to perceive that the old social forms are worn out and useless? By the advent of a new Idea...

== Writings ==
Following the post-1848 counter-revolutions, Macfarlane returned to Britain, initially residing in Burnley, Lancashire, then in London. She began to write for the presses of George Julian Harney, and associated herself with Karl Marx and Friedrich Engels (who, in exile, had taken up residence in London and Manchester respectively). Macfarlane's first articles for Harney's monthly Democratic Review appeared under her own name in the April, May and June 1850 issues. Then, in June 1850 when she wrote for Harney's weekly The Red Republican (it was renamed Friend of the People in December 1850), she started using the nom de plume "Howard Morton". The real identity of "Morton" was not revealed until A. R. Schoyen's 1958 biography of Harney. Her translation of The Communist Manifesto appeared in The Red Republican in four parts (9, 16, 23 and 30 November 1850).

Macfarlane's own writings show a grasp of German philosophy (especially Hegel) that was unique among British radicals of the period. Surprisingly perhaps for a "Marxist", Macfarlane found common ground between Communism and the teachings of Christ:

Upon the doctrine of man's divinity, rests the distinction between a person and a thing. It is the reason why the most heinous crime I can perpetrate is invading the personality of my brother man, using him up in any way from murder and slavery downwards. Red Republicanism, or democracy, is a protest against the using up of man by man. It is the endeavour to reduce the golden rule of Jesus to practice. Modern democracy is Christianity in a form adapted to the wants of the present age. It is Christianity divested of its mythological envelope. It is the idea appearing as pure thought, independent of history and tradition.

On organised religion, Macfarlane complained,

All sects hedge me in with limitations. I cannot move a step in any direction without running into some creed, or catechism, or formula, which rises up like a wall between the unhappy sectarians and the rest of the universe; beyond which it is forbidden to look on pain of damnation, or worse.

In her writings on the politics of the Chartists, socialists and radicals of her day, Macfarlane saw a similar problem of "sectarianism". In calling for the organizational unity of the forces of "social propaganda" and "democratic agitation", she was criticizing Chartist organizational practice as ineffectual when compared to that of the French Blanquists:

How comes it that our French brothers have done so much compared with us? Because they are organized into one compact mass, which, under the guidance of competent leaders, moves like an army of well-disciplined soldiers, steadily onward to a given point. That is the reason of it. Frenchmen have the instinct of military discipline. We, on the other hand, carry the Saxon principle of the local management and the infinitesimal division of interests, too far. Absolutely this will not do in fighting a battle.

The one mainstream periodical to have a good word to say about The Red Republican was Reynolds' Weekly News, a Sunday paper founded in May 1850 by the physical-force Chartist George W. M. Reynolds (1814–79). Reynolds, knowing that Harney was having serious problems with the distributors and Her Majesty's Stamp Office, wrote:

This admirably conducted periodical is doing its work bravely. Energy, fearlessness, talent and variety combine to sustain its interest and value. Mr. Harney in his letters signed "L'Ami du Peuple" exhibits sound, statesman-like views, and shows up existing abuses with a merciless hand. His contributor Howard Morton is also a man of intelligence and shrewdness...

A Times leader quoted the following lines from Macfarlane's translation of the Communist Manifesto as "evil teachings":

Your Middle-class gentry are not satisfied with having the wives and daughters of their Wages-slaves at their disposal, – not to mention the innumerable public prostitutes – but they take a particular pleasure in seducing each other's wives. Middle-class marriage is in reality a community of wives.

The Times commented:

... only now and then when some startling fact is brought before us do we entertain even the suspicion that there is a society close to our own, and with which we are in the habits of daily intercourse, of which we are as completely ignorant as if it dwelt in another land, of another language in which we never conversed, which in fact we never saw.

Macfarlane fell out with her editor Harney at the end of 1850, The occasion was a New Year's banquet, organised by Harney at the Literary and Scientific Institute, near Fitzroy Square in London. The event was attended by Chartists and numerous exiled European revolutionaries, including Karl and Jenny Marx and Engels. According to Marx, Harney's wife Mary (like Helen Macfarlane a Scot) told Jenny Marx that she had declined Helen's acquaintance because of the antics of a man referred to as the "cleft dragoon" who, the evidence suggests, was Helen's fiancé Francis Proust, a revolutionary exile previously resident in Belgium. According to Marx,

Harney was stupid and cowardly enough not to let her get her own back for the insult, and so break, in the most undignified way, with the only collaborator on his spouting rag who had original ideas – a rare bird, on his paper...

Macfarlane's writings show an acute knowledge of Chartist affairs and international politics, written in a punchy, at times knockabout style, expressive of proletarian anger. She attacked the factional opponents of the Red Republicans within Chartism, as well as the great literary figures of her day, such as Thomas Carlyle, Charles Dickens and Alphonse de Lamartine. Her writings are full of literary references (to Homer, Sophocles, Miguel de Cervantes, John Milton, and Heinrich Heine) and show not only a thorough grasp of what was about to become known as Marxism, but also a familiarity with what later Marxists, such as Althusser, tried to "drive back into the night", namely the Hegelian dialectic. Black argues that historians of philosophy have ignored her role as the first British commentator on, and translator of, the writing of G.W.F. Hegel.

== Later life ==
In 1852 Macfarlane married Francis Proust and in 1853 gave birth to a daughter who they named Consuela Pauline Roland Proust (Consuela after the heroine of George Sand's 1842 novel Consuelo, and Pauline Roland after the noted French socialist feminist thinker 1805–52). In 1853 the family took a ship to Natal, South Africa to join Macfarlane's brothers, who had emigrated there. Tragedy struck. Macfarlane arrived in South Africa without her husband. Francis Proust was sick and had to leave the ship before it had even left British waters; he died shortly afterwards. On top of that, their eight-month-old daughter, Consuela, was also taken ill and died only days after her arrival in South Africa.

Macfarlane, widowed and bereaved, decided to return to England. In 1854, she met Church of England Reverend John Wilkinson Edwards, himself recently widowed with a family of 11 children, and in 1856 she accepted his offer of marriage. Macfarlane, the first English translator of The Communist Manifesto, became a vicar's wife, at St Michael's Church, Baddiley, in the sleepy, leafy Cheshire parish, just outside Nantwich. Helen gave birth to two boys, Herbert and Walter. She was not able to enjoy her quiet life for long. In 1860, at the age of 41, she fell ill with bronchitis and died. She is buried in the churchyard of St. Michael's. The inscription on the gravestone reads: "Sacred to the memory of Helen, wife of the Rev. John W Edwards, who fell asleep in Jesus, March the 29th 1860, aged 41 years. So he giveth his beloved sleep."

Macfarlane, who fulminated in her writings against the Anglican church (and organised religion generally), died in its embrace. It should be remembered, however, that Macfarlane merged Christianity with Communism:

I think one of the most astonishing experiences in the history of humanity was the appearance of the democratic idea in the person of a poor despised Jewish proletarian, the Galilean carpenter's son who worked probably at his fathers trade till he was 30 years of age and then began to teach his idea, wrapped in parables and figures to other working men, chiefly fishermen who listened to him while they mended their nets or cast them into the lake of Gennesaret.

== Literature ==
- Black, David (2004). Helen Macfarlane: A Feminist, Revolutionary Journalist, and Philosopher in Mid-Nineteenth-Century England. Lanham, Maryland: Lexington Books. ISBN 978-0739108635.
- Black, David, ed. (2014). Helen MacFarlane: Red Republican: Essays, Articles and Her Translation of the Communist Manifesto. London: Unkant Publishers. ISBN 978-0992650919.
- Black, David (2024). Red Antigone: The Life and World of Helen Macfarlane: 1818-60 - Chartist Journalist, Feminist Revolutionary and Translator of the Communist Manifesto. London: BPC Books. ISBN 979-8880279302.
- Schoyen, A. R. (1958). The Chartist Challenge: A Portrait of George Julian Harney. London: Heinemann. OCLC 208952.
- BBC Radio Scotland documentary; Women with a Past series, Episode 3 "Helen Macfarlane", broadcast 26 November 2012; presented by Susan Morrison, produced by Louise Yeoman; featuring interviews with Liz Arthur, David Black and Richard Holloway; Helen Macfarlane's words read by Gerda Stevenson. (Podcast)
