= George Julian Harney =

British political activist, journalist, and Chartist leader

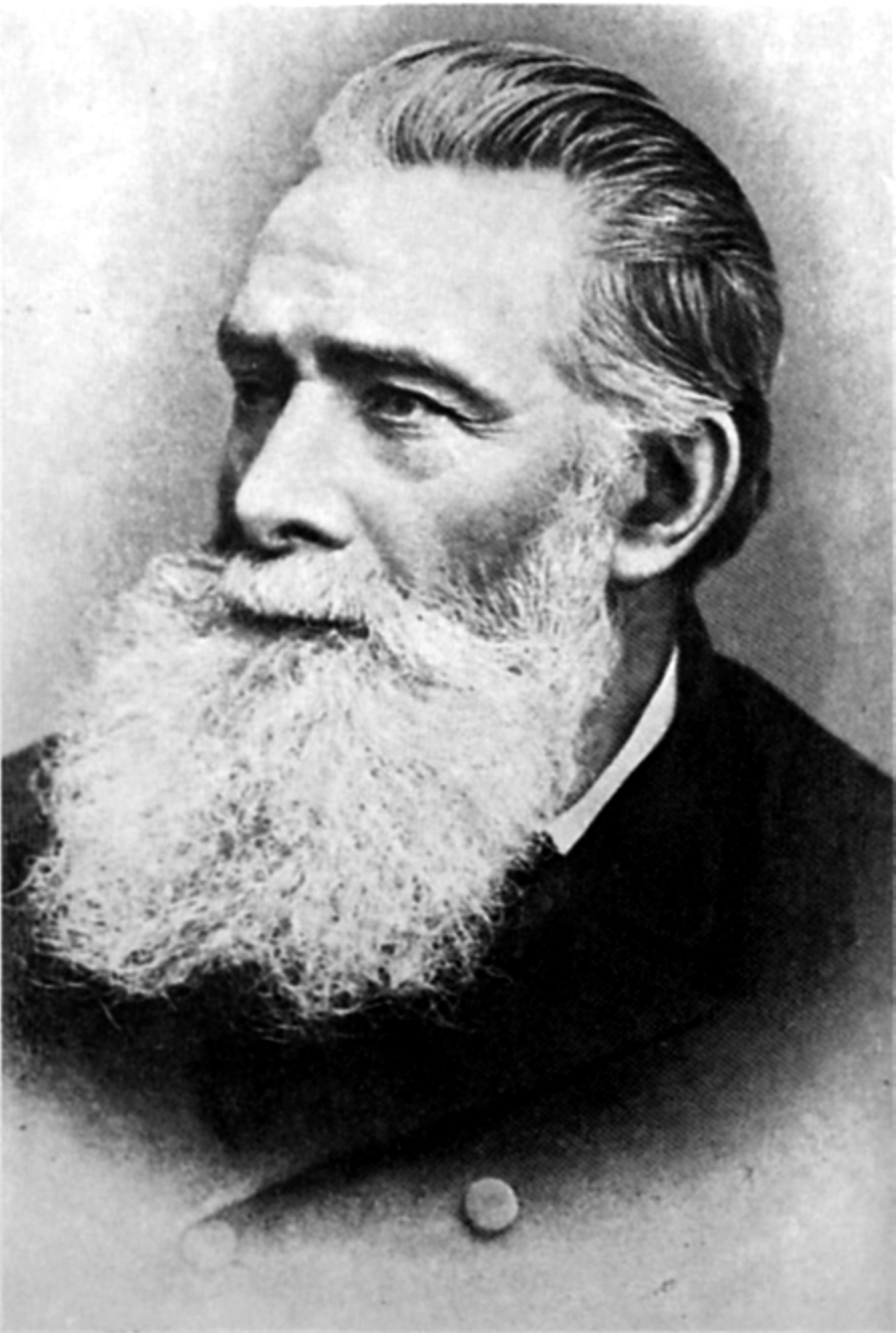
- George Julian Harney in 1880
- Born: 17 February 1817; Deptford, London, United Kingdom
- Died: 9 December 1897 (aged 80); United Kingdom
- Resting place: Richmond Cemetery
- Occupations: Journalist, newspaper editor, publisher

George Julian Harney (17 February 1817 – 9 December 1897) was a British political activist, journalist, and Chartist leader. He was also associated with Marxism, socialism, and universal suffrage.

== Early life ==
George Julian Harney, the son of a seaman, was born in Deptford in south-east London. When Harney was eleven he entered the Boys' Naval School at Greenwich for training as a merchant sailor. For six months he was at sea, going to Lisbon and Brazil. However, instead of pursuing a career in the navy he became a shop-boy for Henry Hetherington, the editor of the Poor Man's Guardian. Harney joined the National Union of the Working Classes early in 1833. Harney was imprisoned three times (twice in London, at Coldbath Fields Prison and the Borough Compter, and once in Derby Gaol) for selling unstamped newspapers. From the dock at Derby, Harney is reported as having said:

"These laws were not made by him or his ancestors, and therefore he was not bound to obey them. The government of Lord Castlereagh, of notorious memory, was the author of the laws against the press, but the Whigs, who had strenuously opposed their enactment, were now the parties to enforce them. In spite, however, of all their efforts, he declared that knowledge should be untaxed. He had already been imprisoned for selling these papers, and was ready to go to prison again, and his place would be supplied by another person devoted to the cause. He defied the government to put down the unstamped ... He had no goods to be destrained upon, and if he had, neither his majesty or any of his minions should have them."’

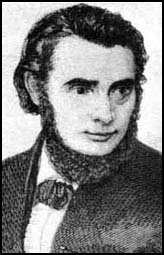
George Julian Harney in his youth

This experience had clearly radicalised Harney and his defiant and irascible tone in the fight against Taxes on Knowledge is unmistakable, it led to him receiving a severe punishment of a fine of £20 or six months’ imprisonment. He had served three prison terms before he was nineteen years old. Although he was initially a member of the London Working Men's Association he became impatient with the organisation's failure to make much progress in the efforts to obtain universal suffrage. Harney was influenced by the more militant ideas of William Benbow and Feargus O'Connor. His greatest intellectual influence was the Irishman James Bronterre O'Brien (1805-1864), the so-called "schoolmaster of Chartism"; Bronterre saw distinct parallels between the revolutionary events in France of 1791 and in England in 1832. He published a translation in 1836 of the Italian writer Philippe Buonarroti's History of Babeuf's Conspiracy for Equality, as well as a revisionist reading of the "Life & Character of Maximilian Robespierre" (London, 1837). According to Alfred Plummer, all of these were first published in instalments in the respective newspapers.

In January 1837 Harney became one of the founders of the openly republican East London Democratic Association. Soon afterwards Harney became convinced of William Benbow's theory that a Grand National Holiday (a General strike) would result in an uprising and a change in the political system.

== Involvement with Chartist movement ==
Harney attended the first National Convention of the Chartists that met on Monday, 4 February 1839, at the British Coffee House, 27, Cockspur Street, London. There were seventy-one delegates. Harney, together with Robert Lowery and Dr. John Taylor was a delegate for Newcastle upon Tyne. Harney and William Benbow convinced the delegates to call a Grand National Holiday on 12 August. Feargus O'Connor argued against the plan but was defeated. Harney and Benbow toured the country in an attempt to persuade workers to join the strike. When Harney and Benbow were both arrested at the end of July and charged with making seditious speeches, the General Strike was called off. A. R. Schoyen has given a wonderful example (from 1839) of the perceived seditious nature in some of Harney's speeches:

"Our Country may be compared to a bedstead full of nasty, filthy, crawling Aristocratic and Shopocratic bugs. In answer to our calumniators who say we wish to destroy property, I answer that we will not destroy the bedstead, but we will annihilate the bugs."

A further example in the same year was at Derby:

"We demand Universal Suffrage, because we believe the universal suffrage will bring universal happiness. Time was when every Englishman had a musket in his cottage, and along with it hung a flitch of bacon; now there was no flitch of bacon for there was no musket; let the musket be restored and the flitch of bacon would soon follow. You will get nothing from your tyrants but what you can take, and you can take nothing unless you are properly prepared to do so. In the words of a good man, then, I say 'Arm for peace, arm for liberty, arm for justice, arm for the rights of all, and the tyrants will no longer laugh at your petitions'. Remember that."

Harney was kept in Warwick Gaol. "on 13th August 1839, George Julian Harney wrote from Warwick Gaol saying that he could not obtain bail and had no funds to pay the expenses of lawyers and witnesses. When, two days later, bail had been found and he was released, he could not return to London as he was still ‘completely pennyless" When he appeared at Birmingham Assizes the grand jury refused to indict him of sedition or any other charge.

After his acquittal he spent almost a year in Scotland, and in September 1840 married Mary Cameron, of Mauchline, Ayrshire, "'tall, beautiful, and of high spirit' (Holyoake) and the daughter of a radical weaver. It was a meeting of minds and an immensely happy union (although there were to be no children)." Harney's exile did not last long and the following year he became the Chartist organiser in Sheffield. During the strikes of 1842, Harney was one of the 58 Chartists arrested "for taking part in a Convention at Manchester" and tried at Lancaster in March 1843. After his conviction was reversed on appeal, Harney became a journalist for O'Connor's Northern Star. Two years later he became the editor of the newspaper.

Tristram Hunt describes him during this period:

George Julian Harney, Chartism's enfant terrible ... was firmly on the radical side of the movement, advocating the use of physical force and enjoying riling his conservative comrades by flaunting the red cap of liberty at public meetings. In and out of jail, endlessly feuding with fellow Chartists, and ultimately expelled from the party, the Robespierre-admiring Harney remained convinced that insurrection was the surest route to achieve the demands of the charter.

According to Dorothy Thompson, Harney:

is a particularly good figure to take as central to the study of Chartism. For five years (1845–50) he was the editor of the Northern Star. He was one of the few leading figures who entered the movement in its earliest days–coming in straight from an active part in the dramatic and principled fight against the stamp duties on newspapers which is one of the highlights of 19th century radical action–and remained active throughout the years of its mass influence.

== Association with Marx and Engels ==
Harney became interested in the international struggle for universal suffrage and helped establish the Fraternal Democrats in September 1845. In conversation Harney told Edward Aveling: "I knew Engels, he was my friend and occasional correspondent over half a century. It was in 1843 that he came over from Bradford to Leeds and enquired for me at the Northern Star office. A tall, handsome young man, with a countenance of almost boyish youthfulness, whose English, in spite of his German birth and education, was even then remarkable for its accuracy. He told me he was a constant reader of the Northern Star and took a keen interest in the Chartist movement. Thus began our friendship over fifty years ago." Engels, then aged 23, was collecting material for his book "The Condition of the Working Class in England". The Marx-Engels archives in Amsterdam holds 110 letters Harney wrote to Frederick Engels over the years from 1849 to 1895. Engels’ own letters are not extant. Harney persuaded both men to write articles for the Northern Star. The first article written by Engels was "Progress of Communism in Germany. Persecution of Swiss Communists" (9 December 1843). There is a comprehensive list of all the articles that Engels wrote for The Northern Star between 1843 and 1849. The first article written by Marx and Engels together was the "Address of the German Democratic Communists of Brussels To Mr. Feargus O'Connor" (17 July 1846). Harney first met Marx in November 1847. Excited by the continental revolutions of 1848, Harney travelled to Paris in March 1848 to meet members of the provisional government.

According to his friend and fellow radical, John Bedford Leno, Harney was:

"more conversant with foreign politics than any man I ever knew, and the first inquiries made by foreign refugees on landing on our shores was to forward the discovery of his whereabouts."

== Involvement with socialism ==
Harney was now a Socialist and he used the Northern Star to promote this philosophy. O'Connor, the newspaper's owner, disagreed with socialism and he pressurized Harney into resigning as editor. Harney now formed his own newspaper, the Red Republican. With the help of his friend, Ernest Charles Jones, Harney attempted to use his paper to educate his working class readers about socialism and proletarian internationalism. In 1847 Harney stood as the Chartist candidate against Lord Palmerston for the seat of Tiverton, an event described by Engels in an article for La Reforme thus:

"It will be recalled that at the last elections Mr. Harney, editor-in-chief of the Northern Star, was put forward as the Chartist candidate for Tiverton, a borough which is represented in Parliament by Lord Palmerston, the Foreign Secretary. Mr. Harney, who won on the show of hands, decided to retire when Lord Palmerston demanded a poll."

As Aveling pointed out who had spoken with Harney: "Of course these more or less abortive runnings of candidates were chiefly with the intention of making propaganda by speech. For example, the opposition to Lord Morpeth in 1841 gave Harney the opportunity of speaking at such towns as Leeds, Huddersfield, Bradford, Dewsbury, Wakefield. There was never any serious intention of going to the poll." Harney's speech at the Hustings was published in full in the Northern Star and reprinted and distributed widely in Chartist circles.

In June 1849, Harney launched his monthly journal Democratic Review of British and Foreign Politics, History and Literature. Articles from Karl Marx' Neue Rheinische Zeitung (1 June 1848 to 19 May 1849) appeared in serialised form in the April, May, and June 1850 issues. In 1850 the Red Republican published the first English translation of The Communist Manifesto with the opening lines: "A frightful hobgoblin stalks throughout Europe." The translation was done by Helen Macfarlane, a journalist, socialist and feminist of the time, who wrote for the Red Republican under the pseudonym Howard Morton. The Red Republican was not a financial success it lasted for 24 numbers the final issue being dated 30 November 1850. Harney followed it with the Friend of the People (December 1850 - April 1852), Star of Freedom (April 1852 - December 1852) and The Vanguard (January 1853 - March 1853), the weekly that only ran for seven numbers, coupled to which in the previous month his wife Mary Harney had died on 11 February 1853.

After The Vanguard ceased publication Harney moved to Newcastle and worked for Joseph Cowen's newspaper, the Northern Tribune(1854-1855).

== Life in Jersey; Harney's second marriage in 1859 ==
Harney travelled to meet French socialists living in exile in Jersey. It is said that he went there to declare his solidarity with the French writer Victor Hugo who, with his family, had been exiled from France by Napoleon III. Harney's second wife, Marie Métivier (née Le Sueur), was the widow of James Metivier, a prosperous shop keeper and temperance leader in Jersey. "She was a woman of intelligence and strong political conviction, Marie had taken piano lessons from Chopin and had been acquainted with George Sand and Chateaubriand. She was close friends with Anita Garibaldi and had served as a nurse in Garibaldi’s army out of sympathy for his cause." Marie and Harney were married on 25 July 1859, and Harney became a stepfather of James (b. 1853). They were very close friends of the Hugo's. Victor Hugo gave a tea service to Marie and an inscribed portrait of himself to Harney, the "eloquent and valiant writer". Victor Hugo also dedicated several volumes of his translation of Shakespeare to Marie Harney. In Jersey Harney became editor of the Jersey Independent (1856–62), transforming it from a twice-weekly into a daily newspaper. Harney's support for the North in the American Civil War upset the owner of the Jersey Independent and in November 1862 Harney was forced to resign.

== Emigration to United States and return to England ==
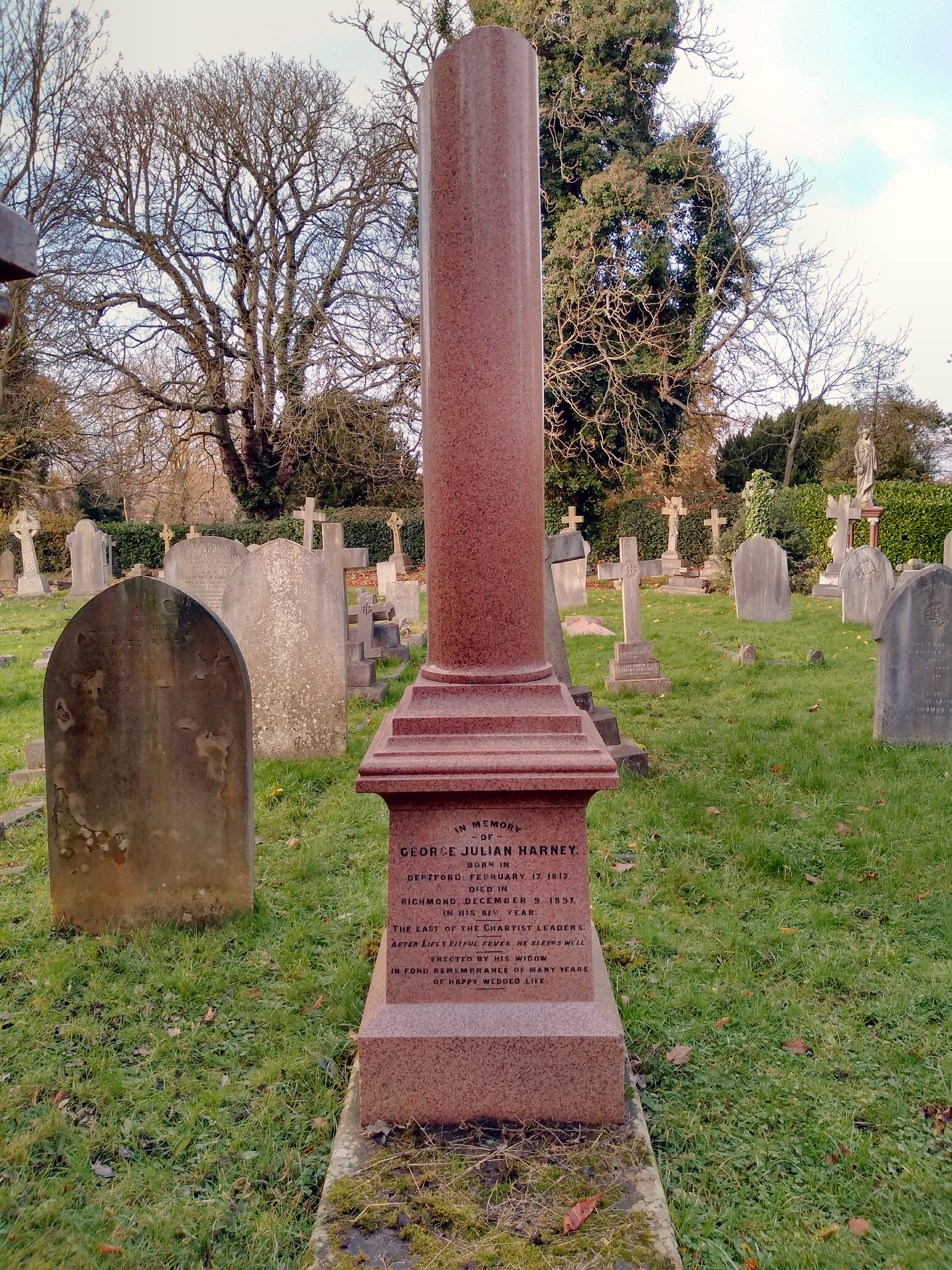
Harney memorial in Richmond Cemetery

In May 1863 he sailed to Boston where he had connections with the anti-slavery movement. During his first years in the United States he visited many northern states and met many politicians, among them President Abraham Lincoln. It was Charles Sumner, the abolitionist U.S. Senator, who had already corresponded with him when he was in Jersey, who helped Harney to settle in America. It was Sumner who had arranged his interview with Lincoln at the White House. "An invitation to become American "correspondent" for the Newcastle Weekly Chronicle was readily accepted and, during his twenty-five-year sojourn in Boston, Harney wrote countless letters and articles promoting American democracy and appraising the American way of Life." After a brief editorship of the antislavery newspaper The Commonwealth (1862-96), Harney obtained a post in the Massachusetts State House as a clerk in the Document Room. Even in this settled position Harney continued to study and meet American poets such as John Greenleaf Whittier, politicians, and old Chartist friends who had also moved to the United States. Harney continued in his post as clerk for over a decade, making extended trips back to England until 1888 when he finally returned to live at Richmond-on-Thames. According to Ashton & Hugman, Harney indulged in considerable political camouflage when describing America, providing a "naïve gloss on American politics", such that "he uniquely encouraged and sustained a belief in American democracy, helped to mitigate against anti-American sentiment, and promoted Boston as a favorable and hospitable destination for British immigrants." In his letters he sometimes refers to "our Republicanism" and he constantly held up and idealized those aspects of American society and aspects of its political and social life that cast a scathing and damning picture of the conditions back in England. Thus on the question of universal suffrage Harney could write in 1867 "The "bearing" of the above on the great question now agitating England, I need not point out to you.": "...no other topic can present such features of interest, especially at this moment. Our interest in American politics has been mainly that of a desire to see the disenthralment of an oppressed and cruelly wronged race. That victory for humanity we at length witness. What a revolution in six years! Will the British working man occupy as proud a political position as that now held by the negroes of the States, within six years to come? There is stinging humiliation for us Englishmen in the very question."

During the prominent secularist Charles Bradlaugh’s first lecture tour of the USA in 1873, Harney and Wendell Phillips had been his guide showing him around Boston. It is interesting that when he learnt about the intended American journey of agitation by the socialists Edward Aveling, Eleanor Marx-Aveling and Wilhelm Liebknecht in 1886, Harney expressed to Engels his concern for their safety, writing on 23 August from Newcastle: "I am sorry to know the Avelings are going to America. Pray urge caution upon them. After all the brag and bunkum, England is the true 'land of liberty' [... ] In my judgment Dr and Mrs Aveling had better leave well alone and stay where they are."

== History of Chartism ==
A letter of Harney's to the editor of the Weekly Chronicle written from Richmond-on-Thames on 3 August 1891, defended his friend Holyoake's use of the term "Jingo".

On 4 February 1893 Engels wrote to Harney to suggest that instead of his contributions to the Newcastle Weekly Chronicle, owned by his friend Joseph Cowen, he find an appropriate publisher and write a history of Chartism. He was aware of Graham Wallas's attempts to do something similar: "I have been aware of Wallas's intention for some time. If I were inclined to I could not prevent fulfilment of that intention - and as to anticipate him that would be impossible. A year ago, or more, I saw a prospectus - I think by Holyoake - of a course of lectures on Chartism by Wallas at the South Place Chapel, Finsbury." Harney's reply to Engels, that he considered "a very unsatisfactory letter" provides fascinating details as to his deteriorating health and financial insecurities, and the tone is one of resignation, admiring how Engels' retained his optimism. He lamented the fact that many of his books and pamphlets were still in America, and that he did not have access to all the materials. In a further letter of Engels it appears that he offered him money for a work on the history of Chartism that Harney, politely declined.

== Last interview and glimpse of his surroundings ==
Edward Aveling interviewed Harney late 1896 and he gave a description of his living space that is revealing:

I do not think I can give any better idea of the intellectual, moral, and political characteristics of Harney than by telling the reader of the portraits and the like that crowd his walls. I take them just as I saw them, working round his room. Fergus O’Connor; Frost; Joseph Cowen; Oastler, the Factory King; “Knife and Fork” Stephens, the physical force man, who spent eighteen months in Chester Castle; W. J. Linton, engraver and Chartist; Harney himself (he is even now a delightful bit of a beau in his way, as scrupulously dressed and groomed as ever), as a Yankee, with a moustache only, instead of the present venerable beard; Lovett, who drew up the People's Charter; Frederick Engels and Karl Marx, very fitly side by side (Harney had the high honour of their friendship); "Ironsides" Adams, of the Newcastle Chronicle. All these are on the walls by his bed and the fireplace that runs to the window, looking south. Over the mantlepiece is a group that reminds some of us younger workers in the workers' movement that perhaps we hardly pay as much attention to pure literature as our political forefathers did—Byron, Scott, Burns, Shelley, Moore, Pope, Dryden, the grave of Fielding, and, high over all, Shakespeare. Between the windows looking south are Miss Eleanor Cobbett, now ninety-one years of age, a letter from Cobbett himself, and the People's Charter. Between the windows and the door, Magna Charta, Darwin, Ruskin, Sidney, Chaucer, Raleigh, De Stael, Mary Wollstonecroft, together with a bust of Shakespeare again. And, by the door, there is a picture of Uncle Toby and the Widow Wadman.

Harney died on 9 December 1897, aged 80 at 2 Clarence Villas, St Mary’s Grove, Richmond. He is buried in Richmond Cemetery, south west London.

== Sources ==
- John Simkin "George Julian Harney" http://www.spartacus-educational.com/CHharney.htm
- Goodway, David. "Harney, (George) Julian (1817–1897), Chartist and journalist." Oxford Dictionary of National Biography. 23 Sep. 2004; Accessed 24 Sep. 2023. https://www-oxforddnb-com.wikipedialibrary.idm.oclc.org/view/10.1093/ref:odnb/9780198614128.001.0001/odnb-9780198614128-e-42340.
- John Bedford Leno, The Aftermath: With Autobiography of the Author (Reeves & Turner, London 1892)
- A. R. Schoyen, The Chartist Challenge. A Portrait of George Julian Harney (New York: The Macmillan Company, 1958)
- Edward Aveling, George Julian Harney: A Straggler of 1848. in: The Social Democrat, No. 1, January 1897, pp. 3–8., reprinted in: Contemporary Thought on Nineteenth Century Socialism. General Editors Peter Gurney and Kevin Morgan, Vol. IV. Anglo-Marxists. Edited by Kevin Morgan, (Routledge: London and New York, 2021), pp. 437–443. Aveling published here for the first time a letter of Harney's to Karl Marx (London, 18 Dec. 1847) that he had found amongst Marx's papers.
- Newcastle Public Library. The Harney Library. (Newcastle-on-Tyne: Co-operative Printing Society, 1899)
- "George Julian Harney On Engels", in: Reminiscences of Marx and Engels. (Moscow: Foreign Languages Publishing House,1957) pp. 192–193.
- The Harney Papers, a collection of George Julian Harney's correspondence. Frank GeesBlack and Renee Metivier Black, eds.(Assen, Netherlands: Van Gorcum & Comp. N.V., 1969)
- Margaret Hambrick A Chartist's Library (Mansell Publishing Limited: London and New York, 1986)
- Owen R. Ashton and Joan Hugman "George Julian Harney, Boston, U.S.A., and Newcastle upon Tyne, England, 1863-1888", in: Proceedings of the Massachusetts Historical Society, Third Series, Vol. 107 (1995), pp. 165 –184.
- Allen, Joan "The teacher of strange doctrines": George Julian Harney and the Democratic Review, 1849–1850. in: Labour History Review, 2013, 78 (1), pp. 67–86.
- Allen, Joan "The late-Chartist press in North-East England, 1852–1859", in: Papers for the People: A Study of the Chartist Press, ed. Joan Allen and Owen R. Ashton (London: Merlin Press, 2005)
- Goodway, David "The Metivier Collection and the Books of George Julian Harney.", in: Bulletin of the Society for the Study of Labour History. 49 (Autumn 1984): 57–60.
- "George Julian Harney, 1817-1897" https://www.chartistancestors.co.uk/george-julian-harney-1817-1897/
