= Hermann Wilhelm Haupt =

Hermann Wilhelm Haupt (1831 – 29 July 1886) was born in Germany in. He was a business clerk and became a member of the Communist League. However, he betrayed the other defendants during the Cologne Communist Trial and was subsequently released by the police during the official investigation.
