= Revolution and Counter-Revolution in Germany =

Book by Friedrich Engels

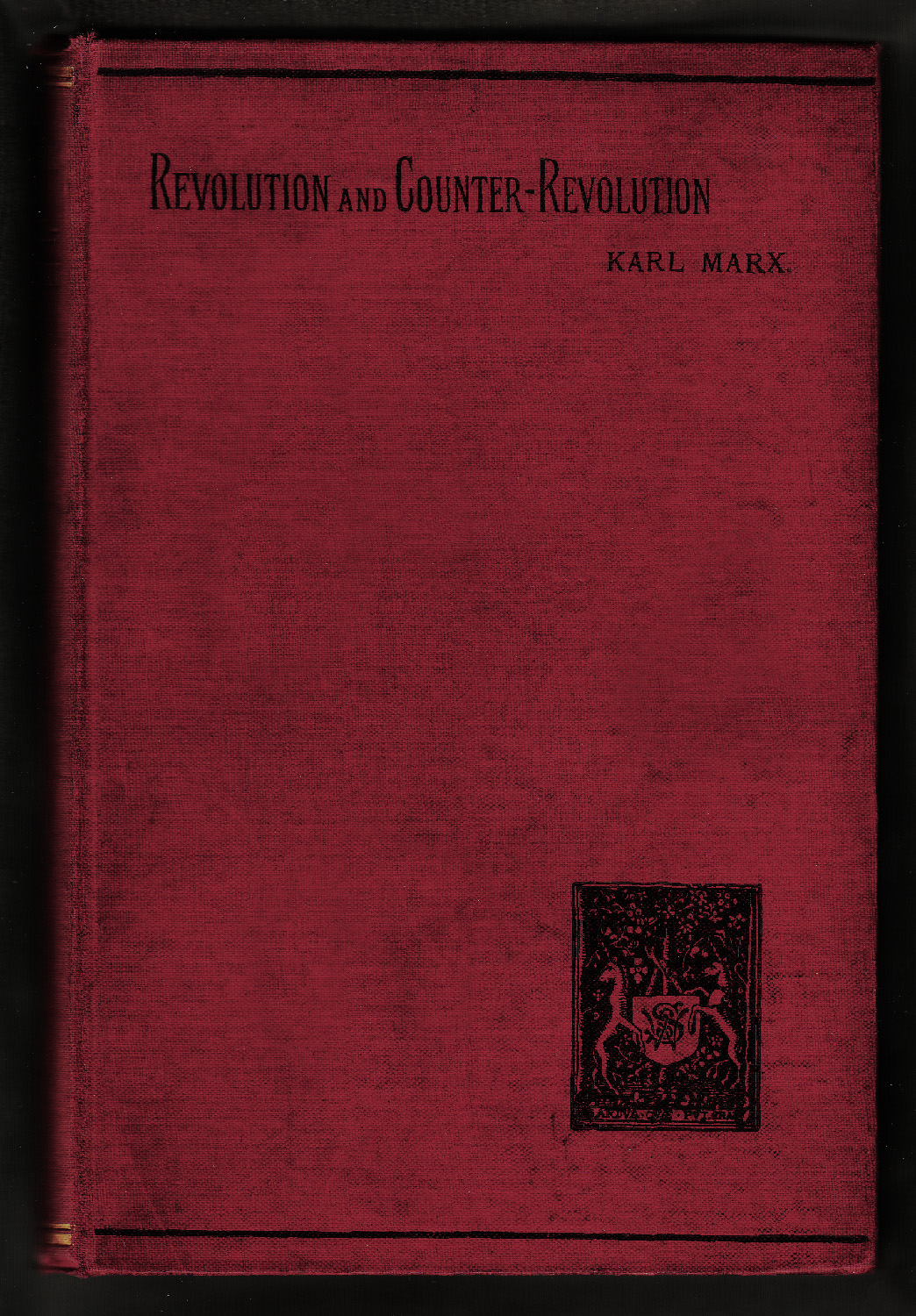
- Author: Friedrich Engels
- Publisher: Swan Sonnenschein & Co
- Publication date: 1896

Revolution and Counter-Revolution in Germany (German: Revolution und Konterrevolution in Deutschland) is a book by Friedrich Engels, with contributions by Karl Marx. Originally a series of articles in the New York Daily Tribune published from 1851 to 1852 under Marx's byline, the material was first published in book form under the editorship of Eleanor Marx Aveling in 1896. It was not until 1913 that Engels' authorship was publicly known although some new editions continued to appear incorrectly listing Marx as the author as late as 1971.

== Publication history ==
=== Original journalism ===
Early in 1851 Charles Dana, then an editor of the New York Daily Tribune, suggested to Karl Marx that he should contribute topical and historical writings to the newspaper. Dana was alerted to the possible availability of Marx by the suggestion of Ferdinand Freiligrath, a former associate of Marx on the editorial staff of the Cologne (Köln) newspaper Neue Rheinische Zeitung.

Marx was at the time engrossed in economic research and was unable to fulfill the commission, but on August 14, 1851 we wrote a letter asking his friend and co-thinker Frederick Engels to produce "a series of articles about Germany, from 1848 onwards." Engels agreed with this plan and over the next 13 months he went on to produce 19 articles on the 1848 German revolution for the New York press. Marx was closely consulted during the writing of this material and read over each manuscript before sending it for publication.

Even though written by Engels, these articles were published under the byline of Karl Marx, under the series title "Germany: Revolution and Counter-Revolution." Articles were not additionally titled, but instead appeared under a Roman numeral; individual titles were created in 1896 by editor Eleanor Marx Aveling for the first edition of the material in book form.

The articles ran from October 25, 1851 to October 23, 1852. After appearing in the Tribune the material was never published again in the lifetime of Marx and Engels, with the exception of the first two pieces, which were reprinted in German translation by the New-Yorker Abendzeitung late in October 1851. The "Revolution and Counter-Revolution" articles written by Engels were instrumental in establishing Marx with the Tribune and a journalistic relationship began which was to continue for more than a decade. Marx began to himself write for the paper in August 1852 when he contributed an article on the elections in England, writing first in German and making use of Engels and other friends to assist with the English translation.

By January 1853 Marx was fluent enough in English to write for the Tribune without additional editorial assistance. Marx would receive a very modest flat rate of £1 per article for these lengthy contributions.

=== Appearance as a book ===
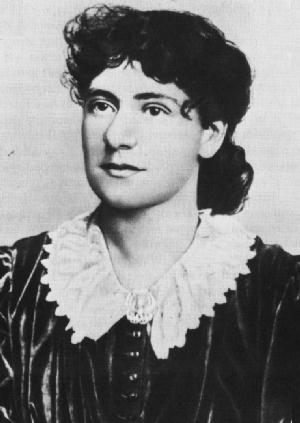
Eleanor "Tussy" Marx Aveling (1855-1898), editor of the first edition of Revolution and Counter-Revolution in Germany. The book was wrongly attributed by her to the pen of her father.

It would fall to Marx's youngest daughter, Eleanor Marx Aveling, to collect the "Germany: Revolution and Counter-Revolution" articles into book form. These first appeared in 1896 in a volume published by Swan Sonnenschein & Co. entitled Revolution and Counter-Revolution; or, Germany in 1848. Each of the 19 "Revolution and Counter-Revolution" articles were titled by Aveling and appeared as chapters.

As the original series had been cut short by one article for reasons of space, Aveling added a 20th and final article to the published collection to conclude the material — another piece by Engels but published under Marx's signature entitled "The Late Trial at Cologne" which had first appeared in the Tribune on December 22, 1852.

Distribution of the Aveling-edited Revolution and Counter-Revolution was handled in the United States by Swan Sonnenschein's American business partner, the publishing firm of Charles Scribner's Sons. The book was frequently reissued in succeeding years, including an 1896 German translation by Karl Kautsky which was titled Revolution und Kontre-Revolution in Deutschland (Revolution and Counter-Revolution in Germany). Kautsky's retitling of the material would come to be the commonly accepted name of this published work.

It was not until the 1913 publication of correspondence between Marx and Engels that the true authorship of the posthumously-published Revolution and Counter-Revolution in Germany became known. Despite this information, wrongly attributed editions continued to appear, including a 1952 edition by the British firm Allen and Unwin and a 1971 American edition by a small firm called Capricorn Books, both of which listed Karl Marx as the author.

=== Content ===
Revolution and Counter-Revolution is an account of what happened in Prussia, Austria and other German states during 1848, describing the impact on both middle-class and working-class aspirations and on the idea of German unification. Events in Austria and Prussia are discussed, along with the role of the Poles and Czechs and Panslavism, which Engels was against.

Also discussed is the Cologne Communist Trial, in which the defendants were acquitted after some of the evidence was shown to have been crudely forged.

=== Article listing ===
I. Germany at the Outbreak of the Revolution. (Oct. 25, 1851)

II. The Prussian State. (Oct. 28, 1851)

III. The Other German States. (Nov. 6, 1851)

IV. Austria. (Nov. 7, 1851)

V. The Vienna Insurrection. (Nov. 12, 1851)

VI. The Berlin Insurrection. (Nov. 28, 1851)

VII. The Frankfort National Assembly. (Feb. 27, 1852)

VIII. Poles, Tschechs [Czechs], and Germans. (March 5, 1852)

IX. Panslavism. The Schleswig-Holstein War. (March 15, 1852)

X. The Paris Rising. The Frankfort Assembly. (March 18, 1852)

XI. The Vienna Insurrection. (March 19, 1852)

XII. The Storming of Vienna. The Betrayal of Vienna. (April 9, 1852)

XIII. The Prussian Constituent Assembly. The National Assembly. (April 17, 1852)

XIV. The Restoration of Order. Diet and Chamber. (April 24, 1852)

XV. The Triumph of Prussia. (July 27, 1852)

XVI. The National Assembly and the Governments. (Aug. 19, 1852)

XVII. Insurrection. (Sept. 18, 1852)

XVIII. Petty Traders. (Oct. 2, 1852)

XIX. The Close of the Insurrection. (Oct. 23, 1852)

XX. The Late Trial at Cologne. (Dec. 22, 1852)

Source: Hal Draper, The Marx-Engels Register, pg. 141.
