= Philip J. Kain =

American philosopher

- Born: May 21, 1943 (age 83)

Philosophical work
- Era: 21st-century philosophy
- Region: Western philosophy
- School: Professor of Philosophy Emeritus at Santa Clara University

Philip Joseph Kain (born May 21, 1943) is an American philosopher and Professor of Philosophy Emeritus at Santa Clara University. He is known for his works on post-Kantian philosophy.

== Books ==
- Schiller, Hegel, and Marx: State, Society, and the Aesthetic Ideal of Ancient Greece. Montreal: McGill-Queen's University Press, 1982.
- Marx' Method, Epistemology, and Humanism: A Study in the Development of His Thought. Dordrecht: D. Reidel, 1986.
- Marx and Ethics. Oxford: Clarendon Press, 1988. Paperback edition 1991.
- Marx and Modern Political Theory: From Hobbes to Contemporary Feminism. Lanham, MD: Rowman & Littlefield, 1993.
- Hegel and the Other: A Study of the Phenomenology of Spirit. Albany: State University of New York Press, 2005.
- Nietzsche and the Horror of Existence. Lanham, MD: Rowman & Littlefield Lexington Books, 2009.
- Hegel and Right: A Study of the Philosophy of Right. Albany: State University of New York Press, 2018.
- Marx, Revolution, and Social Democracy. Oxford University Press, 2023.
