= Adolph Bermbach =

Adolph Joseph Maria Bermbach (14 December 1822 – 14 March 1875) was a German lawyer and revolutionary who worked in Cologne. Bermbach, a member of the Communist League, was a correspondent of Karl Marx and kept him abreast of anti-communist trials in Cologne after Marx had moved to London. Bermbach also was a witness for the defence at that the Cologne Communist Trial. He studied legal science in Bonn from 1841 to 1844. Later he worked as a notary.
