= Cologne Communist Trial =

Persecution of eleven communists in Cologne

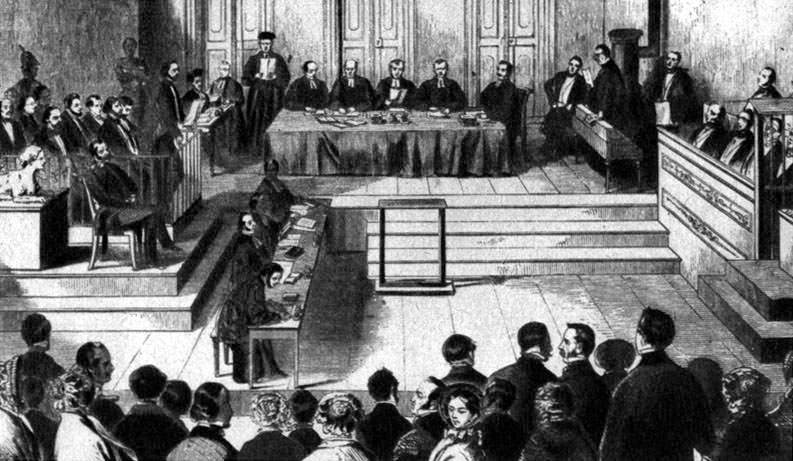
The Cologne Communist Trial

The Cologne Communist Trial took place in 1852 in Cologne, Germany, and was conducted by the Prussian government against eleven members of the Communist League who were suspected of having participated in the 1848 uprising. The trial lasted from October 4 to November 12, 1852, and when it was over the Communist League dissolved itself. Seven of the eleven were sentenced to prison terms of up to six years.

== History ==
In numerous legal proceedings, the authorities of the individual states of the German Confederation attempted to eliminate the opposition, including through regular court proceedings. Frederick William IV of Prussia himself, in the case of the Communist League, set the objective in a letter to the Prime Minister, Otto Theodor von Manteuffel: the task must be to spy on “the fabric of the liberation conspiracy” by all means. The "Prussian public" should be given the "yearned-for spectacle of an exposed and (above all) punished conspiracy."

The Prime Minister and the police authorities carried this out. They hoped thereby to also compensate for the loss of prestige they had suffered after the escape of dissident university professor Gottfried Kinkel from Spandau Prison. Their primary goal was not to eliminate the small, scattered groups of supporters, but rather to deliver a decisive blow to the leadership of the "revolutionary party." An opportunity arose in May 1851 when, by chance, the tailor Peter Nothjung was arrested at Leipzig's main train station during the Leipzig Trade Fair for lacking proper papers. He was carrying a letter of identification, various addresses, and copies of speeches by the Communist League, which the authorities used for house searches and arrests.

Through the cooperation of the state police forces, the reports reached the Prussian authorities, who then began investigating the emigrants from Germany in London as well, in order to find a solid case for the planned treason trial against Nothjung (Prussian Secret Police). The leading police officer in charge of the case, Wilhelm Stieber, reported from Cologne at the end of May 1851 that he had "uncovered a major conspiracy ." With the help of agents and informers, he compiled evidence, some of it fabricated, which was used not only in the upcoming Cologne trial but also in a public jury trial in Paris in 1852, as well as in Berlin, Mainz, and Bremen in 1853.

In the Cologne trial, the main charge was membership in the Communist League itself, which the government described as a "secret, subversive party" that was to be held responsible for the revolutionary events of 1848 in Cologne. In fact, the League had temporarily dissolved during the 1848 revolution, even though its members, as individuals, had played a sometimes not insignificant role. After the revolution, attempts were made to reorganize the League from London. However, political differences of opinion led to a split into two factions as early as September 15, 1850: one led by Karl Marx and Friedrich Engels, the other by Karl Schapper and August Willich.

In Cologne, a section of the Communist League had already formed in the spring of 1849. After the League split, this section was given the function of the "leading circle" by the "Marx Party." Although the Cologne members tried to promote their cause, the scope for (secret) political activity remained limited, and their efforts did not achieve the hoped-for widespread impact. The League had already failed politically when, in May 1851, the police began to arrest its members one by one.

== Proceedings ==
The opening of the trial, however, dragged on for almost two years, as the responsible jurists at the Cologne jury court could find no solid evidence in the police files. Partly due to pressure from the state, the trial finally began in October 1852. Nevertheless, it remained a risk for the government, since the Rhineland province 's legal system, based on the Code civil, differed significantly from that in the rest of Prussia. Thus, instead of judges appointed by civil servants behind closed doors, the principles of public proceedings and jury participation applied. However, some of these principles had also found their way into procedural law in other parts of the monarchy during and after the Revolution of 1848.

Among the defendants was Hermann Becker, later mayor of Dortmund and Cologne, who, despite his differences with Marx, saw the Communist League as an instrument for advocating politically for a republic. Also indicted were the physicians Roland Daniels, Abraham Jacobi, and Johann Jacob Klein; the chemist Carl Wunibald Otto; and the bank clerk Albert Erhard, who, while professing their radical democratic stance, denied membership in the League. In contrast, Nothjung, the publicist Heinrich Bürgers, the clerk Wilhelm Joseph Reiff, and the cigar maker Peter Gerhard Roeser admitted membership. Also indicted were the tailor Friedrich Lessner and the poet Ferdinand Freiligrath, who, however, managed to evade arrest by fleeing to London.

All the defendants were accused of having “instigated a conspiracy in Cologne during the years 1848, 1849, 1850 and 1851, the purpose of which was to overthrow the constitution and to arm the citizens and inhabitants against the royal authority and against each other in order to incite a civil war. Crimes against Articles 87, 89 and 91 of the Rhenish and Section 61 No. 2 and Section 63 of the Penal Code for the Prussian States.”

The trial initially attracted considerable public attention, and there were even demonstrations in support of the defendants. Although initially scheduled for only two weeks, the proceedings ultimately lasted more than six weeks, partly due to the examination of numerous witnesses. Karl Marx was informed of the proceedings' progress about two days late through stenographic reports in the Cologne Gazette and attempted from London to prove the forgery of the presented evidence. The defendants themselves largely succeeded in refuting the charges, and after some time, public interest in the sluggish progress of the trial waned. This changed when, on October 23, Police Commissioner Stieber presented what was purported to be the original minutes book of the "Marx Party," the contents of which were particularly damning in the case of the defendant Becker. However, this evidence, too, was forged, and Willich even had the forger arrested by the English police in London. His statement was sent to Cologne, but it never reached the intended recipients, who had also been arrested. Apparently, the evidence was too questionable for the public prosecutor's office to use further.

The trial ended on November 12, 1852, with the jury's decision:

- Acquittal for Jacobi, Klein, Erhard and Daniels;
- Six years' imprisonment in a fortress for Röser, Nothjung, and Bürgers; five years for Reiff, Otto, and Becker; and three years for Lessner, along with the loss of their civil rights for five years and the obligation to bear all legal costs. Röser, Nothjung, and Bürgers were also to be placed under lifelong police supervision after serving their sentences.

The verdict was delivered under heavy military protection, but some disturbances still occurred.

== Principals ==
=== Defendants ===
- Heinrich Burgers
- Hermann Wilhelm Haupt
- Abraham Jacobi
- Frederick Lessner
- Peter Nothjung

=== Other involved parties ===
- Adolph Bermbach

== See also ==
- Revolution and Counter-Revolution in Germany
