= Jan Juta =

American painter

Jan Carel Juta
- Born: 1 September 1895; Cape Town, Cape Colony
- Died: 21 December 1990 (aged 95); Mendham, (Note: This may be either Mendham Borough or Mendham Township. The sources do not indicate which.) New Jersey, United States
- Spouse: Alice Ford Huntington
- Parent(s): Henry Juta and Helen Lena Tait
- Relatives: Jan Carel Juta (grandfather); Louise Juta (grandmother); Karl Marx (great uncle); Bob Huntington (father-in-law); Helen Dinsmore Huntington (sister-in-law); John David Davis (brother-in-law)
- Family: Huntington family (by marriage)

Jan C. Juta (September 1, 1895 – December 21, 1990) was an American painter and muralist closely associated with the writer D. H. Lawrence. He illustrated Lawrence's book Sea and Sardinia and executed a well-known painting of Lawrence which presently hangs in Britain's National Portrait Gallery.

Juta was President of the National Society of Mural Painters from 1949 to 1952 and again from 1975 to 1979.

After a career ranging from France and Italy to South Africa, Juta settled in Mendham, New Jersey, United States, where he died in 1990.

Jan Juta was the son of South African attorney and jurist Henry Hubert Juta. In 1934 he married Alice Ford Huntington, a New Yorker, daughter of the famous tennis player Bob Huntington and younger sister of the socialite Helen Huntington, thus becoming a member of the influential Huntington family by marriage. Alice had previously been married to Charles Henry Marshall III, son of the prominent 19th-century businessman Charles Henry Marshall II.

== Works ==
=== Paintings ===
- David Herbert Lawrence, National Portrait Gallery (UK)
- Untitled (Landscape with Cathedral), Smithsonian American Art Museum

=== Books ===
- Background in Sunshine: Memories of South Africa, ISBN 0-684-12754-7

=== Illustrations ===
- Sea and Sardinia, Lawrence
- Cannes and the Hills, by Rene Juta
