= Philips (family) =

Dutch-Jewish Patrician family

- family
- Country: Netherlands
- Founded: 18th century
- Founder: Philip Philips

Philips is the name of a Dutch Patrician family, known for founding the Philips Electronics company.

== History ==
The first known member of the family is Philip Philips, a merchant born about 1710 who came to the Netherlands from North Rhine-Westphalia and was married to Rebecca van Crefelt. His son Benjamin Philips (1767 – Zaltbommel) built a fortune selling tobacco. Benjamin's son, Lion (1794–1866) was married to Sophie Pressburg, an aunt of Karl Marx; Sophie's sister was Karl Marx's mother, Henriette Pressburg. Benjamin, Lion, and their respective families converted from Judaism to Christianity in 1826. Lion's daughter, Antoinette "Nannette" (or Netchen) Leonore Jeannette Roodhuijzen was the addressee of many of her cousin Karl Marx's letters and later, a member of the Dutch section of the International.

Lion's son Frederik Philips was a merchant banker who financed the setting up of the Philips lighting company which was run by his son Gerard Philips. After a few years Gerard was joined by his younger brother Anton Philips who revolutionised the fortunes of the company. Anton was succeeded by his son-in-law Frans Otten who was married to Anton's eldest daughter. After the outbreak of war in 1940, Anton fled to England in a company armoured payroll van along with Princess Juliana and several other members of the Dutch royal family. Frans Otten also spent the war in exile. Anton's only son Frits Philips remained in the Netherlands during the German occupation in order to protect its employees – some of whom were Jewish – and also prevent the company from being used to manufacture arms for the Nazis. Frits later succeeded his brother-in-law Frans Otten as head of Philips. When Frits retired his place was taken by his other brother-in-law Henk van Riemsdijk. It was rumoured that Frits continued to help run the company after his official retirement.

Frans Otten jnr. and Warner Philips jnr., great-grandsons of two former CEOs, co-founded a new lighting company (Lemnis) which has no connection with the Philips company and is not allowed to use the Philips name. According to former economist and family historian Warner Philips, no current member of the family has any business connection with the company, any shares which were once owned by the family were sold long ago to finance expansion.

Gerard and his brother Anton supported education and social initiatives in Eindhoven, including the Philips Sport Vereniging (Philips Sports Association), which they founded. From it the professional football department developed into the independent Philips Sport Vereniging N.V.

== Notable members ==
- Lion Philips (1794–1866), tobacco dealer, uncle, and friend of Karl Marx
- Sophie Pressburg, (1797–1854), wife of Lion Philips and aunt of Karl Marx

Son of Lion and Sophie Philips:

- Frederik Philips (1830–1900), financier and co-founder of Philips Electronics

Sons of Frederik Philips:

- Gerard Philips (1858–1942), co-founder of Philips Electronics. CEO 1891–1922
- Anton Philips (1874–1951), joined Philips Electronics in 1912 and CEO 1922–39

Sons of Anton Philips:

- Frans Otten (1895–1969), son-in-law of Anton. CEO of Philips Electronics 1939–61
- Frits Philips (1905–2005), a director of Philips Electronics from 1935. CEO 1961–71
- Henk van Riemsdijk (1911–2005), son-in-law of Anton. CEO of Philips 1971–77

Sons of Frits Philips:

- Anton (Ton) Philips, eldest son of Frits. Head of Philips Telecommunication Mexico 1968. Left the corporate environment after 12 years to pursue other interests.
- Warner Philips I (1938–2022), second eldest son of Frits. Held various executive positions at Philips during entire working life, retiring with the title of President-Commissionaire of the Board of Supervisors.
- Frits Philips (jnr), youngest son of Frits. Philips executive for 18 years, left to run own management training company.
