= Heinrich Marx =

Lawyer and father of Karl Marx (1777–1838)

- Born: Herschel Levi Marx; 15 April 1777; Saarlouis, Kingdom of France
- Died: 10 May 1838 (aged 61); Trier, Prussia, German Confederation
- Occupation: Lawyer
- Known for: Father of Karl Marx
- Spouse: Henriette Pressburg (m. 1814)
- Children: 8, including Karl and Louise
- Relatives: Laura Marx (granddaughter); Eleanor Marx (granddaughter); Jenny Longuet (granddaughter); Henry Juta (grandson)

Heinrich Marx (born Herschel Levi Marx, Yiddish: הירשל לוי; 15 April 1777 – 10 May 1838) was a German lawyer who was the father of the communist philosopher Karl Marx, as well as seven other children, including Louise Juta.

== Life ==
Heinrich Marx was born in Saarlouis into an Ashkenazi Jewish family with the name Herschel Levi, the son of Rabbi Marx Levi Mordechai ben Samuel Levi of Rödelheim (1743–1804) and Eva Lwow (1753–1823). Heinrich Marx's father was the rabbi of Trier, a role which his older brother, the Rabbi Samuel Marx von Trier, would later assume.

Heinrich Marx qualified as a lawyer in 1814, but upon Napoleon's 1815 defeat at Waterloo the Rhineland came into the conservative control of the Kingdom of Prussia. An 1812 edict, unenforced by the French, asserted that Jews could not occupy legal positions or state offices, and Prussian enforcement of the law led to trouble for Heinrich Marx.

Marx's colleagues, including the President of the Provincial Supreme court, defended him and sought an exception for him. The Prussian Minister of Justice rejected their appeals. In 1817 or 1818 he changed his name to Heinrich Marx and converted to Lutheran Christianity in the state Evangelical Church of Prussia to be allowed to practise law in Prussia. His wife and children were baptized in 1825 and 1824 respectively.

== After conversion ==
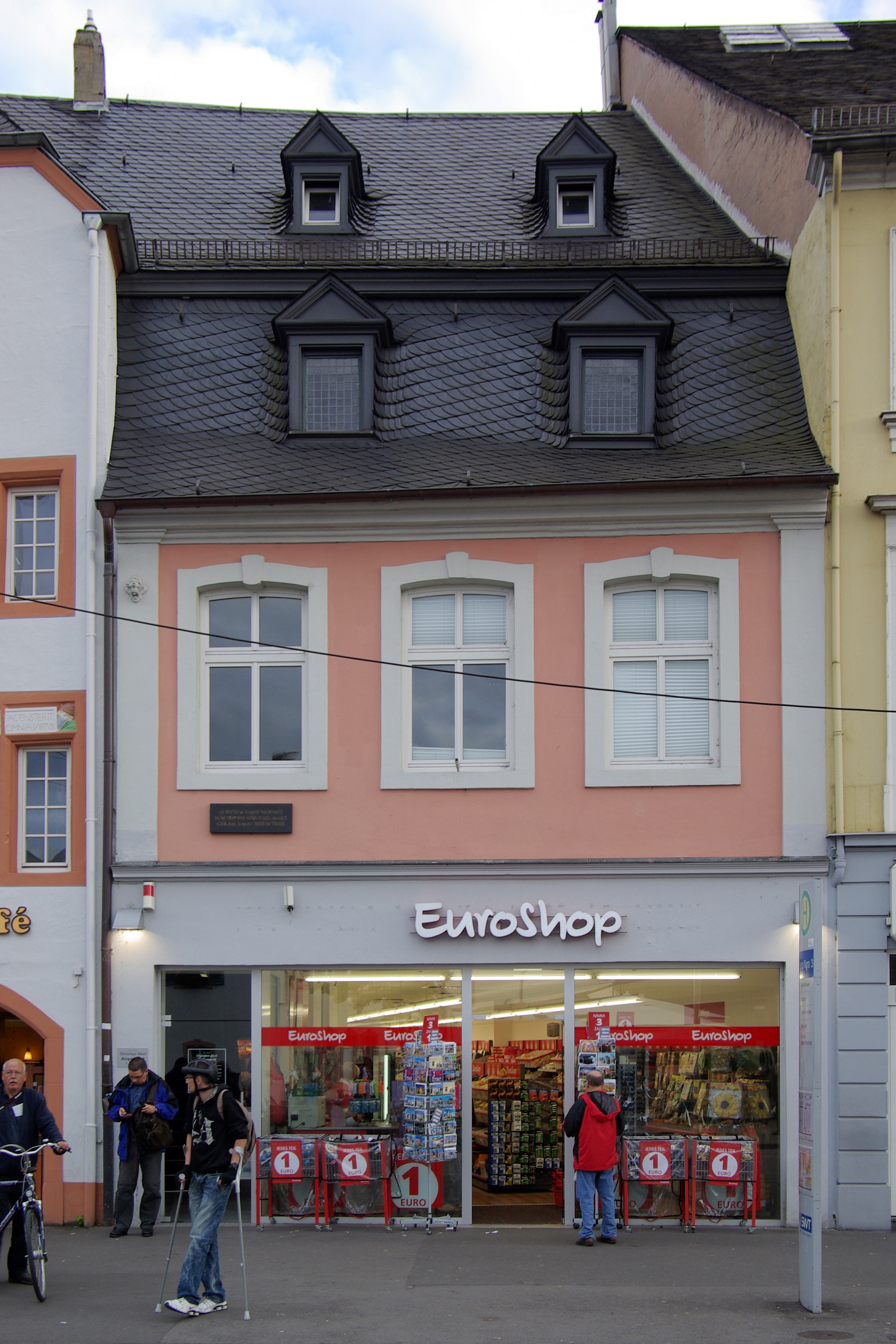
Simeonstrasse, Trier: Heinrich Marx's home from 1819 to his death in 1838

Even after becoming an Evangelical Lutheran Christian, Heinrich was largely a non-religious Christian. He was a man of the Enlightenment, interested in the ideas of the philosophers Immanuel Kant and Voltaire. A classical liberal, he took part in agitation for a constitution and reforms in Prussia, then governed by an absolute monarchy. In 1815 Heinrich Marx began work as a lawyer, in 1819 moving his family to a ten-room property near the Roman Porta Nigra archway. His wife, Henriette Pressburg (1788–1863), belonged to a prosperous Jewish business family from Nijmegen in the Netherlands. Henriette's sister Sophie Pressburg (1797–1854), Karl Marx's aunt, married Lion Philips (1794–1866), a wealthy Dutch tobacco manufacturer and industrialist, upon whom Karl and Jenny Marx would later often come to rely for loans while they were exiled in London. Sophie was the grandmother of Anton and Gerard Philips who later founded the Philips Electronics company.

Isaiah Berlin writes of Heinrich Marx that he believed

that man is by nature both good and rational, and that all that is needed to ensure triumph of these qualities is the removal of artificial obstacles from his path. They were disappearing already, and disappearing fast, and the time was rapidly approaching when the last citadels of reaction, the Catholic Church and the feudal nobility, would melt away before the irresistible march of reason... Born a Jew, a citizen of inferior legal and social status, he had attained to equality with his more enlightened neighbours, had earned their respect as a human being, and had become assimilated into what appeared to him as their more rational and dignified mode of life.

Heinrich Marx became a passionate Prussian patriot and monarchist who educated his family as liberal Lutheran Christians. He died of tuberculosis at age 61 and was buried in the Protestant cemetery in Trier.

== Relationship with Karl Marx ==
Heinrich had his son educated at home until the age of twelve. After graduating from the Trier Gymnasium, Karl enrolled in the Rhenish Friedrich Wilhelm University of Bonn in 1835 at the age of seventeen; he wished to study philosophy and literature, but his father insisted on law as a more practical field of study. At Bonn, Karl joined the Trier Tavern Club drinking society (Landsmannschaft der Treveraner) and at one point served as its president. Because of Marx's poor grades, his father forced him to transfer to the far more serious and academically oriented Friedrich-Wilhelm University in Berlin, where his legal studies became less significant than excursions into philosophy and history.

Even after Karl's move to Berlin, his parents remained concerned with his lifestyle and extravagance. After receiving a letter from Karl in November 1837, his father responded in critical fashion:

Alas, your conduct has consisted merely in disorder, meandering in all the fields of knowledge, musty traditions by sombre lamplight; degeneration in a learned dressing gown with uncombed hair has replaced degeneration with a beer glass. And a shirking unsociability and a refusal of all conventions and even all respect for your father. Your intercourse with the world is limited to your sordid room, where perhaps lie abandoned in the classical disorder the love letters of a Jenny [Karl’s fiancée] and the tear-stained counsels of your father. ... And do you think that here in this workshop of senseless and aimless learning you can ripen the fruits to bring you and your loved one happiness? ... . As though we were made of gold my gentleman son disposes of almost 700 thalers in a single year, in contravention of every agreement and every usage, whereas the richest spend no more than 500.

However, in spite of their disagreements, Karl always retained a strong affection for his father, his daughter Eleanor writing “he never tired of talking about him, and always carried an old daguerreotype photograph of him”. On Karl's death, Engels laid the photograph in his coffin.

== Ancestry ==
Ancestors of Heinrich Marx

Mordechai Marx Levi von Rödelheim
Samuel Levi Rödelheim
Mordechai (Marx) Levi
Malka Spira
Heinrich Marx
Aaron Lwow
Joshua Heschel Lwow
Keila Haim Isaiah
Moise Lwow
Isaac Aaron Worms
Merle Worms
Isaac Werth's daughter
Eva Lwow
Elijah Elias Eger
Meir Eger
Rachel Bella Eger
Bella Eger
Moses
Esther Moses

== Works ==
- Einige Bemerkungen über das napoleonische Dekret vom 17. März 1808 bei Gelegenheit der glücklichen Vereinigung unseres Landes mit der königlich-preußischen Monarchie (gedruckt in Adolf Kober: Karl Marx' Vater und das napoleonische Ausnahmegesetz gegen die Juden 1808
- Ueber den Werth der Handelsgerichte in den Königl. Preußischen Rheinprovinzen; In: Niederrheinisches Archiv für Gesetzgebung, Rechtswissenschaft und Justiz-Verwaltung; I. Bd., Köln 1817, p. 7 ff. (Digisat Archiv für Sozialgeschichte Bd.8, 1968, p. 277 ff. online)
- Festrede zu Ehren der Landtagsdeputierten vom 13. Januar 1834; gedruckt bei Heinz Monz: Karl Marx - Grundlagen der Entwicklung zu Leben und Werk; Trier 1973, p. 134
- Aus finsteren Zeiten. In: Neue Welt. Beilage Vorwärts Berlin 19. Jg. 1894, Nr. 18 and 19

== Literature ==
- Berlin, Isaiah. Karl Marx: His Life and Environment. Oxford University Press, 1963 ISBN 0-19-520052-7
- McLellan, David (2006). Karl Marx: A Biography (4th ed.). Hampshire: Palgrave MacMillan. ISBN 978-1-4039-9730-2.
- Nicolaievsky, Boris; Maenchen-Helfen, Otto (1976) [1936]. Karl Marx: Man and Fighter. trans. Gwenda David and Eric Mosbacher. Harmondsworth and New York: Pelican. ISBN 978-1-4067-2703-6.
- Wheen, Francis (2001). Karl Marx (PDF). London: Fourth Estate. ISBN 978-1-85702-637-5.
- Aus finsteren Zeiten. In: Neue Welt. Beilage Vorwärts Berlin 19. Jg. 1894, Nr. 18 and 19
- Bernhard Wachstein: Die Abstammung von Karl Marx. In: Festkrift i anledning af Professor David Simonsens 70-aarige Fodestag. Kobenhavn 1923, p. 278-289
- Eugen Lewin-Dorsch: Familie und Stammbaum von Karl Marx. In: Die Glocke. 9. Jg., 12923, p. 309 ff. und 340 ff.
- H. Horowitz: Die Familie Lwów. In: Monatszeitschrift für Geschichte und Wissenschaft des Judentums. 72. Jg., 1928, p. 487-499
- Bernhard Brilling: Beiträge zur Geschichte der Juden in Trier. In: Trierisches Jahrbuch 1958, Trier 1958, p. 46-50
- Adolf Kober: Aus der Geschichte der Juden im Rheinland. In: Rheinischer Verein für Denkmalpflege und Heimatschutz. 1931 Heft 1. Düsseldorf 1931, p. 11 ff.
- Adolf Kober: Karl Marx' Vater und das napoleonische Ausnahmegesetz gegen die Juden 1808. In: Jahrbuch des Kölnischen Geschichtsvereins e.V. Bd. 14. Köln 1932
- Hans Stein: Der Uebertritt der Familie Marx zum evangelischen Christentum. In: Jahrbuch des Kölnischen Geschichtsvereins e.V., Bd. 14, Köln 1932, p. 126 – 129
- Heinz Monz: Karl Marx und Trier. Verhältnisse Beziehungen Einflüsse. Verlag Neu, Trier 1964
- Heinz Monz: Die rechtsethischen und rechtspolitischen Anschauungen des Heinrich Marx. In: Archiv für Sozialgeschichte Bd. VIII, 1968, p. 261 ff.
- Heinz Monz: Die soziale Lage der elterlichen Familie von Karl Marx; In: Karl Marx 1818 – 1968 – Neue Studien zu Person und Lehre; Mainz, 1968, S. 67–130
- Adalbert Bauer: Karl Marx zum 150. Geburtstag. Kurzer Hinweis auf Vorfahren und Nachkommen. In: Genealogie. Deutsche Zeitschrift für Familienkunde. Bd. IX., 17./18. Jg., 1968/69, Neustadt a. d. Aisch 1968, S. 179–181
- Eugen Rapp: Epithaphen für Vorfahren von Karl Marx auf dem jüdischen Friedhof in Trier. In: Trierer Zeitschrift für Geschichte und Kunst des Trierer Landes und seiner Nachbargebiete. 1970, S. 175–182
- Heinz Monz: Karl Marx. Grundlagen zu Leben und Werk. NCO-Verlag, Trier 1973
- Heinz Monz: Die jüdische Herkunft von Karl Marx; In: Jahrbuch des Instituts für Deutsche Geschichte; 2. Band, Tel Aviv 1973, S. 173
- Richard Laufner / Albert Rausch: Die Familie Marx und die Trierer Judenschaft. Trier 1975 (Schriften aus dem Karl-Marx-Haus-Trier Heft 14)
- Heinz Monz: Der Waldprozeß der Mark Thalfang als Grundlage für Karl Marx' Kritik an den Debatten um das Holzdiebstahlsgesetz. In: Jahrbuch für westdeutsche Landesgeschichte. Bd. 3. Koblenz 1977, Sonderdruck p. 1-24
- Heinz Monz: Advokatenanwalt Heinrich Marx. Die Berufsausbildung eines Juristen. In: Jahrbuch für westdeutsche Landesgeschichte. Bd. 3. Koblenz 1977, Sonderdruck
- Heinz Monz: Advokatenanwalt Heinrich Marx. Die Berufsausbildung eines Juristen im französischen Rheinland. In: Jahrbuch des Instituts für Deutsche Geschichte. Bd. VIII. Tel Aviv 1979, p. 125-141
- Heinz Monz: Neue Funde zum Lebensweg von Karl Marx' Vater. In: Osnabrücker Mitteilungen. Bd. 87. Osnabrück 1981, p. 59-71
- Heinz Monz: Die Trierer Gehöferschaften als Vorbild für die senegalesischen Communautés rurales. In: Jahrbuch für westdeutsche Landesgeschichte. Bd. 11. Koblenz 1985, p. 153-184
- Manfred Schöncke: Karl und Heinrich Marx und ihre Geschwister. Köln 1993, S. 98-359 und 477-482 ISBN 3-89144-185-1
- Heinz Monz: Neue Lebensdaten zu den Vorfahren von Karl Marx. In: Landeskundliche Vierteljahresblätter, Trier 2004, p. 11
- Manfred Schöncke: Die Bibliothek von Heinrich Marx im Jahre 1838. Ein annotiertes Verzeichnis. In: Marx-Engels-Jahrbuch 2005, Akademie Verlag, Berlin 2006, p. 128-172 online
