= Eleanor Marx =

English writer and translator (1855–1898)

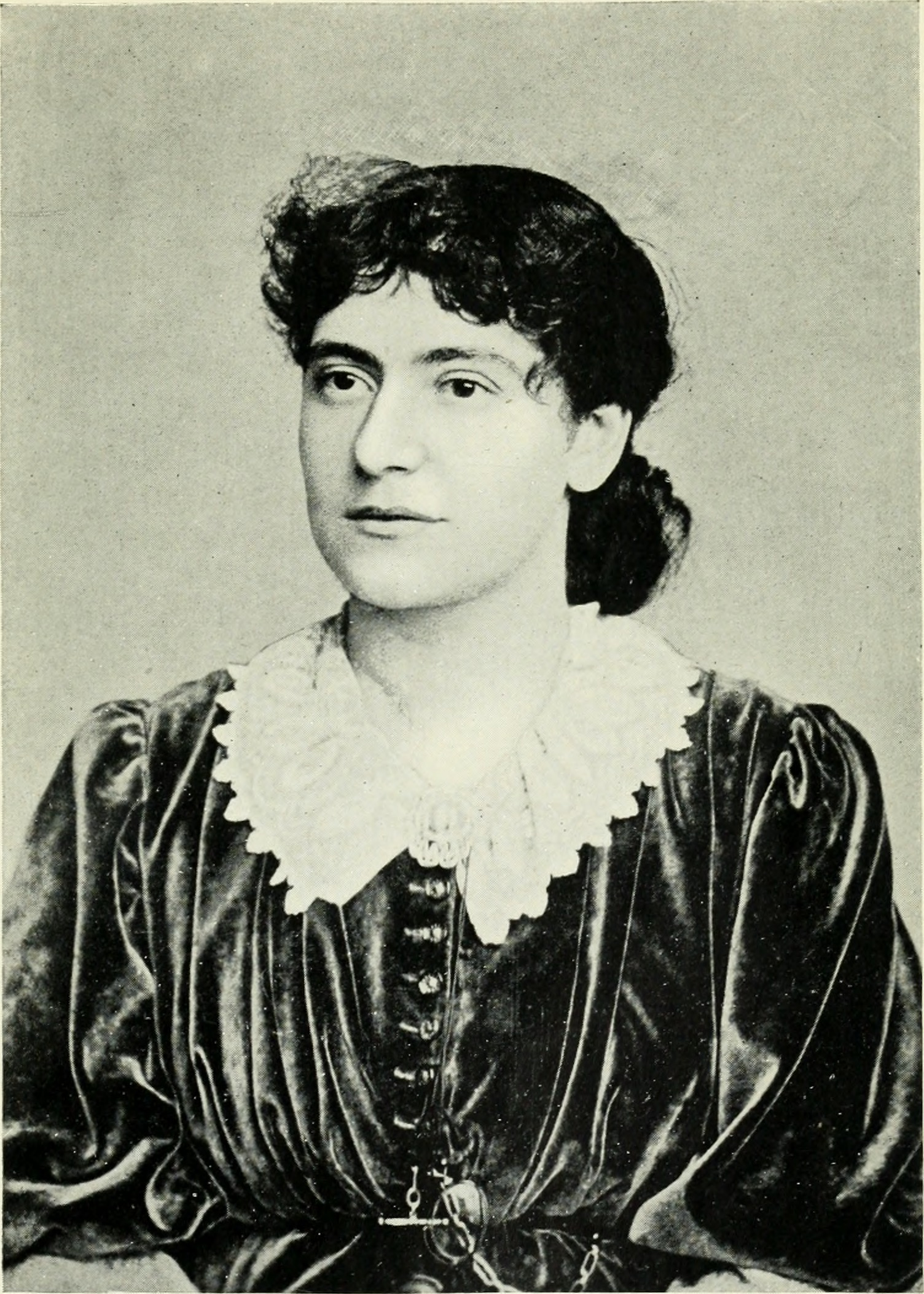
- Eleanor Marx
- Born: Jenny Julia Eleanor Marx; 16 January 1855; London, England
- Died: 31 March 1898 (aged 43); London, England
- Cause of death: Suicide
- Resting place: Highgate Cemetery
- Other names: Eleanor Marx-Aveling; "Tussy" Marx
- Occupations: Writer; translator; activist
- Partner: Edward Aveling
- Parents: Karl Marx (father); Jenny von Westphalen (mother)
- Relatives: Laura Marx (sister); Jenny Longuet (sister); Henry Juta (cousin); Louise Juta (aunt); Heinrich Marx (grandfather); Henriette Pressburg (grandmother); Anton Philips (second cousin); Gerard Philips (second cousin)

Signature
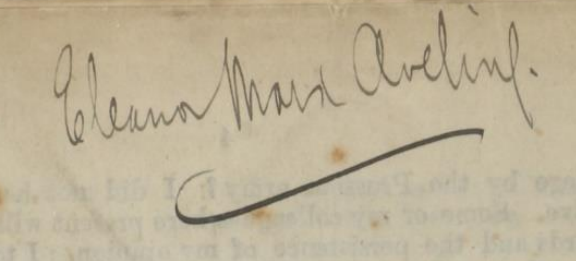

Jenny Julia Eleanor Marx (16 January 1855 – 31 March 1898), sometimes called Eleanor Marx-Aveling and known to her family as Tussy, was an English writer, translator, activist, and the youngest daughter of Karl Marx. A key proponent of socialism, she translated her father's writings and helped spread his philosophical ideas.

Additionally, she worked as a literary translator. She is particularly noted for her 1886 translation of Gustave Flaubert's novel Madame Bovary, which she introduced to the English-speaking world and became a global bestseller. She also translated several of Henrik Ibsen's plays, including An Enemy of the People in 1888 and The Lady from the Sea in 1890.

In March 1898, after discovering that her partner Edward Aveling had secretly married the previous year, she poisoned herself at the age of 43 and was buried in Highgate Cemetery alongside her father and other members of the Marx family.

== Biography ==
=== Early years ===
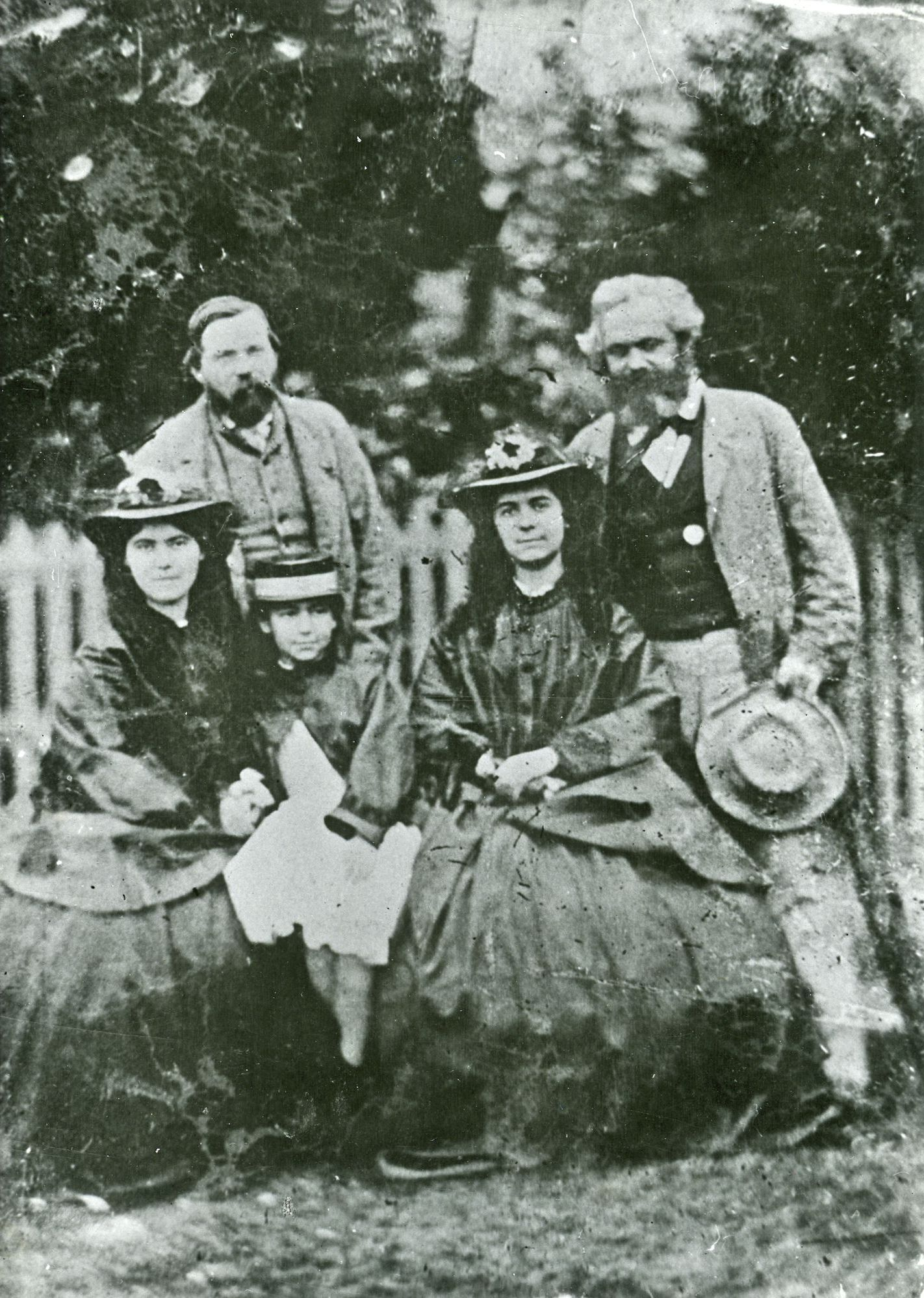
Eleanor Marx (middle) with her two sisters - Jenny Longuet, Laura Marx, father Karl Marx (right) and Friedrich Engels

Eleanor Marx was born in London on 16 January 1855, the sixth child and fourth daughter of Karl Marx and his wife Jenny von Westphalen. She was called "Tussy" by her family from a young age. She showed an early interest in politics, even writing to political figures during her childhood. The hanging of the "Manchester Martyrs" when she was twelve, for example, horrified her and shaped her lifelong sympathy for the Fenians. Her father's story-telling also inspired an interest in literature, and she could recite passages by William Shakespeare at the age of three. By her teenage years, that love of Shakespeare led to the formation of the "Dogberry Club" at which she, her family, and the family of Clara Collet, all recited Shakespeare whilst her father watched.

While Karl Marx was writing his major work, Das Kapital, in the family home, his youngest daughter Eleanor played in his study. Marx invented and narrated a story for Eleanor based on an anti-hero called Hans Röckle. Eleanor reported that it was one of her favourite childhood stories. The story is significant because it offered Eleanor lessons, by allegory, of the critique of political economy which Marx was writing in Das Kapital. As an adult, Eleanor was involved in translating and editing volumes of Das Kapital. She also edited Marx's lectures, Value, Price and Profit and Wage Labour and Capital, which were based on the same material, into books. Eleanor Marx's biographer, Rachel Holmes, writes: "Tussy's childhood intimacy with [Marx] whilst he wrote the first volume of Das Kapital provided her with a thorough grounding in British economic, political and social history. Tussy and Capital grew up together".

At the age of sixteen, Eleanor became her father's secretary and accompanied him around the world to socialist conferences. A year later, she fell in love with Prosper-Olivier Lissagaray, a journalist and participant in the Paris Commune, who had fled to London after the Commune's suppression. Although he agreed with the man politically, Karl Marx disapproved of the relationship because of the age gap between the two, Lissagaray being 34 years old. In May 1873, Eleanor moved away from home to Brighton working as a schoolteacher. She lived at 6 Vernon Terrace in the suburb of Montpelier, returning to London in September 1873.

In 1876, Eleanor helped Lissagaray write History of the Commune of 1871, and translated it into English. Her father liked the book but was still disapproving of his daughter's relationship with its author. By 1880, Karl changed his view of the situation, and allowed her to marry him. By then, however, Eleanor herself was having second thoughts, and she terminated the relationship in 1882.

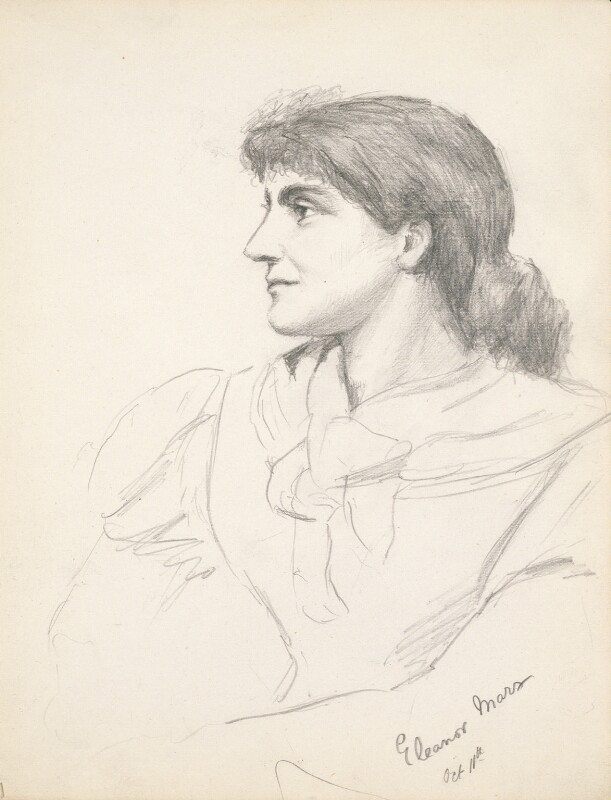
Eleanor Marx, pencil drawing by Grace Black (aka Grace Human) in 1881

In the early 1880s, she nursed her aging parents. Her mother died in December 1881 but, from August 1882, she also cared for her young nephew Jean Longuet for several months, easing the burden on her elder sister, Jenny Longuet, who died in January 1883 of bladder cancer. Her father died two months later, in March 1883. After that, Eleanor and Edward Aveling, overseen by Friedrich Engels, prepared the first English language edition of Das Kapital volume I, published in 1887. On Engels' death in 1895, she and Aveling sorted and stored her father's extensive papers.

Marx identified strongly with her Jewish heritage. In a reversal of her paternal grandparents' abandonment of Judaism and conversion to Christianity, she proudly declared: "I am a Jewess". Her interest in her Jewish heritage was sparked by her interactions with working-class Jewish sweatshop workers involved in social justice struggles in the East End of London, and also by the Dreyfus affair in France. Her earliest Jewish engagement was in October 1890, when she attended a meeting of a group of Jewish socialist workers in London in order to protest against antisemitic persecution in Czarist Russia. She learned Yiddish and sometimes delivered lectures in the language.

=== Career ===
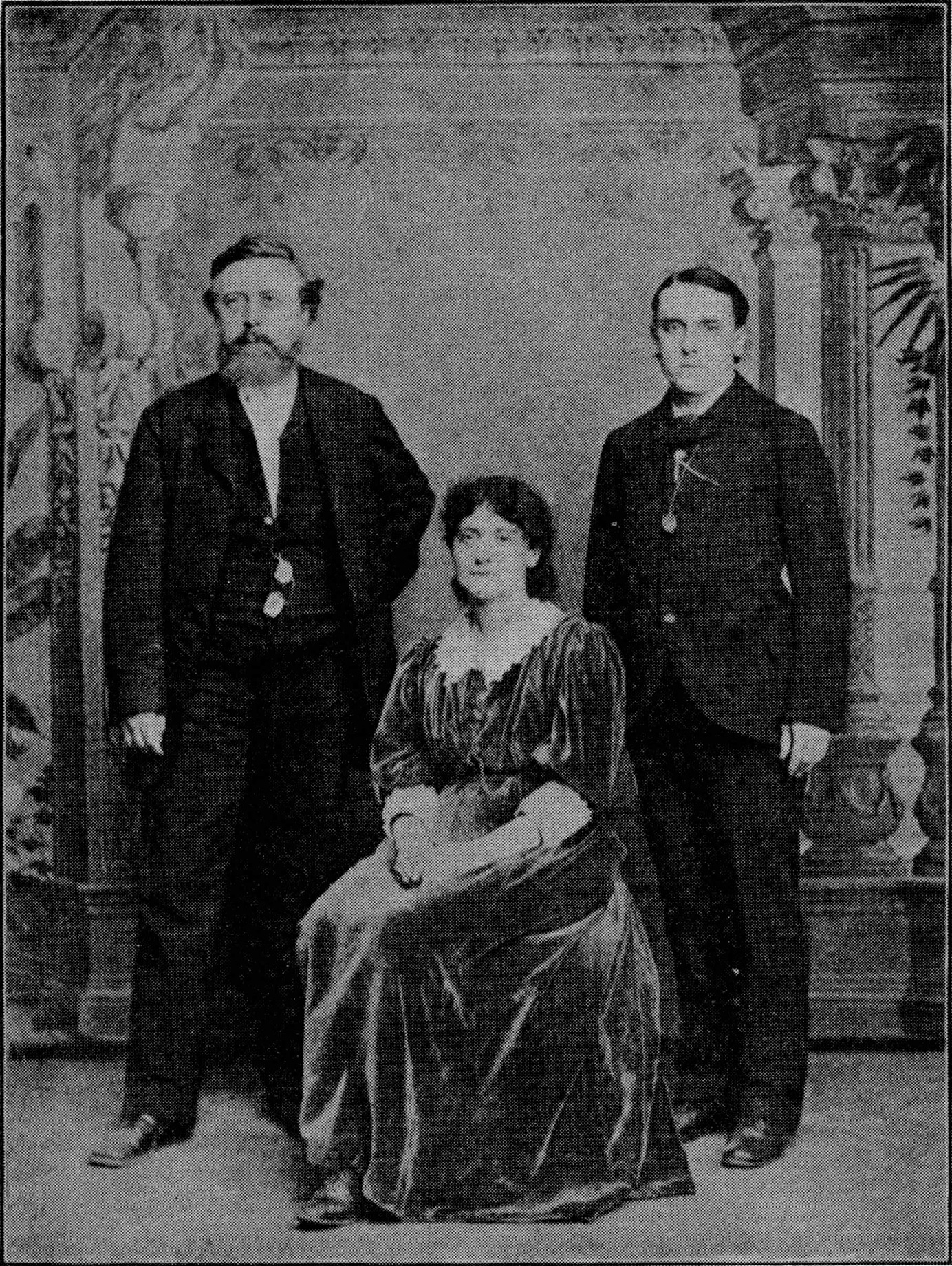
Eleanor Marx (middle) with Wilhelm Liebknecht (left) and Edward Aveling (right) photographed in New York during their tour to America in 1886

In 1884, Eleanor joined the Social Democratic Federation (SDF), led by Henry Hyndman, and was elected to its executive. During her work in the SDF, she met Edward Aveling, with whom she would spend the rest of her life, despite his faithlessness, alleged thievery from the movement, and mental cruelty.

==== Socialist League ====
In 1885, after some bitter polemics, there was a split in the SDF. Eleanor Marx and some others left it and founded the rival Socialist League.

The split had two root causes: personality problems, as Hyndman was accused of leading the SDF in a dictatorial fashion, and disagreements on the issue of internationalism. At that point, Marx, among others, accused Hyndman of nationalist tendencies. He was, for example, opposed to Marx's idea of sending delegates to the French Workers' Party, calling the proposal a "family manoeuvre", given that Eleanor Marx's sister Laura and her husband Paul Lafargue were members of that party. Therefore, both Marx and Aveling became founding members of the Socialist League, the most prominent member of which was William Morris.

Other leaders of the Socialist League were Ernest Belfort Bax, Sam Mainwaring, and Tom Mann, the latter two being representatives of the working class. Annie Besant was also an active member.

Marx wrote a regular column, called "Record of the Revolutionary International Movement", for the Socialist League's monthly newspaper, Commonweal.

In 1884, Marx met Clementina Black, a painter and trade unionist, and became involved in the Women's Trade Union League. She would go on to support numerous strikes, including the Bryant & May strike of 1888 and the London Dock Strike of 1889. She spoke to the Silvertown strikers at an open meeting in November 1889, alongside her friends Edith Ellis and Honor Brooke. She helped organise the Gasworkers' Union and wrote numerous books and articles.

In 1885, she helped organise the International Socialist Congress in Paris. The following year, she toured the United States, along with Aveling and the German socialist Wilhelm Liebknecht, raising money for the Social Democratic Party of Germany.

By the late 1880s, the Socialist League was deeply divided between those advocating political action and its opponents, who were themselves split between those, such as William Morris, who felt that parliamentary campaigns represented inevitable compromises and corruptions, and an anarchist wing which opposed all electoral politics as a matter of principle. Marx and Aveling, as firm advocates of the principle of participation in political campaigns, found themselves in an uncomfortable minority in the party. At the 4th Annual Conference of the Socialist League, the Bloomsbury branch, to which Marx and Aveling belonged, moved that a meeting of all socialist bodies should be called to discuss the formation of a united organisation. That resolution was voted down by a substantial margin, as was another put forward by the same branch in support of contesting seats in both local and parliamentary elections. Moreover, at that meeting, the Socialist League suspended the 80 members of the Bloomsbury branch on the grounds that the group had put up candidates jointly with the SDF, against the policy of the party. The Bloomsbury branch thus exited the Socialist League for a new, albeit brief, independent existence as the Bloomsbury Socialist Society.

==== Bloody Sunday ====
Along with many other leading Socialists, Eleanor Marx took an active role in organizing the London demonstration of 13 November 1887, which was violently suppressed in what became known as Bloody Sunday. Several other demonstrations followed in the aftermath, with Eleanor urging the radical line. In the aftermath of Bloody Sunday, Marx wrote a report on the brutal treatment of women activists and protesters at the hands of police, decrying their actions in targeting women.

In 1893, Keir Hardie founded the Independent Labour Party (ILP). Marx attended the founding conference as an observer, while Aveling was a delegate. Their goal of shifting the ILP's positions towards Marxism failed, however, and the party remained under a strong Christian socialist influence. In 1897, Marx and Aveling re-joined the Social Democratic Federation, like most former members of the Socialist League.

==== Translation work ====
After acquiring admission to the Reading Room of the British Museum, Eleanor first began work as a paid translator during the late 1870s. She spent many days there, researching information and working on her translations. In the late 1880s, she accomplished the first English translation of Gustave Flaubert's Madame Bovary. Additionally, Eleanor translated Reuben Sachs, by Amy Levy, into German. Eleanor was involved as a translator or editor in 14 known works.

=== Involvement in theatre ===
In the 1880s, Eleanor Marx became more interested in theatre and took up acting, believing in its potential for promulgating socialism. In 1886, she performed a groundbreaking, if critically unsuccessful, reading of Henrik Ibsen's A Doll's House in London, with herself as Nora Helmer, Aveling as Torvald Helmer, and George Bernard Shaw as Krogstad.

She learned Norwegian in order to translate Ibsen's plays into English and, in 1888, was the first to translate An Enemy of Society. Two years later, the translation was revised by William Archer and renamed An Enemy of the People. Marx also translated Ibsen's The Lady from the Sea in 1890.

=== Death and legacy ===
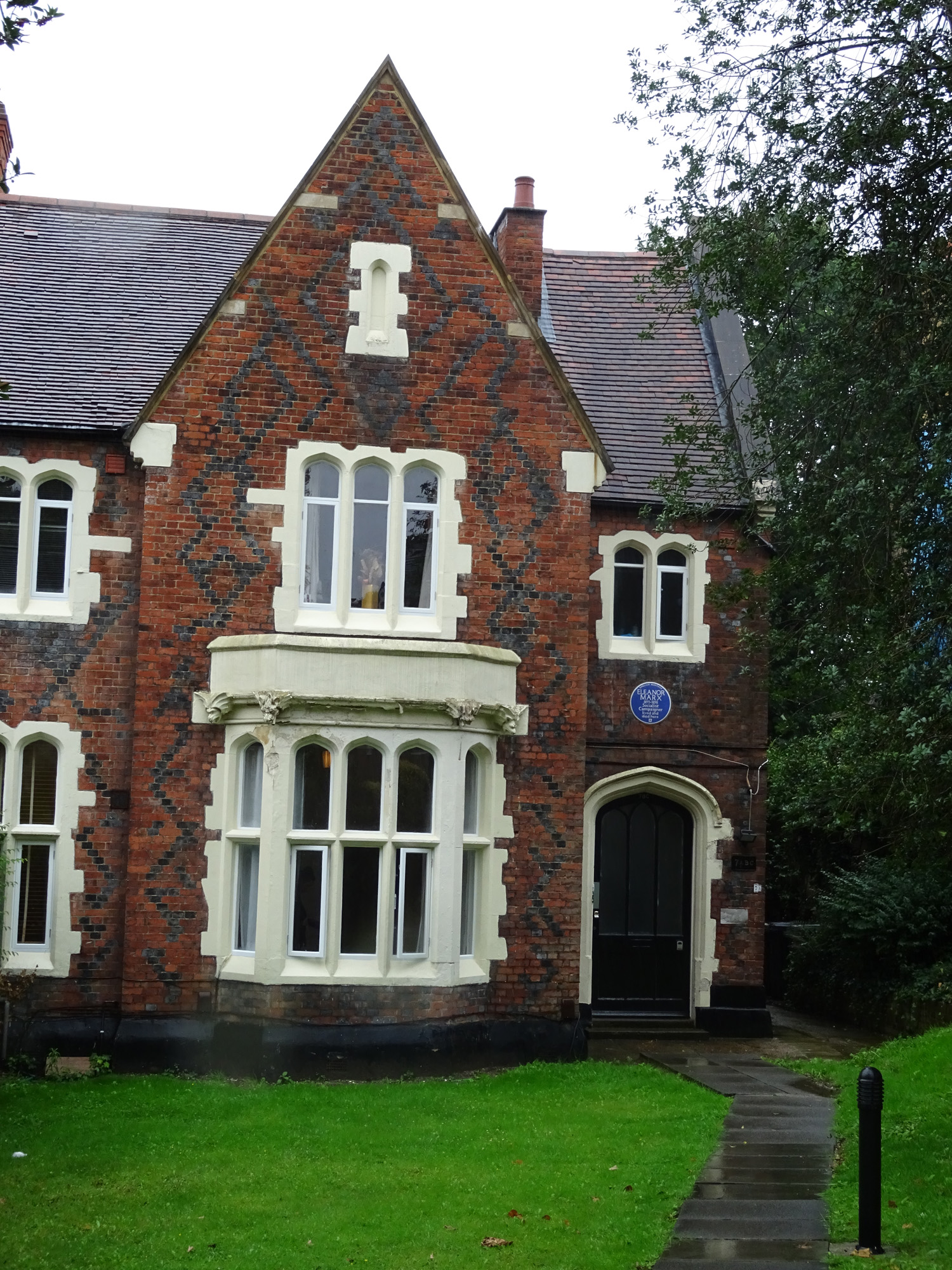
Marx's final home at 7 Jews Walk, Sydenham, London

In 1898, Eleanor discovered that the ailing Edward Aveling had secretly married a young actress, to whom he remained committed. His illness seemed to her to be terminal, and Eleanor was deeply depressed by the faithlessness of the man she loved.

On 31 March 1898, Eleanor sent her maid to the local chemist with a note on which she signed the initials of the man the chemist knew as "Dr. Aveling", asking for chloroform (some sources say "padiorium") and a small quantity of hydrogen cyanide (then called "prussic acid") for her dog. On receiving the package, Eleanor signed a receipt for the poisons and sent the maid back to the chemist to return the receipt book. Eleanor then retired to her room, wrote two brief suicide notes, undressed, got into bed, and swallowed the poison.

When the maid returned, she discovered Eleanor in bed, scarcely breathing. A doctor was called for, but Eleanor had died by the time he arrived. She was aged 43. A post mortem examination determined the cause of death to have been poison, and a subsequent coroner's inquest delivered a verdict of "suicide while in a state of temporary insanity", clearing Aveling of criminal wrongdoing. However, he was widely reviled throughout the socialist community as having caused Eleanor to take her life.

A funeral service was held in a room at the London Necropolis railway station at Waterloo on 5 April 1898, attended by a large throng of mourners. Speeches were made by Aveling, Robert Banner, Eduard Bernstein, Pete Curran, Henry Hyndman and Will Thorne. Following the memorial, Eleanor Marx's body was taken by rail to Woking and cremated. An urn containing her ashes was subsequently kept safe by a succession of left-wing organisations, including the Social Democratic Federation, the British Socialist Party, and the Communist Party of Great Britain, before finally being buried alongside the remains of Karl Marx and other family members in the tomb of Karl Marx at Highgate Cemetery in London in 1956.

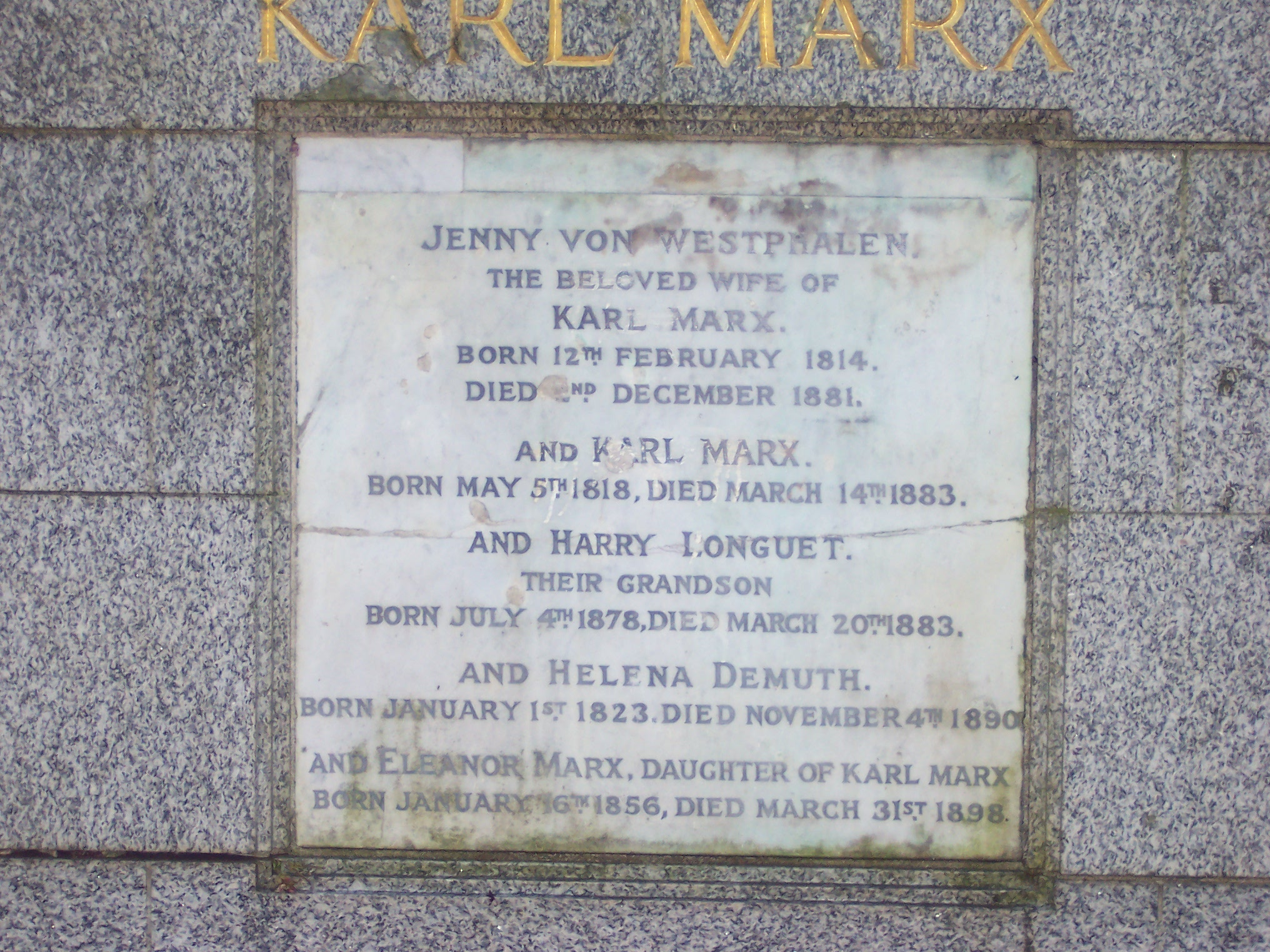
The headstone at the tomb of Karl Marx in Highgate Cemetery

On 9 September 2008, an English Heritage blue plaque was placed on the house at 7 Jews Walk, Sydenham, south-east London, where Eleanor spent the last few years of her life.

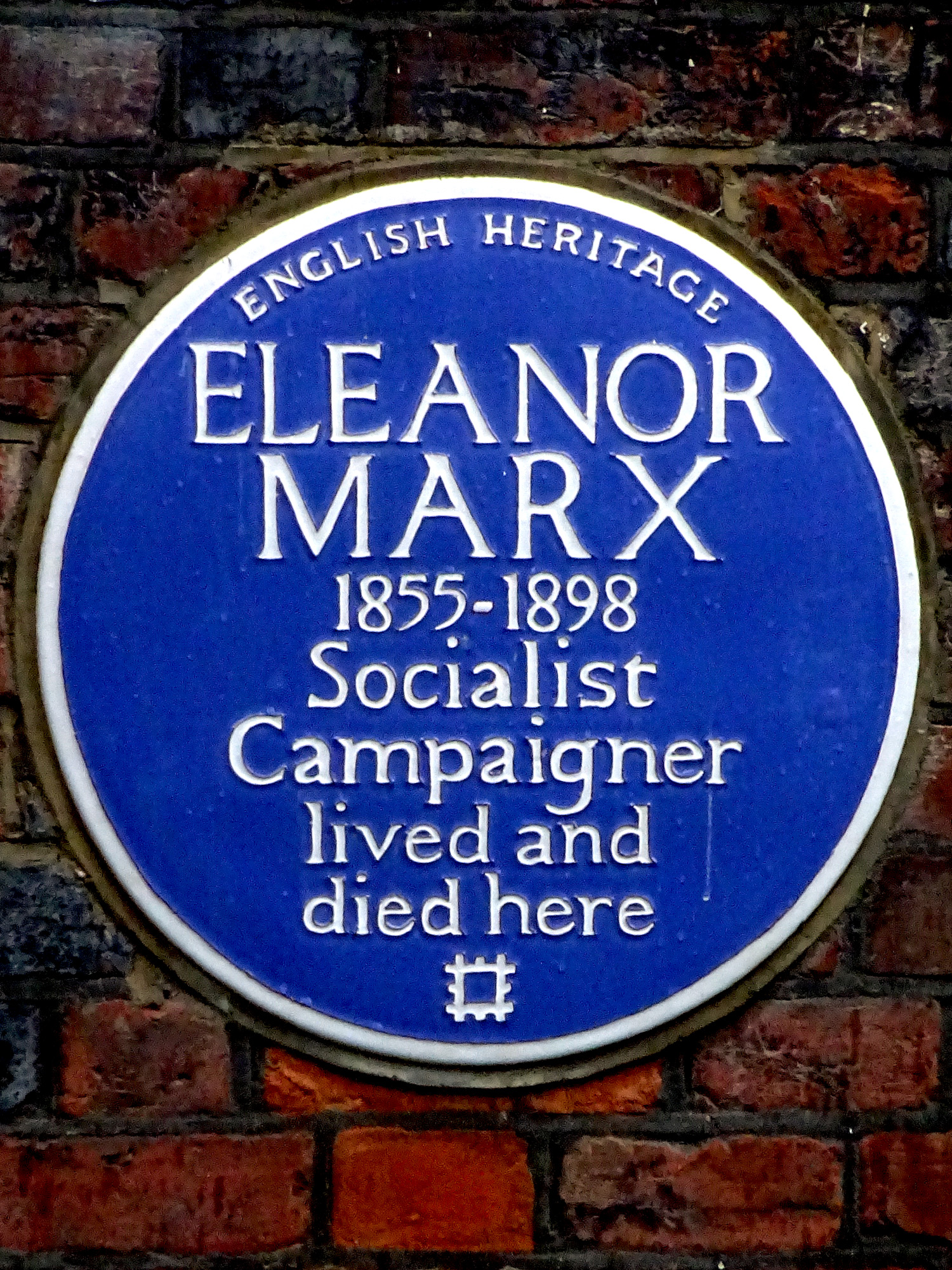
Close up of blue plaque on the wall of 7 Jews Walk, Sydenham, London

== Publications by Eleanor Marx ==
=== Writings ===
- The Factory Hell. With Edward Aveling. London: Socialist League Office, 1885.
- The Woman Question. With Edward Aveling. London: Swan Sonnenschein & Co., 1886.
- Shelley's Socialism: Two Lectures. With Edward Aveling. London: privately printed, 1888.
- Israel Zangwill / Eleanor Marx: "A doll's house" repaired. London (Reprinted from: Time, March 1891).
- The Working Class Movement in America. With Edward Aveling. London: Swan Sonnenschein & Co., 1891.
- The Working Class Movement in England: A Brief Historical Sketch Originally Written for the "Voles lexicon" Edited by Emmanuel Wurm. London: Twentieth Century Press, 1896.

=== Translations ===
- Edward Bernstein, Ferdinand Lassalle as a Social Reformer. London: Swan Sonnenschein & Co. 1893.
- George Plechanoff, Anarchism and Socialism. Twentieth Century Press, London 1895
- Gustave Flaubert, Madame Bovary: Provincial Manners. Vizetelly & Co., London 1886
- Gustave Flaubert, Salammbô. London 1862
- Henrik Ibsen, An Enemy of the People. Walter Scott Publishing Co., London 1888
- Henrik Ibsen, The Lady from the Sea. Fisher T. Unwin, London 1890
- Henrik Ibsen, The Pillars of Society and Other Plays. London: W. Scott, 1888.
- Henrik Ibsen, The Wild Duck: A Drama in Five Acts. W.H. Baker, Boston 1890
- Prosper-Olivier Lissagaray, History of the Commune of 1871. Reeves / Turner, London 1886

== Representation in film and television ==
- In 1977, BBC Television broadcast a three part series Eleanor Marx, with Jennie Stoller as Eleanor, Nigel Hawthorne as Engels, Patsy Byrne as Lenchen, Lee Montague as Karl Marx.
- Her life was portrayed in the feature film Miss Marx (2020) written and directed by Susanna Nicchiarelli.
