= Henry Juta =

South African judge

The Honourable Sir Henry Herbert Juta KC
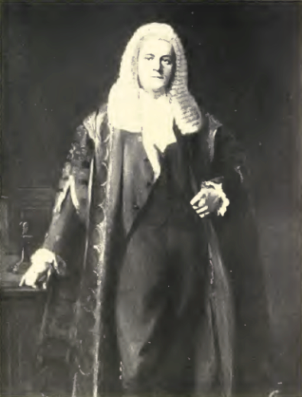

Judge of the Appellate Division of South Africa
- In office 1920–1923
- Prime Minister: Jan Smuts

Judge President of the Cape Provincial Division
- In office 1914–1920
- Preceded by: Christian Maasdorp
- Succeeded by: Sir John Gilbert Kotzé

Speaker of the Cape House of Assembly
- In office 1896–1898
- Prime Minister: Gordon Sprigg
- Preceded by: Sir David Tennant
- Succeeded by: Sir Bisset Berry

Personal details
- Born: 12 August 1857 Cape Town, Cape Colony
- Died: 16 May 1930 (aged 72) Battle, Sussex, England
- Spouse: Helen Lena Tait (m. 1883)
- Children: 5
- Parent(s): Jan Carel Juta; Louise Marx
- Relatives: Karl Marx (uncle); Heinrich Marx (grandfather); Henriette Pressburg (grandmother); Laura Marx (cousin); Eleanor Marx (cousin); Jenny Longuet (cousin); Anton Philips (second cousin); Gerard Philips (second cousin)

Sir Henry Herbert Juta (12 August 1857 – 16 May 1930) was a South African judge who served as Speaker of the Cape House of Assembly, Judge President of the Cape Provincial Division and judge of the South African Appellate Division.

== Early life and education ==
Juta attended the South African College in Cape Town from 1868 to 1874, where he matriculated with distinction. He obtained a BA degree in 1876 and then went to the University of London, gaining a LLB with honours. He became a member of the Inner Temple in January 1880.

== Career ==
Juta returned to Cape Town and was admitted to the bar on 14 September 1880. He had a busy practice and also served as an examiner for the University of the Cape of Good Hope. In 1892 he served as an acting judge in Griqualand West and in 1893 he entered politics.

He served as MLA for Oudtshoorn from 1893 to 1898, and briefly in 1894, as Attorney General for the second government of Prime Minister Cecil Rhodes. He also took silk in 1893 and in 1896 became speaker of the legislative assembly. He was knighted in the 1897 Diamond Jubilee Honours. In 1899 he became MLA for Port Elizabeth, a constituency he represented until 1907.

In late 1902 he visited the United Kingdom with his family. Juta was appointed Judge President of the Cape Provincial Division in September 1914 and in 1920 he was appointed Judge of the Appeal Court. He resigned in 1923 and settled with his wife in Europe.

== Family ==
Juta was born in South Africa to Jan Carel Juta and Louise Marx and baptised into the Dutch Reformed Church. He was a nephew of Karl Marx. His parents together founded the publishing house Juta and Company.

In 1883, he married Helen Lena Tait and they had four daughters and one son. The eldest daughter, Helen (1886–1952), married the English composer John David Davis in 1919 and their son Jan married Alice Ford Huntington, daughter of American tennis player Bob Huntington and sister of Helen Dinsmore Huntington of the Huntington family.
