= Laura Marx =

Daughter of Karl Marx (1845–1911)

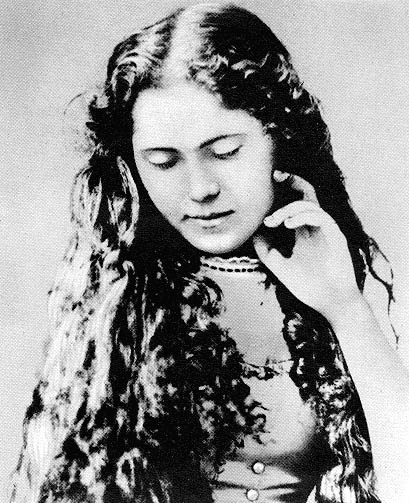
- Marx in 1860
- Born: Jenny Laura Marx; 26 September 1845; Brussels, Belgium
- Died: 25 November 1911 (aged 66); Paris, France
- Cause of death: Suicide
- Resting place: Père Lachaise Cemetery
- Spouse: Paul Lafargue (m. 1868)
- Children: 3; all died in infancy
- Parents: Karl Marx (father); Jenny von Westphalen (mother)
- Relatives: Eleanor Marx (sister); Jenny Longuet (sister); Henry Juta (cousin); Louise Juta (aunt); Heinrich Marx (grandfather); Henriette Pressburg (grandmother); Anton Philips (second cousin); Gerard Philips (second cousin)

Laura Marx (26 September 1845 – 25 November 1911) was a socialist activist. The second daughter of Karl Marx and Jenny von Westphalen, she married revolutionary writer Paul Lafargue in 1868. The two died by suicide together in 1911.

== Life ==
Jenny Laura Marx was born in Brussels and moved with her parents to France, then Prussia, before the family settled in London in June 1849. Paul Lafargue, born in Santiago de Cuba, was a young French socialist who came to London in 1866 to work for the First International. There he became a friend of Karl Marx and got to know Marx's family, especially Laura, who fell in love with him.

Lafargue and Laura married at St Pancras registry office in April 1868. During their first three years of marriage they had three children, two boys and a girl, all of whom died in infancy. They had no other children. They spent several decades in political work together, translating Karl Marx's work into French, and spreading Marxism both in France and Spain. During most of their lives, they were financially supported by Friedrich Engels. They also inherited much of Engels' estate when he died in 1895.

On 25 November 1911, the couple ended their lives through suicide, having decided they had nothing left to give to the movement to which they had devoted their lives. Laura was 66 and Paul was 69. In their suicide letter, they explained why they died by suicide. Lafargue wrote:

Healthy in body and mind, I end my life before pitiless old age which has taken from me my pleasures and joys one after another; and which has been stripping me of my physical and mental powers, can paralyse my energy and break my will, making me a burden to myself and to others.

For some years I had promised myself not to live beyond 70; and I fixed the exact year for my departure from life. I prepared the method for the execution of our resolution, it was a hypodermic of cyanide acid.

I die with the supreme joy of knowing that at some future time, the cause to which I have been devoted for forty-five years will triumph.

Long live Communism! Long Live the international socialism!

Vladimir Lenin, who had lived in Paris and other countries since his 1907 exile, was one of the speakers at the funeral as representative of RSDLP. He later told his wife Nadezhda Krupskaya, "If one cannot work for the Party any longer, one must be able to look truth in the face and die like the Lafargues."

== Ancestry ==
Ancestors of Laura Marx

16. Schmuel Mordechai ha-Levi
8. Marx Levi Mordechai
17. Malka Spira
4. Heinrich Marx
18. Moïse Lwow
9. Eva Lwow
19. Bella Eger
2. Karl Marx
20. Hirschl Michl Heymann Preßburg
10. Isaac Hijman Jitschak Preßburg
21. Heintje Isaac Kutsch
5. Henrietta Preßburg
22. Salomon David Cohen-Chazzan
11. Nanette Salomons Cohen
23. Sara Brandes
1. Laura Marx
24. Isaac Johann Christian Westphal
12. Christian Philip Heinrich von Westphalen
25. Anna Elisabeth Henneberg
6. Ludwig von Westphalen
26. George Wishart
13. Jeanie Wishart
27. Anne Campbell
3. Jenny von Westphalen
28. Johann Michael Heubel
14. Julius Christoph Heubel
29. Anna Christiane Zimmermann
7. Amalia Julia Carolina Heubel
30. Julius Ernst Wiegand Heubel
15. Sophie Friederike Heubel
31. Marie Elisabeth Alexandrine Storch

== Works ==
- Laura Lafargue / Eleanor Marx – Aveling: Briefe und Schriften von Karl Marx ... Oktober 1895. In: Die Neue Zeit, 1895, p. 121
- Karl Marx / Friedrich Engels:Manifeste du parti communiste. (Traduction de Laura Lafargue). V. Giard et E. Brière, Paris 1897
- Karl Marx (das ist Friedrich Engels):Révolution et contre-révolution en Allemagne. Trad. par Laura Lafargue. V. Giard et E. Brière, Paris 1900 (Bibliothèque socialiste internationale 6)
- Friedrich Engels:Religion, philosophie, socialisme. Trad. par Paul & Laura Lafargue. Jacques, Paris 1901 (Bibliothèque d'études socialistes 8)
- Karl Marx:Contribution à la critique de l'économie politique. Traduit sur la 2e édition allemande de Karl Kautsky par Laura Lafargue. V. Giard et E. Brière, Paris 1909 (Bibliothèque socialiste internationale 11)

== Bibliography ==
- Franz Mehring: Paul und Laura Lafargue. In: Die Neue Zeit, Stuttgart, 30. jg. 1911–1912, 1st Vol., pp. 337–343
- Friedrich Engels Paul et Laura Lafargue. Correspondance. Textes recueillis, annotés et présentés par Émile Bottigelli. Traductions de l'anglais par Paul Meier. Tome I.Édition Sociales, Paris 1956
- Friedrich Engels Paul et Laura Lafargue. Correspondance. Textes recueillis, annotés et présentés par Émile Bottigelli. Traductions de l'anglais par Paul Meier. Tome II., Édition Sociales, Paris 1956
- Friedrich Engels Paul et Laura Lafargue. Correspondance. Textes recueillis, annotés et présentés par Émile Bottigelli. Traductions de l'anglais par Paul Meier. Tome III., Édition Sociales, Paris 1959
- Olga Meier (Hrsg.): Die Töchter von Karl Marx. Unveröffentlichte Briefe. aus dem Französischen und dem Englischen von Karin Kersten und Jutta Prasse. Kiepenheuer & Witsch, Köln 1981 ISBN 3-462-01432-3
- Irina Bach / Olga Senekina: "Briefe von Mitgliedern der Familie Marx an Friedrich Engels". In: Marx-Engels-Jahrbuch 6. Dietz Verlag, Berlin 1983, pp. 311–366
- Olga Worobjowa / Irma Senelnikowa: Die Töchter von Marx 4. ed. Dietz Verlag, Berlin 1984
- Rosie Rudich: "Neue Briefe von Karl Marx und Laura Lafargue". In: Marx-Engels-Jahrbuch 8. Dietz Verlag, Berlin 1985, pp. 283–314
- Inge Werchan: "Engels begutachtete Laura Lafargues überarbeitete französische Übersetzung des "Kommunistischen Manifests" aus dem Jahre 1894". In: Beiträge zur Marx-Erngels-Forschung 24, Berlin 1988, pp. 112–116
- Katharina Raabe (Hrsg): Deutsche Schwestern. Vierzehn Porträts. Rowohlt Berlin, Berlin 1997
- Familie Marx privat. Akademie Verlag, Berlin 2005 ISBN 3-05-004118-8
- Renate Merkel-Melis: "'… that most untranslateable of documents …'. Engels' Revision der französischen Übersetzung des "Kommunistischen Manifests" von Laura Lafargue". In: Marx-Engels-Jahrbuch 2006. Akademie-Verlag, Berlin 2007
- Wheen, Francis (1999). Karl Marx. London: Fourth Estate. ISBN 1-84115-114-9. OCLC 688241941.
