= Jenny Longuet =

Karl Marx's eldest daughter

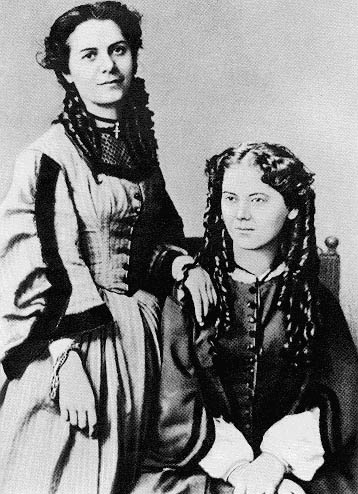
- Jenny Marx Longuet (left) and her sister, Laura Marx
- Born: Jenny Caroline Marx; 1 May 1844; Paris, Kingdom of France
- Died: 11 January 1883 (aged 38); Argenteuil, Third French Republic
- Occupation: Language teacher
- Spouse: Charles Longuet
- Children: 6 (including Jean Longuet and Edgar Longuet)
- Parents: Karl Marx (father); Jenny von Westphalen (mother)
- Relatives: Laura Marx (sister); Eleanor Marx (sister); Henry Juta (cousin); Louise Juta (aunt); Heinrich Marx (grandfather); Henriette Pressburg (grandmother); Anton Philips (second cousin); Gerard Philips (second cousin)

Jenny Caroline Marx Longuet (French: [ʒeni lɔ̃ɡɛ]; 1 May 1844 – 11 January 1883) was the eldest daughter of Jenny von Westphalen Marx and Karl Marx. Briefly a political journalist writing under the pen name J. Williams, Longuet taught language classes and had a family of five sons and a daughter before her death to cancer at the age of 38.

== Biography ==
=== Early years ===
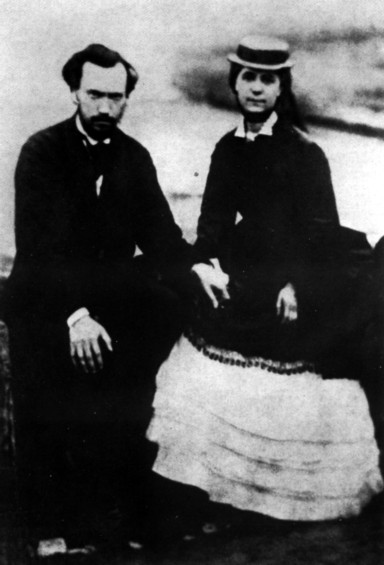
Charles and Jenny Longuet in the 1870s.

Jenny Caroline Marx, known to family and close friends as "Jennychen" to distinguish her from her mother, was born in Paris on 1 May 1844, the oldest daughter of Karl Marx and Jenny von Westphalen Marx. She was a fragile child but was nevertheless the first of the Marx children to survive childhood.

In 1868, at the age of 24, she accepted a position as a French language teacher in order to help her parents financially. She also contributed a number of articles to the socialist press, in 1870 writing under the pen name "J. Williams" on the treatment of the Irish political prisoners by the British government.

She met her future husband, the French journalist and radical political activist Charles Longuet in 1871. The pair became engaged in March 1872 and were married on 10 October the same year in a civil ceremony at St Pancras registry office, she taking the name Jenny Longuet.

As with her parents, the young couple faced economic hardship in their earliest years. They moved to Oxford soon after their marriage, hoping that Charles could find work as a teacher, but he was unable to do so. Jenny earned a meagre income for the pair working as a private tutor, giving lessons in French, German, and singing.

The couple's financial lives became more stable in 1874, when Jenny and Charles found work as teachers, with Jenny holding a position as a German teacher at the St Clement Danes School. The minimal salary she earned at the school was supplemented by giving private lessons. Her husband obtained a position teaching French at King's College, together making enough to maintain a small house in London.

Jenny Longuet was pregnant in almost every year of her married life. She gave birth to a first son in September 1873, but the child died the following summer of diarrhea. A second son, Jean Laurent Frederick "Johnny" Longuet (1876–1938) fared better, surviving to eventually become a leader of the Socialist Party of France.

A third son, born in 1878, who had a developmental disability and was sickly, died at the age of 5, while a fourth, Edgar "Wolf" Longuet (1879–1950) lived a full life, becoming a medical doctor as well as an activist in the French Socialist Party.

=== Return to France ===
A political amnesty granted by the government of France in July 1880 allowed Charles Longuet the opportunity to return to his native country and he was quick to return, taking a position as an editor of La Justice, a radical daily newspaper founded by Georges Clemenceau. By this time, however, Jenny had begun to suffer from cancer and she for a time remained in London with her three sons, to be near her aging parents.

In February 1881 Jenny and the boys moved to France to join her husband. The family settled in the town of Argenteuil, near Paris, where they were regularly visited by the boys' doting grandfather Karl Marx.

Despite her ill health, Jenny delivered another son, Marcel Longuet (1881–1949) who later worked as a journalist, including for the Parisian newspaper L'Aurore. A final child, a daughter also named Jenny Longuet, was born in September 1882 and lived until 1952.

=== Death and legacy ===
Just four months after the birth of her daughter, Longuet died at Argenteuil on 11 January 1883, at the age of 38, and was interred at Cimetière du Centre d'Argenteuil. She likely passed away from cancer of the bladder, a condition which had afflicted her for some time. Her father was too ill to attend the funeral in France; he died two months later.

Ancestors of Jenny Longuet

16. Schmuel Mordechai ha-Levi
8. Marx Levi Mordechai
17. Malka Spira
4. Heinrich Marx
18. Moïse Lwow
9. Eva Lwow
19. Bella Eger
2. Karl Marx
20. Hirschl Michl Heymann Preßburg
10. Isaac Hijman Jitschak Preßburg
21. Heintje Isaac Kutsch
5. Henrietta Preßburg
22. Salomon David Cohen-Chazzan
11. Nanette Salomons Cohen
23. Sara Brandes
1. Jenny Marx
24. Isaac Johann Christian Westphal
12. Christian Philip Heinrich von Westphalen
25. Anna Elisabeth Henneberg
6. Ludwig von Westphalen
26. George Wishart (moderator)
13. Jeanie Wishart
27. Anne Campbell
3. Jenny von Westphalen
28. Johann Michael Heubel
14. Julius Christoph Heubel
29. Anna Christiane Zimmermann
7. Amalia Julia Carolina Heubel
30. Julius Ernst Wiegand Heubel
15. Sophie Friederike Heubel
31. Marie Elisabeth Alexandrine Storch
