= Louise Juta =

Karl Marx's sister (1821–1893)

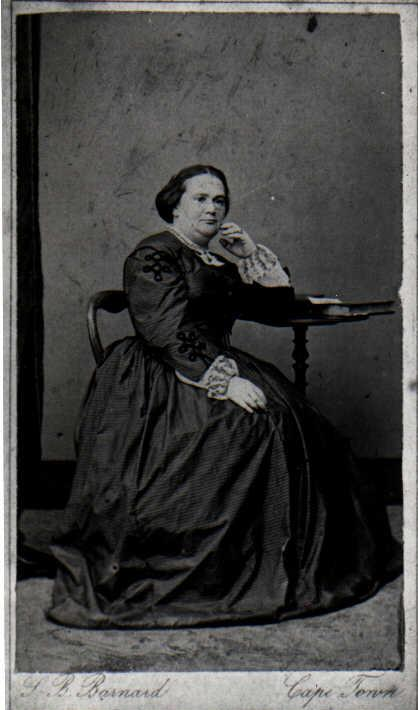
- Born: Louise Leah Marx; 14 November 1821
- Died: 3 July 1893 (aged 71); Rondebosch, Cape Colony
- Occupation: Bookseller
- Spouse: Jan Carel Juta (m. 1853)
- Children: 7, including Henry
- Parents: Heinrich Marx (father); Henriette Pressburg (mother)
- Relatives: Karl Marx (brother); Jenny Longuet (niece); Laura Marx (niece); Eleanor (niece)

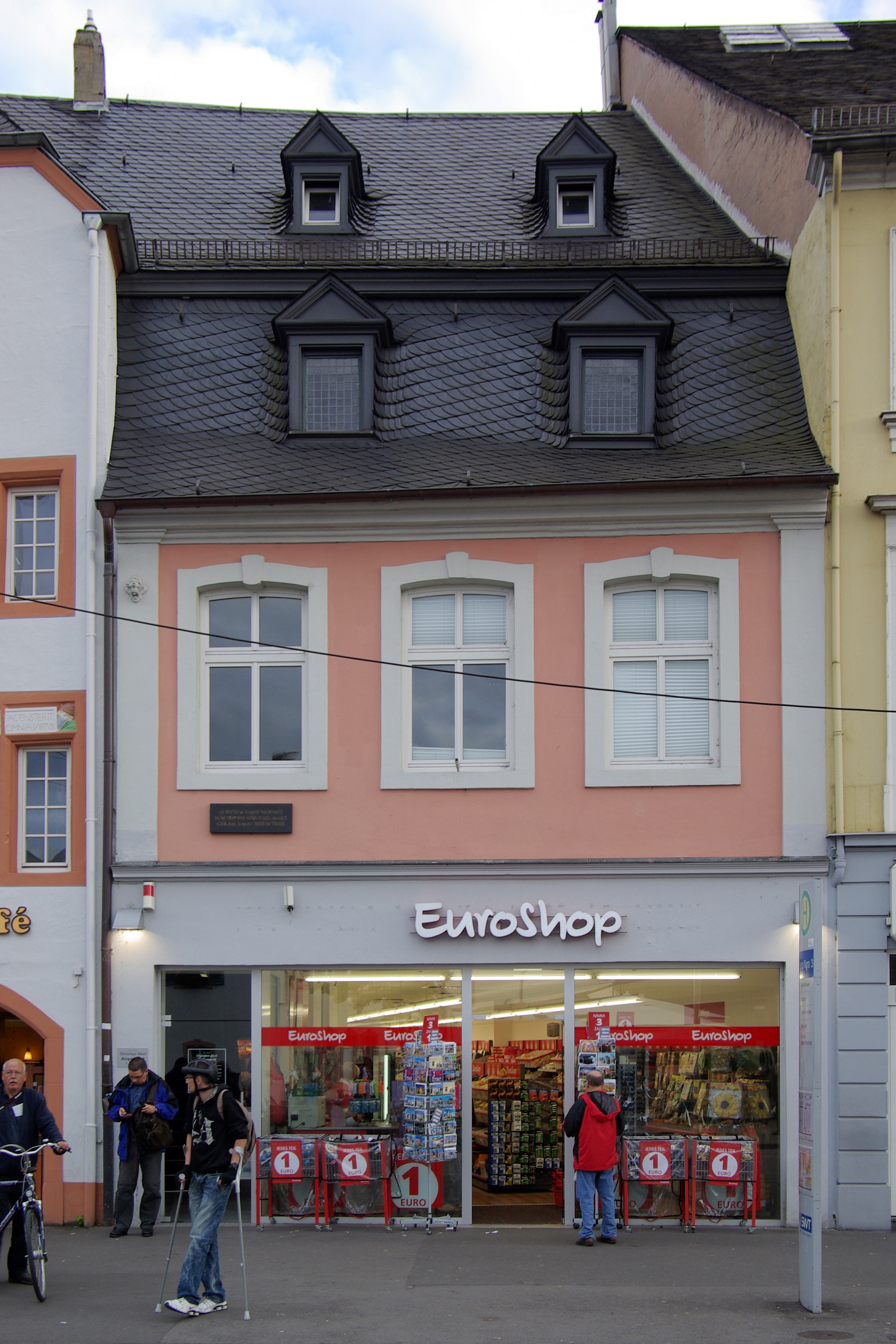
8 Simeonstrasse, Trier. Louise's birthplace and home until the family moved in 1842

Louise Leah Juta, born Louise (or Luise) Marx (14 November 1821 – 3 July 1893) was a German bookseller and the sister of communist philosopher Karl Marx.

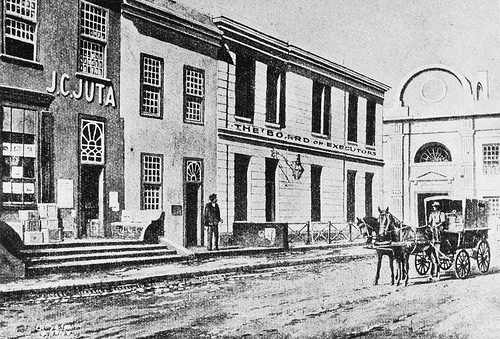
J. C. Juta, bookseller, Cape Town, circa 1860

== Life ==
Louise Marx was the sixth child of Heinrich Marx, a lawyer, and Henriette Pressburg, of Trier in the Prussian Rhineland. Growing up, her elder brother Karl was clearly the dominant child in the family. Louise's niece Eleanor Marx later recorded that Karl was “‘a unique and unrivaled storyteller. I have heard my aunts say that as a little boy he was a terrible tyrant to his sisters, whom he would ‘drive’ down the Markusberg at Trier full speed as his horses and, worse, would insist on their eating the ‘cakes’ he made with dirty dough and dirtier hands. But they stood the ‘driving’ and ate the ‘cakes’ without a murmur for the sake of the stories Karl would tell them as a reward for their virtue.”

Heinrich, a Jew and the son of a rabbi, was baptized in about 1817. With her siblings, Louise was baptized on 26 August 1824 by the Protestant military pastor Mühlenhoff. Shortly after a bout of scarlet fever, she was summoned with her sister Emilie on April 8, 1838 to Trier, because her father was seriously ill with tuberculosis. Heinrich Marx died on 10 May 1838 in Trier. She received, like all underage siblings, a guardian. Therefore, not much could be invested in their education. She was given special consideration in her mother's various wills.

She met Jan Carel Juta in Zaltbommel and they married on 5 June 1853 in a civil ceremony in Trier. On the 7 June a church wedding took place in Traben, in the presence of her mother Henriette Marx and her uncle Lion and aunt Sophie Philips. On 15 June 1853, a notarised contract was concluded in Zaltbommel, in order to regulate the difficult travel conditions for the long journey to South Africa.

On the way to the Cape Colony, the newly wed couple visited Karl Marx and his family in London on 29 June. Dining with him at his Dean Street home, Louise was demonstrably unsympathetic to Karl's views, a fellow guest noting that “she could not countenance her brother being the leader of the socialists, and insisted in my presence that they both belonged to the respected family of a lawyer, who had sympathy of everyone in Trier.” Later, Juta, his wife and children visited Marx and his family and Friedrich Engels in Manchester.

Soon after their arrival (in 1853) in South Africa they founded JC Juta, Bookseller and Stationer, Wale Street, Cape Town, and sold textbooks, government documents and scientific works. In 1883 she sold part of the company to her authorized signatories Jacobus Cuypers and Thomas Mullins Duncan. She died in Rondebosch, Cape Town in 1893.

Louise and Jan Carel had seven children, including the future Sir Henry Juta QC, a barrister and senior Judge in the South African courts, who also served as Speaker of the Parliament of Cape Colony.

Juta Publishing is still trading, and is one of South Africa's leading academic and law publishers.

== Literature ==
- SA Rochlin: A link between Karl Marx and Cape Town. In: Africana Notes and News. Vol. II. Johannesburg 1944, pp. 23–24
- Juta & Company. A note on Juta's history in Cape Town. Cape Town o. J.
- Werner Blumenberg : An Unknown Chapter from Marx's Life. Letters to the Dutch relatives. In: International Review of Social History, 1, 1956, No. 1, pp. 54–111
- SA Rochlin: JC Juta, bookseller and publisher. In: Africana Notes and News. Johannesburg 1957, pp. 222–228
- Mohr and General. Berlin 1964, p. 272 f.
- Heinz Monz: Karl Marx and Trier. Relationships relationships influences. New publishing house, Trier 1964
- Heinz Monz: Karl Marx. Basics of life and work. NCO-Verlag, Trier 1973, pp. 235–236
- Olga Meier (ed.): The Daughters of Karl Marx. Unpublished letters. From French and English by Karin Kersten and Jutta Prasse. Kiepenheuer & Witsch, Cologne 1981 ISBN 3462014323
- Manfred Schoenecke: An unexpected inheritance. In: Yearbook of the IMSF 12th International Marx-Engels-Research, Frankfurt / M. 1987, p. 181 ff.
- Juta Publishing into the Nineties. 1853–1990. 137 Years of publishing. Cape Town 1990
- Manfred Schoenecke: Karl and Heinrich Marx and their siblings. Cologne 1993, pp. 590–726 ISBN 3891441851
- Jan Gielkens: Karl Marx and his Dutch relatives. An annotated source edition, Trier 1999 [rather April 2000] (= writings from the Karl Marx house 50) ISBN 3860778455
- Family Marx private. The photo and questionnaire albums of Marx's daughters Laura and Jenny. An annotated facsimile edition. Ed. V. Izumi Omura, Valery Fomičev, Rolf Hecker and Shun-ichi Kubo. With an essay by *Iring Fetscher, Akademie-Verlag, Berlin 2005 ISBN 3050041188
- David McLellan: Karl Marx: A Biography. Macmillan, London. 1973/1995. ISBN 9780333639474
- Francis Wheen: Karl Marx. Published by Fourth Estate, London. 1999. ISBN 9781841151144
