= Frederik Philips =

Dutch-Jewish industrialist and banker (1830–1900)

Benjamin Frederik David Philips (Zaltbommel, 1 December 1830 – 12 June 1900) was a Dutch-Jewish industrialist and banker who, together with his son Gerard Philips, stood at the cradle of what would eventually be called Koninklijke Philips Electronics N.V. He was also the cousin of Karl Marx on his mother's side.

== Life ==
Frederik Philips was born in 1830 as the fourth son of Lion Philips, of the prominent Jewish Philips family, and Sophie Pressburg, sister of Henriette Pressburg and daughter of Nanette Salomons Cohen. His family then made a living from the tobacco trade and would later convert from Judaism to Calvinism. Frederik married Maria Elizabeth Heijligers, a Dutch woman born in Batavia, today Jakarta, then a Dutch colony. They had two daughters and seven sons, including Gerard and Anton Philips.

From 1891 to 1898, Frederik Philips was in charge of Philips & Co as a moneylender. His son Gerard was promoted in 1898 from procurator to co-partner. Frederik Philips died in 1900 in his native Zaltbommel at the age of 69.
