= National Society of Mural Painters =

National Society of Mural Painters (NSMP)
- Abbreviation: NSMP
- Predecessor: The Mural Painters
- Formation: 1895
- Type: Nonprofit organization
- Legal status: Active
- Purpose: To advance the techniques and standards for the design and execution of mural art for the enrichment of architecture in the United States.
- Location: United States
- Origins: Beaux-Arts architecture in the United States
- Region served: United States
- Services: Exhibitions, competitions
- Fields: Mural art
- Official language: English
- Affiliations: Fine Arts Federation of New York

The National Society of Mural Painters (NSMP) is an American artists' organization originally known as The Mural Painters. The charter of the society is to advance the techniques and standards for the design and execution of mural art for the enrichment of architecture in the United States.

== Background ==
The NSMP was founded in 1895, in an era of Beaux-Arts architecture in the United States, a time when public architecture was integrated with murals, sculpture, mosaics and other artwork, coordinated and themed to assert the identity of the building. Parallel organizations associated with the same principles of integrated public art include the National Sculpture Society, which originally included a large percentage of architectural sculptors, and the Beaux-Arts Institute of Design, founded in 1916 as the teaching wing of the Society of Beaux-Arts Architects.

Still in existence after more than a hundred years, the society presents exhibitions and organizes competitions. The NSMP is a member of the Fine Arts Federation of New York.

== Presidents of the Society ==
- Frederic Crowninshield 1895-1899
- John La Farge 1899-1904
- Charles Yardley Turner 1904-1909
- Edwin Blashfield 1909-1914
- John White Alexander 1914-1915
- Kenyon Cox 1915-1919
- George W. Breck 1919-1920
- J. Monroe Hewlett 1921-1926
- Arthur Covey 1926-1929
- Ernest Peixotto 1929-1935
- George Biddle 1935-1936
- Hildreth Meiere 1936-1937
- J. Scott Williams 1937-1938
- Geoffrey Norman 1939-1940
- Francine Baehr 1940-1941
- Griffith Bailey Coale 1941-1942
- Allyn Cox 1942-1946
- Hildreth Meiere 1946-1949
- Jan Juta 1949-1952
- Austin M. Purves, Jr. 1952-1953
- Dean Cornwell 1953-1957
- Charles Baskerville 1957-1960
- Allyn Cox 1960-1963
- Helen Treadwell 1963-1967
- Xavier Gonzales 1967-1969
- Max Spivak 1969-1970
- Edward Laning 1970-1974
- Buell Mullen 1974-1975
- Jan Juta 1975-1979
- Dean Fausett 1979-1984
- Alton S. Tobey 1984-1988
- Everett Molinari 1988-1991
- Rhoda Y. Andors 1991-1995
- Frank Mason 1995-1996
- Jack Stewart 1996-2000
- Robert Harding 2001-2005
- Jeff Greene 2005

== Notable members ==
- Edith Barry
- Pietro Lazzari
