= Eleanor Marx (TV series) =

British television series

- Genre: Drama
- Written by: Andrew Davies
- Directed by: Jane Howell
- Starring: Jennie Stoller; Alan Dobie; Patsy Byrne; Nigel Hawthorne
- Country of origin: United Kingdom
- Original language: English
- No. of series: 1
- No. of episodes: 3

Production
- Producer: Louis Marks
- Running time: 210 minutes

Original release
- Network: BBC 2
- Release: 10 January – 24 January 1977

Eleanor Marx is a British television drama series which was originally broadcast in three episodes on BBC 2 from 10 January to 24 January 1977. It was inspired by the life Eleanor Marx the British socialist campaigner and youngest daughter of Karl Marx, and her complex relationship with her family and her long-term partner Edward Aveling.

== Main cast ==
- Jennie Stoller as Eleanor 'Tussy' Marx
- Alan Dobie as Dr. Edward Aveling
- Patsy Byrne as Lenchen
- Nigel Hawthorne as Engels
- David Daker as Will Thorne
- Doreen Mantle as Frau Marx
- Lee Montague as Karl Marx
- Tina Marian as Mary Ellen
- Philip Joseph as Freddy Demuth
- Alan Dudley as Solicitor/Coroner
- Gideon Kolb as Spy
- Roger Hume as Charles Bradlaugh
- Ann Windsor as Annie Besant

== Bibliography ==
- Baskin, Ellen. Serials on British Television, 1950-1994. Scolar Press, 1996.
- Holmes, Rachel. Eleanor Marx: A Life. Bloomsbury, 2014.
