= Sea and Sardinia =

1921 travel book by D. H. Lawrence

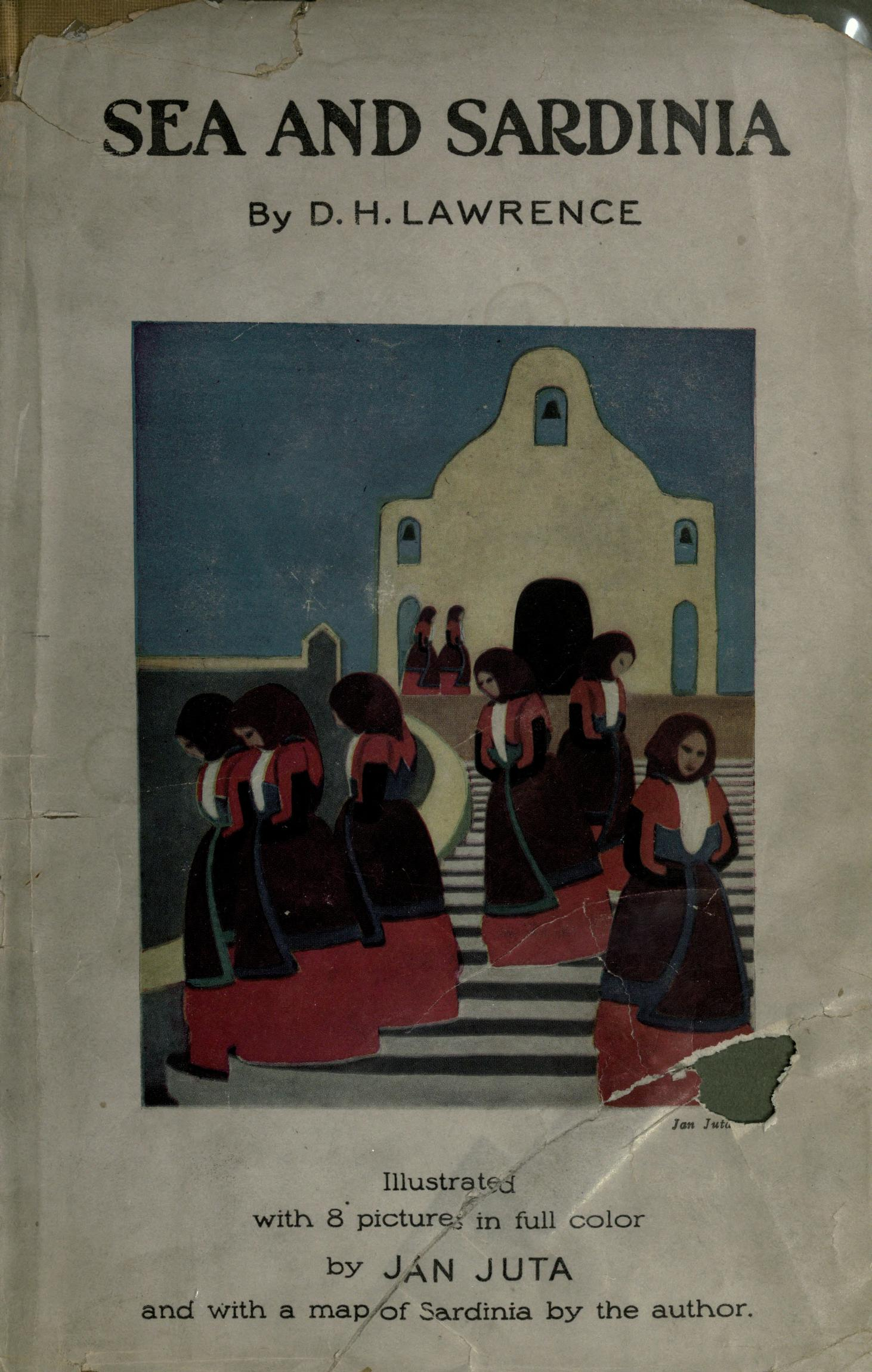
- First edition cover
- Author: D. H. Lawrence
- Language: English
- Genre: Travel book
- Publication date: 1921

Sea and Sardinia is a travel book by the English writer D. H. Lawrence. It describes a brief excursion undertaken in January 1921 by Lawrence and his wife Frieda, a.k.a. Queen Bee, from Taormina in Sicily to the interior of Sardinia. They visited Cagliari, Mandas, Sorgono, and Nuoro. His visit to Nuoro was a kind of homage to Grazia Deledda but involved no personal encounter. Despite the brevity of his visit, Lawrence distils an essence of the island and its people that is still recognisable today. Extracts were originally printed in The Dial during October and November 1921 and the book was first published in New York, USA in 1921 by Thomas Seltzer, with illustrations by Jan Juta. A British edition, published by Martin Secker, came out in April 1923.

== Standard edition ==
88-87636-47-8

- Sea and Sardinia (1921), edited by Mara Kalnins, Cambridge University Press, 1997 ISBN 0-521-24275-4.
- Sea and Sardinia (1921), edited by Jon Clarke (Publisher & Editor), The Olive Press, London, 1989 ISBN 0-946889-20-1.
- Italian edition: Mare e Sardegna, Lawrence, D. H.; Marrocu, Luciano (2000). Mare e Sardegna. Nuoro: Ilisso. ISBN 978-88-87825-17-6. OCLC 45852124.
- Online version with illustrations online-literature.com
