= John David Davis =

English musician and composer (1867–1942)

John David Davis (22 October 1867 – 20 November 1942), often known as J D Davis, was an English composer, born in Edgbaston, near Birmingham.

== Career ==
Although born into a musical family, Davis was sent to Frankfurt to train for an intended commercial career, but instead began studying music under Hans von Bulow. Davis completed his education in Germany a decade ahead of the more famous Frankfurt Group of English-speaking composers, who studied with Iwan Knorr at the Hoch Conservatory in the late 1890s. He later continued his music studies in Brussels under Léopold Wallner, Arthur De Greef and Maurice Kufferath.

He returned to Birmingham in 1889 to teach, and from 1893 to 1904 taught music at the Birmingham and Midland Institute (most of that in the pre Granville Bantock era). From 1905 he was a professor of harmony and composition at the Guildhall School of Music and was also Professor of Solfège at the International Conservatoire in London.

== Personal life ==
Davis married Helen Winifred Juta (born 1886), daughter of the South African judge Henry Juta, in 1919. They lived at 26 Trebovir Road, Earls Court until 1936, when they sailed for Lisbon. He died in Estoril, Portugal six years later, aged 75, survived by his wife. She returned to South Africa where she died in 1952.

== Music ==
As a composer, Davis has mostly been forgotten today. His one act Russian opera The Zaporogues (based on Taras Bulba) was premiered at the Theatre Royale in Birmingham with amateur performers on 7 May 1895, receiving mixed reviews. It was staged professionally in Antwerp in 1903 using a Flemish translation. In 1919 a newly orchestrated Prelude based on the work was performed in Birmingham.

There were also substantial orchestral scores, including an early Legend: Hero and Leander for bass solo and orchestra, the Coronation March (1902), Variations and Finale (1905), the suite Miniatures (performed at The Proms in 1905) and a symphonic ballad The Cenci. A number of his orchestral works were heard in Bournemouth under Dan Godfrey. His Cello Concerto, Op. 73, premiered in Bournemouth by his friend the Dutch soloist Jacques van Lier in 1921, was highly regarded at the time but soon overshadowed by Elgar's near contemporary Cello Concerto. There were further performances in Cheltenham and Berlin in 1922, and a London performance in 1924.

The 1910 symphonic poem The Maid of Astolat (after Tennyson) gained more lasting popularity and was broadcast by the BBC in 1933. The Birmingham Philharmonic String Orchestra performed and broadcast several of his works, including the three movement Petite Suite Symphonique in 1936.

Davis composed two string quartets, a string quintet and other chamber music, including Some variations on the Londonderry air, Op. 43 (1910) for string quartet. The latter was extracted from the Suite on Londonderry Air (1908), a collaborative commission from the Hambourg String Quartet with separate movements composed by Davis, York Bowen, Frank Bridge, Eric Coates and Hamilton Harty. It was first performed by the Quartet at the Aeolian Hall the same year. There were also violin and cello sonatas, a Scherzo Symphonique, Op. 58 (1917) for cello and piano, solo piano pieces (including a sonata), the Fantasia and Fugue for organ, Op. 45 (1911), and part-songs.

His 1916 Idyl for string quartet (sub-titled Summer's Eve at Cookham Lock), Op. 50, was originally written for the London String Quartet and dedicated to its members: Albert Sammons, Thomas Petrie, Harry Waldo Warner and Warwick Evans. There is a modern recording by the Tippett Quartet.
