= Jan Carel Juta =

Dutch-South African publisher and bookseller

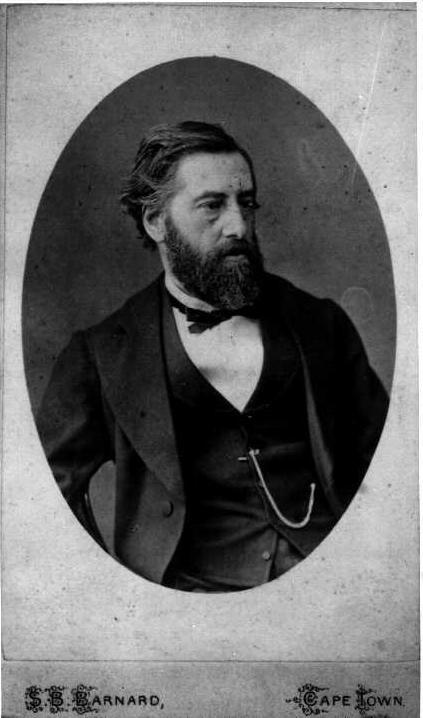
- Photograph taken of Jan Carel Juta in 1863
- Born: 23 March 1824; Zaltbommel, Netherlands
- Died: 7 April 1886; Chiswick, London
- Occupations: Publisher, bookseller
- Spouse: Louise Juta (m. 1853)
- Children: 7, including Henry
- Parent(s): Hubertus Johannes Juta; Marie Albertine Offers
- Relatives: Karl Marx (brother-in-law)

Jan Carel Juta (23 March 1824 – 7 April 1886) was a Dutch-South African publisher, bookseller and brother-in-law of Karl Marx.

He was born in Zaltbommel, Netherlands. He married his wife Louise Juta on 5 June 1853 in a civil ceremony in Trier, Germany.

Jan Carel and Louise had seven children, including the future Sir Henry Juta QC, a barrister and senior Judge in the South African courts, who also served as Speaker of the Parliament of Cape Colony.

Juta died on 7 April 1886 in Chiswick, London.

Juta Publishing is still trading, and is one of South Africa's leading academic and law publishers.
