= Henriette Pressburg =

Mother of Karl Marx (1788–1863)

- Born: 20 September 1788; Nijmegen, Netherlands
- Died: 30 November 1863 (aged 75); Trier, Prussian Rhineland
- Known for: Mother of Karl Marx
- Spouse: Heinrich Marx (m. 1814; died 1838)
- Children: 8 (including Karl Marx and Louise Juta)
- Parents: Isaac Heymans Pressburg (father); Nanette Salomons Cohen (mother)
- Relatives: Levy Barent Cohen (uncle); Laura Marx (granddaughter); Eleanor Marx (granddaughter); Jenny Longuet (granddaughter); Henry Juta (grandson); Lion Philips (brother-in-law); Anton Philips (great-nephew); Gerard Philips (great-nephew); Jean Longuet (great-grandson)

Henriette Marx (née Pressburg; (Note: Also spelt Presburg or Preßburg); Yiddish: הענריעטע פרעסבורג מארקס; 20 September 1788 – 30 November 1863) was a Dutch-born woman who was the mother of the communist philosopher Karl Marx.

== Life ==
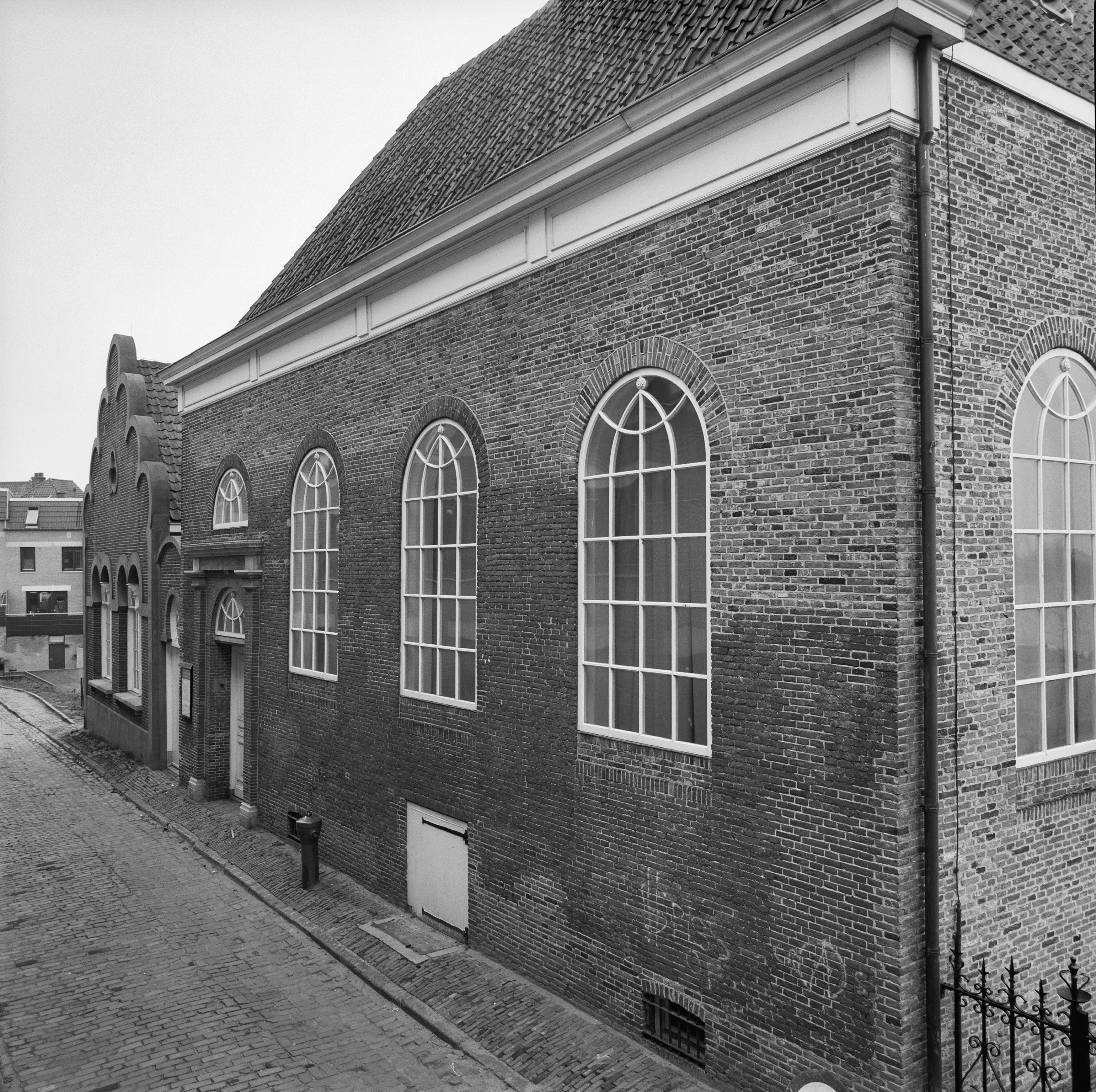
Synagogue in Nonnenstraat, Nijmegen, built in 1756.

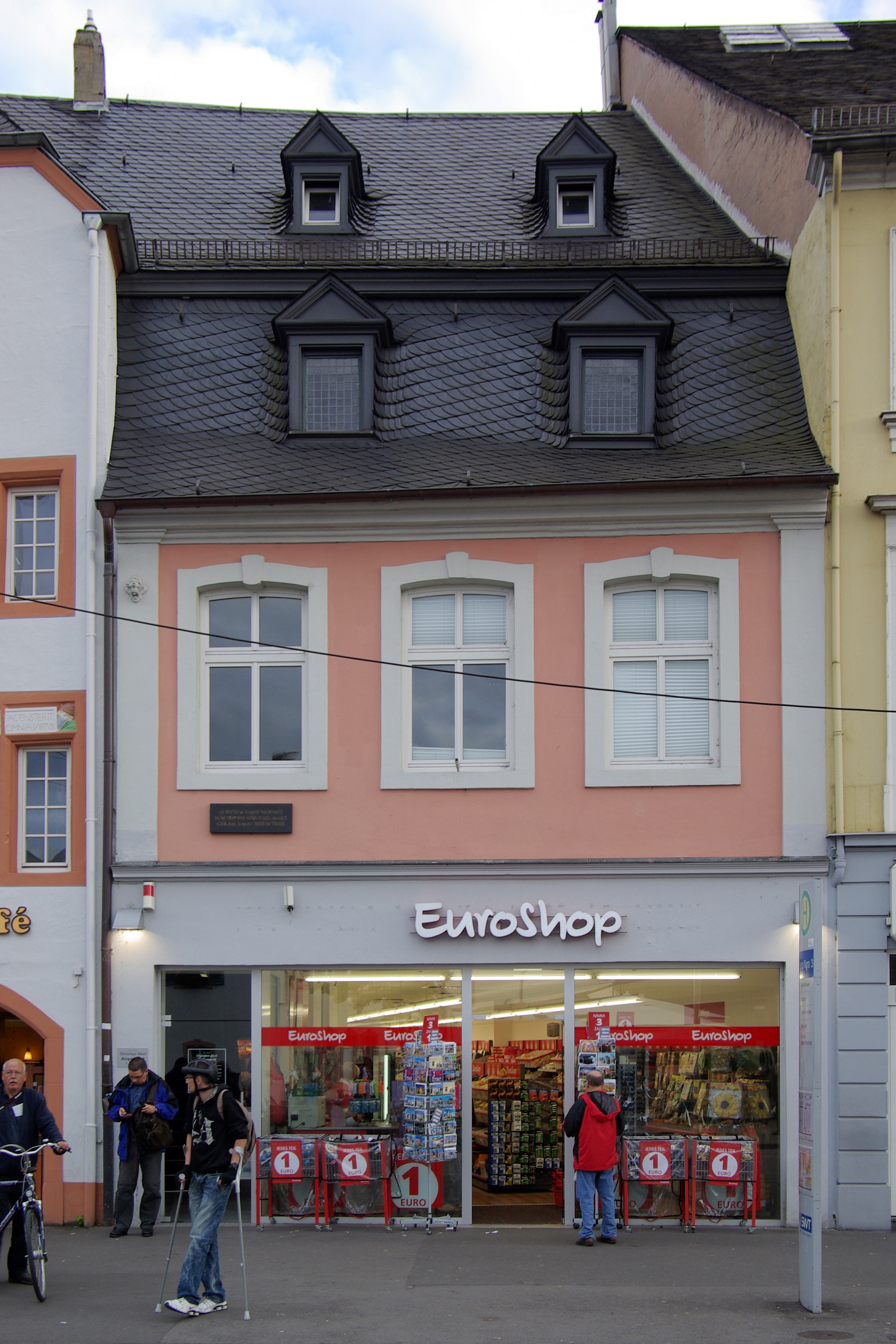
8, Simeonstrasse, Trier: home of Marx family 1819–42

Henriette Pressburg was born on 20 September 1788 in Nijmegen in the Netherlands. She was the second of the five children of Isaac Heymans Pressburg (Yiddish: יצחק היימנס פרעסבורג; 1747–1832) and Nanette Salomons Cohen (Yiddish: נאַנעט סאַלאָמאָן כהן; 1754–1833). The Pressburgs were a prosperous family, with Isaac working as a textile merchant. They were prominent members of Nijmegen's growing Jewish community, (Note: The number of Jews in the Nijmegen area: 1784: 270; 1809: 359; 1840: 506. Source: Jewish History Museum, Amsterdam.) living first in Nonnenstraat then, when Henriette was 19, in Grotestraat. Isaac was the cantor (Note: Some sources say Isaac was Rabbi of Nijmegen.) of the synagogue in Nonnenstraat where his father, Hirschl (or Chaim) Pressburg, had been the rabbi. There had been rabbis in the family for at least a century. The Cohens were also leading merchants based in London, with Nanette's father Shlomo developing a large business alongside his brother Levy Barent Cohen.

Henriette Pressburg married Hirschel Marx (later Heinrich Marx; 1777–1838) on 22 November 1814 in the Nijmegen Synagogue, she receiving a twenty thousand guilder dowry. The couple moved to Heinrich's home town of Trier in the Prussian Rhineland, where Heinrich worked successfully as a lawyer. Here they had nine children, four sons and five daughters, two sons dying when children. Karl, their third child, was born on 5 May 1818. In 1819 the family moved to a ten-room property opposite the ancient Roman Porta Nigra gateway, where Henriette lived with her family for the next 23 years.

In about 1817 Henriette's husband changed his name from Hirschel to Heinrich and was baptised into the Lutheran Church, followed by their children in August 1824. Henriette was baptised in November 1825. These conversions resulted in a complete break with Heinrich's family – his father was the rabbi of Trier – although Henriette continued to maintain close contact with her family in the Netherlands, her fourth child Hermann being born during a return visit to Nijmegen in August 1819.

Heinrich contracted tuberculosis and died in May 1838, when Henriette still had six of their children living at home. Although quite wealthy due to her inheritance, the family lived quite frugally.

== Relationship with Karl Marx ==
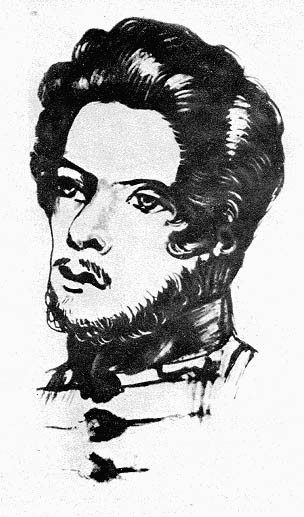
Karl Marx as a student, 1836

Karl was the third child and second son of Heinrich and Henriette Marx. Graduating from the Trier Gymnasium in 1835 at the age of seventeen, Karl enrolled in the University of Bonn, before moving to the University of Berlin. Henriette became concerned with his lifestyle away from home, including his membership of a local drinking society in Bonn. The health of her other children exacerbated Henriette's worries. While Karl was at University, her son Eduard, aged 11, died of tuberculosis, Karl showing signs of similar symptoms. (Note: McLellan's biography states: "[Karl] Marx seems to have suffered quite severely from the tendency to tuberculosis that killed so many of his family (Four of Karl Marx’s siblings eventually died of tuberculosis). The following year his military service was put off 'because of weakness of the lungs and periodical vomiting of blood'.") Her regular letters to Karl emphasised the importance of healthy living, she advised:

"you must never regard cleanliness and order as something secondary, for health and cheerfulness depend upon them. Insist strictly that your rooms are scrubbed frequently and fix a definite time for it – and you, my dear Karl, have a weekly scrub with sponge and soap."

After Karl wrote to his father admitting his lifestyle was affecting his health, she wrote: "you must avoid everything that could make things worse, you must not get over-heated, not drink a lot of wine or coffee, and not eat anything pungent, a lot of pepper or other spices. You must not smoke any tobacco, not stay up too late in the evening and always rise early. Be careful, also not to catch cold and, dear Karl, do not dance until you are quite well again."

Karl rarely seems to have replied to his family's letters or even visited them.

While his lifestyle and profligacy with money (Note: In November 1837 Heinrich wrote to his son Karl at Berlin University "As though we were made of gold, my gentleman son disposes of almost 700 thalers a single year … whereas the richest spend no more than 500." See McLellan, Karl Marx, A Biography, page 26) had already created tensions with his parents, Karl's relationship with his mother deteriorated further in the years after his father's death in 1838, with his requests for advances on his expected inheritance dominating their relationship, which became increasingly icy and distant.

Karl stayed in Trier for six weeks during 1842, after the death of his brother Hermann, and for the wedding of his sister Sophie. Things did not go well, with Karl referring to “the most disagreeable of family controversies. My family has put difficulties in my way which, despite their own prosperity, subject me to the most straitened circumstances.” Disagreements led to Karl moving mid-stay from the family home to a guest house nearby. The following year Karl married Jenny von Westphalen, neither Henriette, nor any other member of the Marx family, attending.

Over the years he complained repeatedly that his mother did not want to help him out of his financial distress, complaining to friends that while she lived he could not enjoy his inheritance. (Note: To Arnold Ruge "I have fallen out with my family and, as long as my mother lives, I have no right to my inheritance"; to Engels on the sudden death of Engels’ mistress Mary Burns in January 1856, "If only, instead of Mary, it had been my mother, who is full of physical infirmities anyway now, and has had her fair span of life"; and to Engels in May 1861 "My mother, with whom any discussion about cash is out of the question, but who is rapidly nearing her end, destroyed some I.O.U.'s I had given her in the past".) Henriette's view was that he should do more to earn money, commenting "if only Karl had made Capital, instead of just writing about it". (Note: Recalled by Karl Marx in a letter to Engels in 1868. See McLellan, Karl Marx, A Biography, page 356)

She did however pass funds to him from time to time, although things did not always go smoothly. In 1848, while Karl was living in Brussels, she paid him 6,000 francs. Suspecting that the funds might be intended to finance the revolutionary movement, the Belgian police asked the Trier authorities to question Henriette, they accepted her explanation that "her son had long been asking for money for his family and this was an advance on his inheritance".

Exiled from Germany during the 1850s, Karl again visited Germany in 1861. While there, he spent two days with Henriette in Trier, who agreed to cancel several of his older debts, although on his next short visit in August 1862 she refused to give him anything. This was the last time Henriette saw her son, as she died fifteen months later. Karl travelled to Trier for the funeral.

== Sophie Pressburg and Lion Philips ==
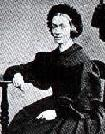
Sophie Pressburg

In 1820 Henriette's younger sister Sophie Pressburg (1797–1854) married the tobacco merchant Lion Philips (1794–1866) in the Nijmegen synagogue, before moving to the Dutch town of Zaltbommel. After the death of their mother in June 1833, Henriette agreed that Lion Philips would act as trustee for their parents' legacy for the benefit of the whole family. Lion was also executor of Henriette's will.

The Philips’ family got on well with Karl Marx, their nephew. He occasionally stayed with them in Zaltbommel, regularly corresponded with Lion Philips and often borrowed money against his legacy, particularly after he moved to London in 1849.

Lion and Sophie's son Frederik and grandson Gerard founded the Philips Electronics Company in 1891. Gerard's younger brother Anton joined the running of the company in 1912.

Of Henriette's brothers, David became a lawyer in Amsterdam and later in Paramaribo in Surinam and Martin remained in Nijmegen in the tobacco trade.

== Beliefs and outlook ==
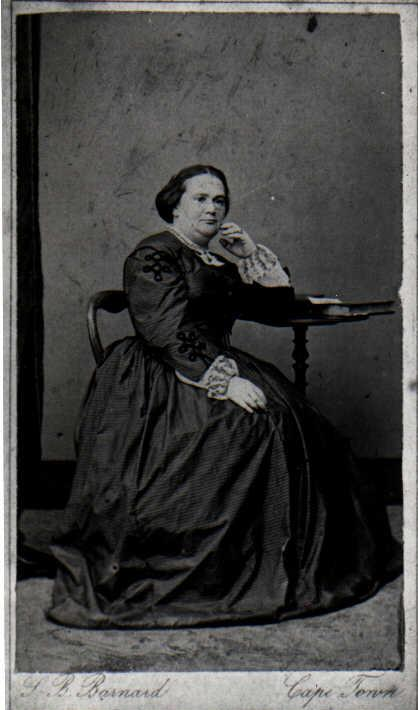
Louise Juta in 1863. One of Henriette's surviving children, she emigrated to South Africa with her husband in 1853

Henriette was the last of the family to be baptised, in November 1825, more than a year after her children and about eight years after her husband. Brought up in an orthodox Jewish household, she appeared to be more attached to Jewish culture than her husband and may have maintained some Jewish customs and practices within the Protestant family. She clearly remained more religious than her husband, telling friends "Yes, I believe in God, not for God's sake, but for my own."

Henriette was never completely at ease either in writing or in speaking high German, and biographers of Marx often describe Henriette as uneducated, and perhaps of modest intellect, (Note: For example: "a good mother without special intellectual gifts" (Otto Rühle, Karl Marx. Life and work, p 17. Avalun-Verlag. Dresden 1928.); an "uneducated woman entirely concerned for her large household, who did not have the least understanding of her son's gift or inclination" (Isaiah Berlin, Karl Marx: His Life and Environment, p 40. Oxford University Press, 1965.); "not exactly an intellectual" (Arnold Künzli, Karl Marx. Eine Psychographie, p 53. Europa Verlag, Vienna 1966.); "she was an uneducated - indeed only semi-literate - woman whose interests began and ended with her family." (Francis Wheen, Karl Marx, p 12. Fourth Estate, London, 2000.)) a view partly based on her surviving letters written in ungrammatical German with little punctuation. However this flawed German may suggest that Yiddish was her mother tongue, (Note: While Yiddish grammar has many similarities to German, many elements originate from Slavic languages, Hebrew and Aramaic. It uses a variant of the Hebrew alphabet. Dovid Katz, Grammar of the Yiddish Language, Duckworth, London, 1987 ISBN 0-7156-2161-0) while her speech also reflected the fact that she grew up in the Netherlands and only moved to a German speaking city in her mid-twenties. Indeed, she always felt something of a stranger in Trier, being both closely attached to her own family and the country of her birth. (Note: For example, Henriette's children had frequent contact - both visits and correspondence - with her sister Sophie and her Dutch husband in the Dutch town of Zaltbommel. Of the four of her daughters who married, two - Sophie and Louise - married Dutchmen)

Clearly Henriette's main preoccupation was the care of her large family which, over the years, suffered illness and a number of bereavements, five of her nine children predeceasing her. (Note: Of Henriette's children, Mauritz died at the age of three in 1819, and Eduard aged eleven in 1837. By 1842, with the death of Hermann at the age of 22, Karl was his sole surviving son. Two daughters, Henriette and Caroline, also died in their twenties. Four of the five deaths were due to tuberculosis.) She admitted to having "excessive mother love", confirmed by Heinrich who wrote to their son Karl that "you know your mother and how anxious she is." Her daughters described her in positive terms, Emilie saying that her "dear mother enjoyed life and was an angel in going without if necessary and in dealing with family bereavement", while Sophie described her as "small and delicate, and very intelligent. After all, she was a good housekeeper, who knew how to manage her inheritance and left her children with a greater sum than she herself inherited. She handled money better than her famous son Karl Marx.’’

== Later years ==
Henriette Marx continued to live in Trier, where she died on 30 November 1863, aged 75. (Note: On hearing the news of his mother's death, Karl commented "Fate laid claim to one of our family. I myself already have one foot in the grave. Circumstances being what they were, I, presumably, was needed here more than my mother.") She was buried at the Protestant cemetery after a service at the Lutheran Church of the Redeemer. She left her four surviving children substantial legacies, although much of Karl's share was paid to his uncle Lion Philips in settlement of his debts.
