= Jennie Stoller =

British actress (1946–2018)

- Born: Jennifer Stoller; 26 April 1946; Finchley, London, England, United Kingdom
- Died: 18 November 2018 (aged 72); London, England, United Kingdom
- Occupation: Actress
- Years active: 1966–2018

Jennifer Stoller (26 April 1946 – 18 November 2018) was a British actress. In a career spanning almost 40 years, she appeared in TV, film, stage and radio productions.

== Early life ==
Stoller was born in Finchley, north London, to Jewish parents. Her father, Sam Stoller, was a fishmonger, of Russian and Lithuanian descent, and her mother Ada (née Pottersman), was from Łódź, Poland. Stoller attended La Sagesse, a Catholic convent school, in Golders Green. After completing high school, Stoller attended the Drama Centre theatre school in London, however in 1966 she was asked to leave as she was not considered suitable for group dramatic work.

== Career ==
Following her training at the Drama Centre, Stoller worked in repertory theatre for a number of years, and in theatre-in-education groups. In 1971 she joined Nancy Meckler's Freehold company. Meckler was an American director and Stoller appeared in a number of new works, including works by American Sam Shepard. Stoller was also a member of the Royal Shakespeare Company in the 1970s, playing Helena in the 1972 world tour of Peter Brook's production of A Midsummer Night's Dream, and was later a founding member of its offshoot company Joint Stock. She also performed with the Royal Court Theatre and the National Theatre of England. In 1983 she performed in New York City as part of the New York Shakespeare Festival.

In 2009 Stoller performed in Caryl Churchill's play Seven Jewish Children at the Royal Court Theatre. The BBC refused to broadcast the play on radio due to its political nature; in response, The Guardian hired theatre director Elliot Smith to produce a version of the play that could be shared on its website, and Stoller performed the play as a monologue.

Stoller was a member of the BBC Radio Drama Company and appeared in over 100 radio broadcasts. She also appeared in television series, notably in the role of Annabelle Harborough in the 1981 series Sapphire & Steel, and a small number of films. In her later years, Stoller taught and directed theatre productions for London theatre schools.

== Death ==
Stoller died in London on 18 November 2018 of cancer. She was 72 years old.

=== Stage appearances ===
Year	Production	Theatre company	Notes
1972	A Midsummer Night's Dream	Royal Shakespeare Company	
1974	Action	Royal Court Theatre	
1977	The Elephant Man	Hampstead Theatre	
1983	Fen	Almeida	
1984	Cries from the Mammal House	Royal Court Theatre	
1989	The House of Bernarda Alba	Lyceum Theatre, Edinburgh	
1993	The Mountain Giants	National Theatre of England	
1996	The Oedipus Plays	National Theatre of England	
2008	Three Sisters	Liverpool Everyman	
2009	Seven Jewish Children	Royal Court Theatre	

=== Television appearances ===
Year	Title	Notes
1977	Eleanor Marx	
1981	Sapphire & Steel	
1983	Grange Hill	
1991	Shrinks	

=== Film appearances ===
Year	Title	Notes
	Genghis Khan	
1985	The Good Father	
1991	King Ralph	

=== Radio appearances ===
Year	Title	Notes
2008	Shylock	
2006	Adulteries Of A Provincial Wife	
2001	Little Dorrit	
2001	Tess of the D'Urbervilles	
2000	The American Dentist	
