= Frans Otten =

Dutch business executive

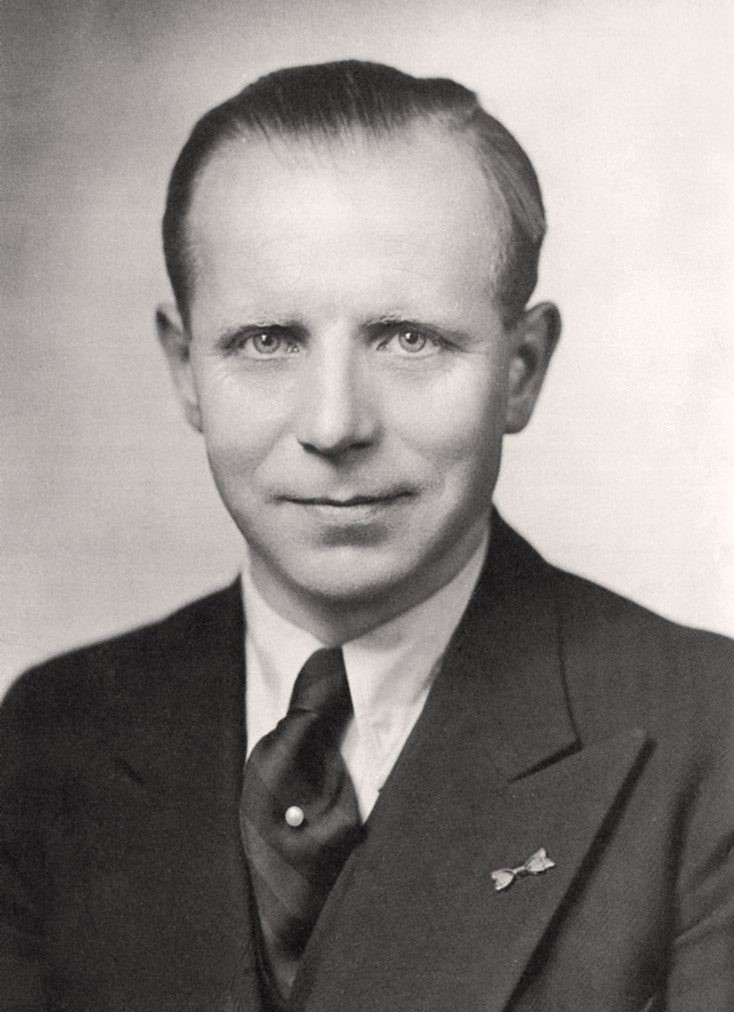
Frans Otten (1930s)

Pieter Franciscus Sylvester "Frans" Otten (31 December 1895 in Berlin – 4 January 1969 in Valkenswaard) was a Dutch business executive, who was the CEO of the international electronics firm Philips from 1939 to 1961. He was the son-in-law of the co-founder of the company, Anton Philips. He was married to Anna Elisabeth Cornelia Philips (1899–1996) and they had two sons, Diek and Franz. His brother-in-law was Frits Philips.

The Frans Otten Stadium in Amsterdam is named for him.
