= Lion Philips =

Dutch tobacco merchant

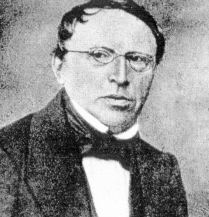
- Born: October 29, 1794; Zaltbommel
- Died: December 28, 1866 (aged 72)
- Occupation: Tobacco merchant
- Known for: Supporting Karl Marx
- Spouse: Sophie Pressburg
- Children: Frederik Philips

Lion Philips (29 October 1794 – 28 December 1866) was a Dutch tobacco merchant. He is the grandfather of Gerard and Anton Philips of Philips Electronics, and was a financial supporter of Karl Marx.

== Early life and family ==
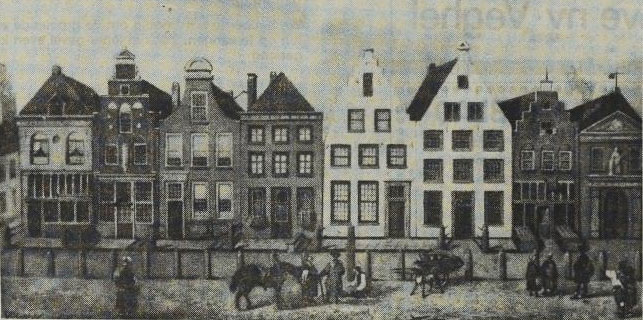
The Market Square of Zaltbommel around 1850. The fourth home on the right is the home of Lion Philips

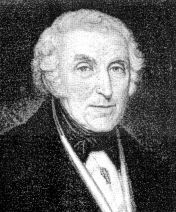
Portrait of Benjamin Philips, father of Lion Philips

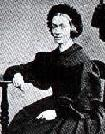
Portrait of Sophie Pressburg, wife of Lion Philips

Lion Philips was born in Zaltbommel, Netherlands. His parents were Benjamin Philips and Lea Hartog, who moved there from Veenendaal. He was the eldest of nine children; seven boys and two girls. Among his siblings, only he chose to stay in Zaltbommel; the others spread across the world to benefit their business.

Lion married Sophie Pressburg from Nijmegen. Sophie's sister Henriëtte married German lawyer Heinrich Marx and was the mother of Karl Marx. Sophie and Lion had nine children, including August Philips, who was a lawyer and dean of the Amsterdam Bar Association; and banker Frederik Philips who, together with his son Gerard Philips, established the Philips Electronics Company, the first Dutch incandescent light company, in 1891. Gerard's younger brother Anton joined the company in 1912.

== Career ==
In 1815, Lion and a partner, Gerlacus Ribbius Peletier, started a tobacco company, "The Unicorn". The successors of this company remained active in the tobacco trade until the second half of the twentieth century. In addition to trading tobacco, the Philips pursued other businesses, including a blanket factory, which later burned down. At the time of his death in 1866, his capital was estimated at around NLG 189,000.

== Religion ==
The Philips family was of Jewish origin. Lion Philips and his father Benjamin joined the Dutch Reformed Church on 1 February 1826 with their respective families. Full Jewish emancipation had been in place in the Netherlands since 1796, eliminating trade and other obstacles to the faith.

== Karl Marx ==
Marx and Philips had a close relationship; Marx regularly stayed with the Philips family in Nijmegen and later in Zaltbommel. Seven letters to Marx and seven to Philips are known. These letters cover issues ranging from the American Civil War to the discovery of electricity. One of the main reasons for the strong involvement was money. Philips was Marx's main sponsor and the business mediator between him and Henriëtte Pressburg. This was necessary, because the relationship between Marx and his mother was poor, Marx writing: "I have fallen out with my family and, as long as my mother lives, I have no right to my inheritance". As a result, Philips granted Marx allowances, first from the legacy of Heinrich Marx, then as advances on the legacy of Henriëtte.

After Henriëtte's death in 1863, Lion, who was named one of her executors, paid what remained after Karl's inheritance: seven thousand guilders, a considerable sum. In addition, Philips occasionally offered extras, after a lot of flattery: "I squeezed £160 out of my uncle so that we were able to pay off the greater part of our debts", Marx wrote to Friedrich Engels on 7 May 1861.

Marx found "a hospitable home" with Lion Philips and his family. In addition, he was able to "conduct intellectual discussions with open-minded, liberal ubiquists".

== Cultural reference ==
In the Soviet TV series Karl Marks, Molodye gody (Карл Маркс: Молодые годы, "Karl Marx's early years") the role of Lion Philips is played by the Soviet actor Leonid Bronevoy.

== Bibliography ==
- A. Heerding The history of N.V. Philips' gloeilampenfabrieken Volume 1 The origin of the Dutch incandescent lamp industry translated by Derek Jordon
- A. Heerding The history of N.V. Philips' gloeilampenfabrieken Volume 2: A company of many parts translated by Derek Jordon
- I.J. Blanken The history of N.V. Philips' gloeilampenfabrieken The development of N.V. Philips' Gloeilampenfabrieken into a major electrical group Volume 3 translated by C. Pettiward
- I.J. Blanken The history of N.V. Philips' gloeilampenfabrieken Under German rule Volume 4 translated by C. Pettiward
- Werner Blumenberg : "Ein unbekanntes Kapitel aus Marx 'Leben. Briefe an die holländischen Verwandten . In: International Review of Social History, 1, 1956, No. 1, S. 54-111
- The Netherlands Patriciaat . Bd. 50, The Hague 1964, S. 330-343
- Heinz Monz: Der Erbteilungsvertraag Henriette Marx . In: De Antiquaar, Hilversum 1971, II. Jg., S. 6 ff
- Heinz Monz: Karl Marx. Ground layers zu Leben und Werk . NCO-Verlag, Trier 1973
- Manfred Schöncke: Karl and Heinrich Marx and ihre Geschwister . Köln 1993 ISBN 3-89144-185-1
- Jan Gielkens: " If only I were in Bommel again": Karl Marx and his Dutch relatives: a family history in documents / delivered and collected. . Amsterdam 1997 ISBN 90-6861-099-6
- Jan Gielkens: Karl Marx und seine niederländischen Verwandten. Eine kommentierte Quellenedition . Trier 1999 [vielmehr April 2000] (= Scriptures from the Karl-Marx-Haus 50) ISBN 3-86077-845-5
- Izumi Omura ua (Hrsg.): Marx privat family - Die Foto- und Fragebogen-Alben von Marx 'Laura and Jenny - Eine kommentierte Faksimileausgabe. Akademie Verlag, Berlin 2005. ISBN 3-05-004118-8
