= Gerard Philips =

Dutch industrialist (1858–1942)

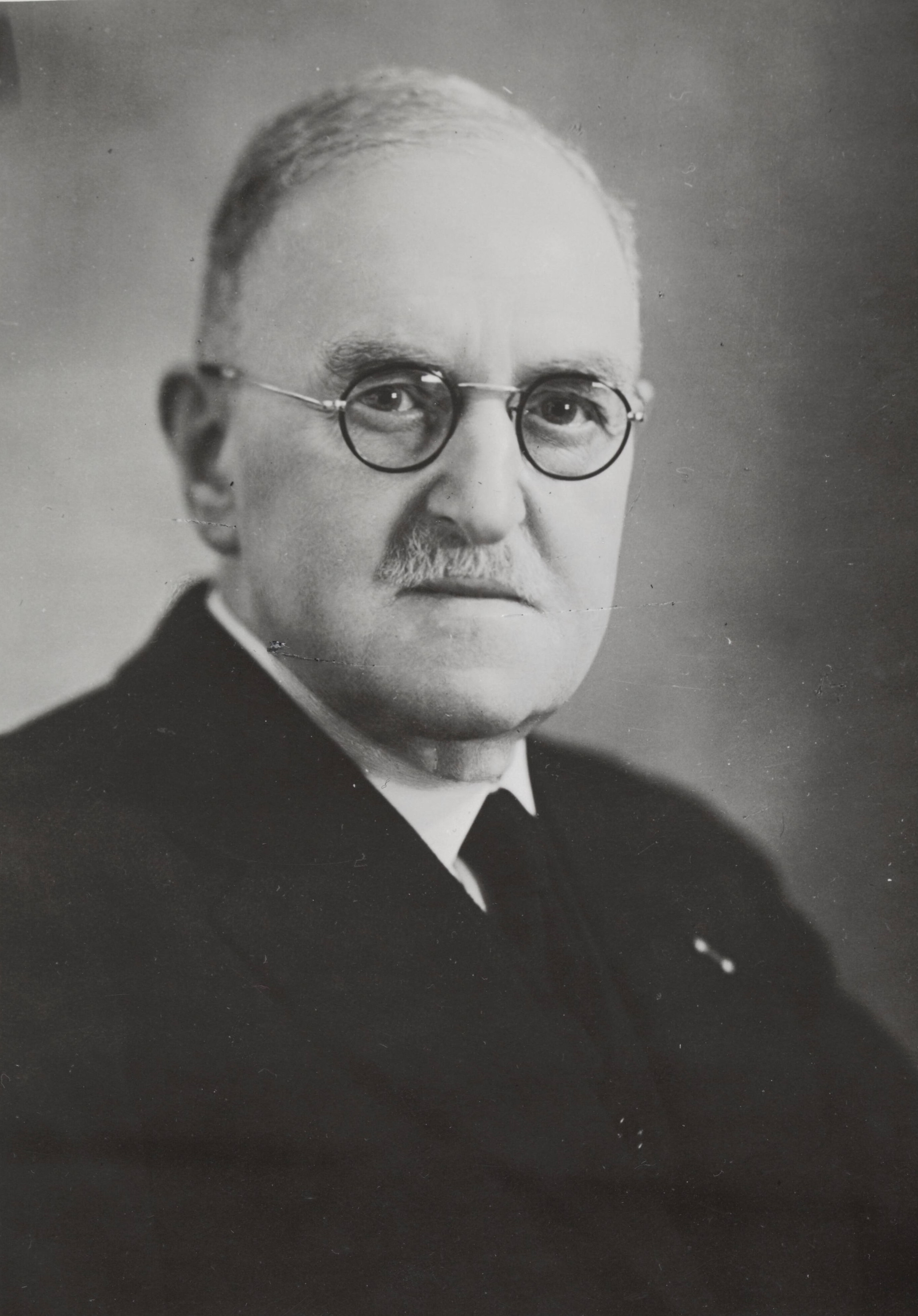
- Portrait of Gerard Philips
- Born: Gerard Leonard Frederik Philips; 9 October 1858; Zaltbommel, Netherlands
- Died: 26 January 1942 (aged 83); The Hague, occupied Netherlands
- Education: Delft University of Technology
- Known for: Founding Philips
- Spouse: Johanna van der Willigen
- Parents: Frederik Philips (father); Maria Heyligers (mother)
- Relatives: Philips family, Karl Marx

Gerard Leonard Frederik Philips (9 October 1858 – 26 January 1942) was a Dutch industrialist and co-founder, with his father Frederik Philips, of Philips as a family business in 1891. In 1912, Gerard and his younger brother Anton Philips converted the business to a corporation by founding NV Philips' Gloeilampenfabrieken.

== Career and family ==
Born to a Jewish Dutch family, his father Benjamin Frederik David Philips was a first cousin to Karl Marx (Gerard's paternal grandmother Sophie Pressburg was a sister of Henriette Pressburg, the mother of Karl Marx). His mother was Maria Heyligers. His grandfather was tobacco merchant Lion Philips.

Gerard Philips became interested in electronics and engineering. His father Frederik financed Gerard's purchase of the old factory building in Eindhoven where he established the first factory in 1891. With his brother he came up with a plan: cost effective, reliable incandescent light bulbs. They initially operated the Philips Company as a family business, with Gerard's younger brother Anton and Anton's son Frits Philips and son-in-law Frans Otten later brought into the business.

On 19 March 1896, Philips married Johanna van der Willigen (30 September 1862 – 1942). They had no children.

== Civic activities ==
Gerard and his brother Anton supported education and social initiatives in Eindhoven, including the Philips Sport Vereniging (Philips Sports Association), which they founded. From it the professional football department developed into the independent Philips Sport Vereniging N.V.
