= Anton Philips =

Dutch industrialist (1874–1951)

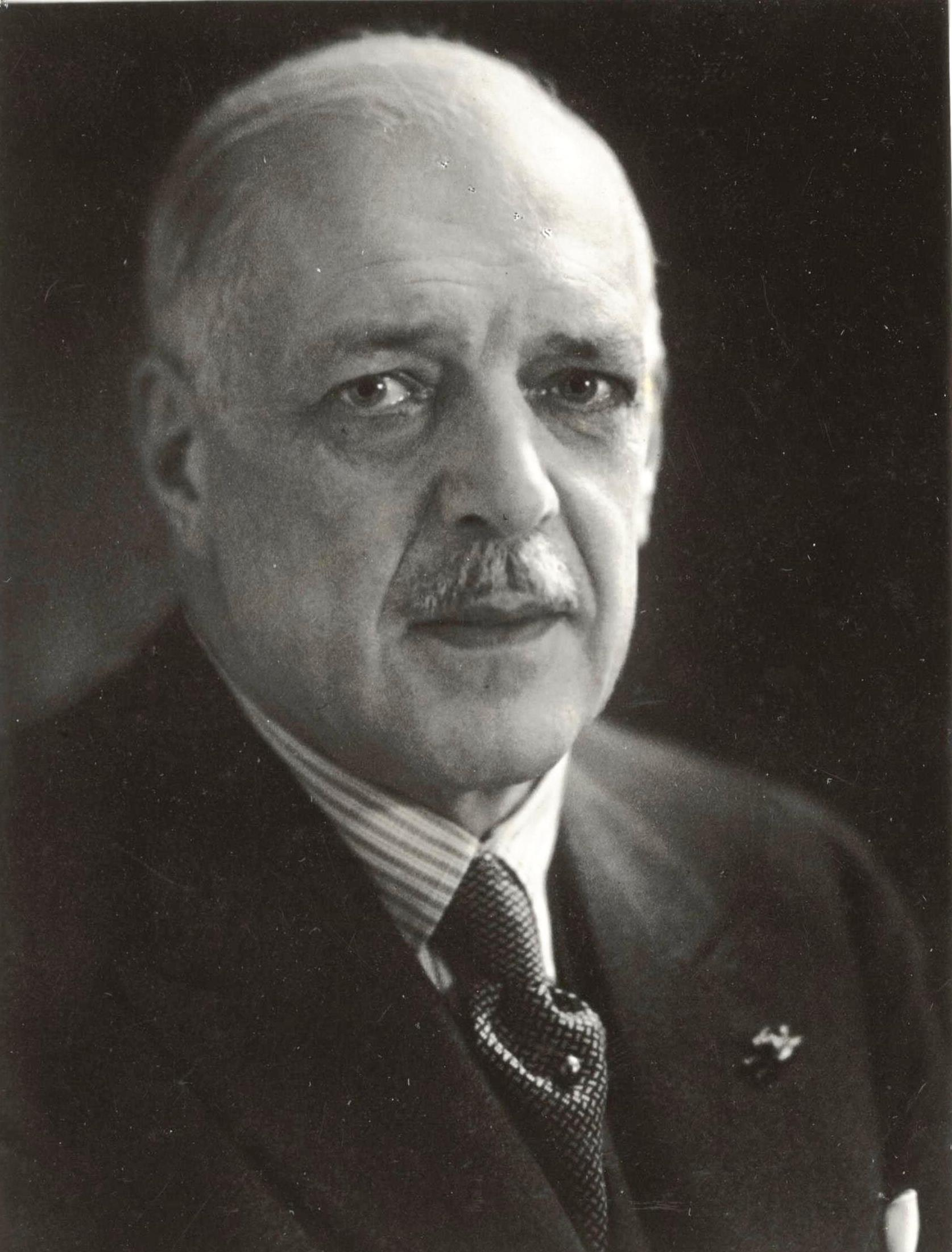
- (photo by Franz Ziegler)
- Born: Anton Frederik Philips; 14 March 1874; Zaltbommel, Gelderland, Netherlands
- Died: 7 October 1951 (aged 77); Eindhoven, North Brabant, Netherlands
- Known for: Founding Royal Philips Electronics N.V.
- Spouse: Anne Henriëtte Elisabeth Maria de Jongh
- Children: 3 (including Frits Philips)
- Parent(s): Frederik Philips (1830–1900); Maria Heyligers (1836–1921)
- Relatives: Gerard Philips (1858–1942) (brother); Lion Philips (grandfather); Karl Marx (uncle)

Anton Frederik Philips (14 March 1874 – 7 October 1951) was a Dutch businessman. He is one of the co-founders of the Royal Philips Electronics N.V. in 1912 with his older brother Gerard Philips in Eindhoven, Netherlands. His father and Gerard had founded the Philips Company in 1891 as a family business and Anton was chief executive officer from 1922 to 1939.

== Early life and education ==
Born to a Dutch family, Anton was the second son to Maria Heyligers (1836 – 1921) and Benjamin Frederik David Philips (1 December 1830 – 12 June 1900). His father was active in the tobacco business and a banker at Zaltbommel in the Netherlands (he was also a first cousin to Karl Marx). Anton had an elder brother, Gerard Philips.

== Career ==
In May 1891 the father Frederik was the financier and, with his son Gerard Philips, co-founder of the Philips Company as a family business. In 1912 Anton joined the firm, which they renamed Philips Gloeilampenfabriek N.V. ("Philips Lightbulb Factory")

During World War I, Anton Philips managed to increase sales by taking advantage of a boycott of German goods in several countries. He provided the markets with alternative products.

Anton (and his brother Gerard) are remembered as being civic-minded. In Eindhoven they supported education and social programmes and facilities, such as the football department of the Philips Sports Association, which is the best known. From it the professional football department developed into the independent Philips Sport Vereniging N.V. (PSV Eindhoven).

Anton Philips brought his son Frits Philips and son-in-law Frans Otten into the company in their times. Anton, Otten and other family members escaped the Netherlands just before the Nazi Occupation during World War II. They went to the United States and returned after the war.

Frits Philips chose to stay and manage the company during the occupation. He was imprisoned for several months at the concentration camp of Vught after his workers went on strike, and he survived. He saved the lives of 382 Jews by claiming them as indispensable to his factory, and enabled them to evade Nazi roundups and deportation to concentration camps. He was honoured with the title Righteous Among the Nations by the State of Israel in 1996.

Anton Philips died in Eindhoven in 1951. He was awarded Order of Saint Sava and other decorations.

There is a museum dedicated to his life in Eindhoven. It recreates the initial factory and the company's journey.

== Marriage and family ==
Philips married Anne Henriëtte Elisabeth Maria de Jongh (Amersfoort, 30 May 1878 – Eindhoven, 7 March 1970). They had the following children:

- Anna Elisabeth Cornelia Philips (19 June 1899 – 4 April 1996), married in 1925 to Pieter Franciscus Sylvester Otten (1895 – 1969), and had Diek and Franz Otten (b. c. 1928 – d. 1967); Franz became a manager in his grandfather's company Philips.
- Frederik Jacques Philips (1905–2005)
- Henriëtte Anna Philips (Eindhoven, 26 October 1906 – 2007), married firstly to A. Knappert (d. 1932), without issue. Married secondly to Jonkheer G. Sandberg (d. 5 September 1935), without issue. Married thirdly in New York City, New York, on 29 September 1938 to Jonkheer Hendrik Abraham Cornelis (Henk) van Riemsdijk (Aerdenhout, 10 January 1911 – Eindhoven, 8 November 2005). They had the following children:
  - Jonkvrouw Anne Henriëtte van Riemsdijk (b. Waalre, 2 October 1939), married at Waalre on 17 February 1968 to Johannes Jasper Tuijt (b. Atjeh, Koeta Radja, 10 March 1930), son of Jacobus Tuijt and wife Hedwig Jager, without issue
  - Jonkvrouw Henriëtte Adriënne Leopoldine van Riemsdijk (b. Waalre, 3 April 1946), married firstly at Calvados, Falaise, on 6 June 1974 to Martinus Jan Petrus Vermooten (Utrecht, 16 September 1939 – Falaise, 29 August 1978), without issue. Married secondly in Paris on 12 December 1981 to Jean Yves Louis Bedos (Calvados, Rémy, 9 January 1947 – Calvados, Lisieux, 5 October 1982), without issue. Married thirdly at Manche, Sartilly, on 21 September 1985 to Arnaud Evain (b. Ardennes, Sedan, 7 July 1952).
  - Jonkvrouw Margarete Juliana Cornélie van Riemsdijk (b. Waalre, 4 September 1948), married at Waalre, 28 October 1972 to Elie Johan François van Dissel (b. Eindhoven, 9 October 1948), without issue.
