= Longuet =

Longuet is a surname of French origin. It may refer to:

- Benjamin Longuet (1685–1761), English banker and Governor of the Bank of England 1747–49
- Charles Longuet (1839–1903), French journalist and socialist
- Charles Stephen Longuet (1861–1941), New Zealand lawyer and Mayor of Invercargill
- Didi Longuet (born 1981), Dutch professional footballer
- Edgar Longuet (1879–1950), French physician and socialist, grandson of Karl Marx
- Gérard Longuet (born 1946), French conservative politician
- Jean Longuet (1876–1938), French socialist, son of Jenny and Charles Longuet, grandson of Karl Marx
- Jenny Longuet (1844–1883), daughter of Jenny and Karl Marx, and wife of Charles Longuet
- Karl-Jean Longuet (1904–1981), French sculptor, son of Jean Longuet
- Robert-Jean Longuet (1901–1987), French lawyer and journalist

== See also ==
- H. Christopher Longuet-Higgins (1923–2004), English theoretical chemist and a cognitive scientist.
- Michael S. Longuet-Higgins (1925–2016), English mathematician and oceanographer at Institute for Nonlinear Science, brother of H. Christopher Longuet-Higgins
