= Tomb of Karl Marx =

Tomb in Highgate Cemetery, London

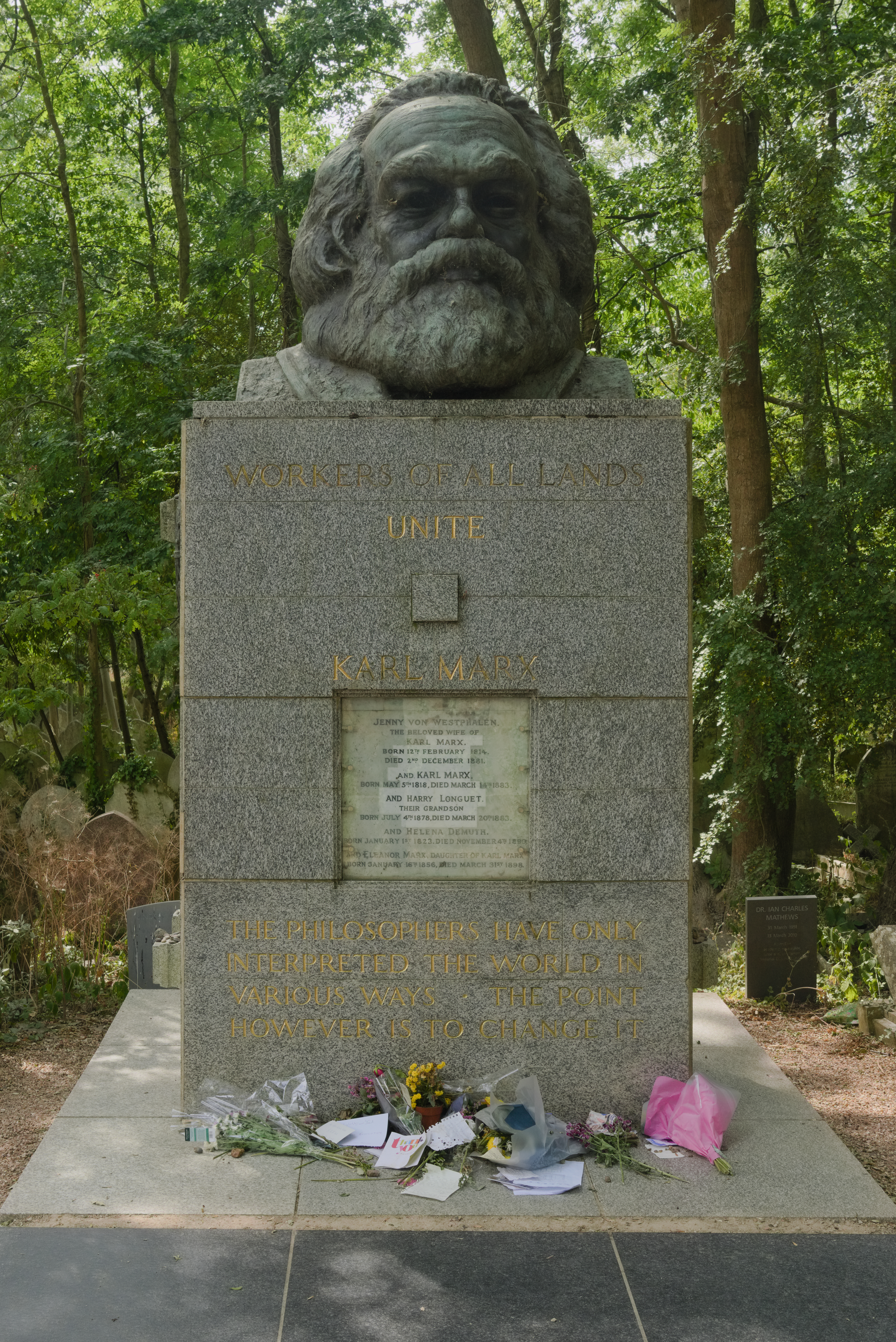
- Artist: Laurence Bradshaw
- Completion date: 1956
- Type: Sculpture
- Medium: Bronze
- Subject: Karl Marx
- Dimensions: 3.7 m (12 ft)
- Location: Highgate Cemetery London, N6; 51.5662°N 0.1439°W

Listed Building – Grade I
- Official name: Tomb of Karl Marx and family
- Designated: 14 May 1974
- Reference no.: 1378872

The Tomb of Karl Marx is in the Eastern cemetery of Highgate Cemetery, North London, England. It is the burial site of Karl Marx, his wife Jenny von Westphalen, and other members of Marx's family, including his daughter Eleanor Marx. Originally buried in a different part of the Eastern cemetery, the bodies were disinterred and reburied at their present location in 1954. The tomb was designed by Laurence Bradshaw and it was unveiled in 1956, in a ceremony led by Harry Pollitt, the General Secretary of the Communist Party of Great Britain, which funded the memorial.

The tomb consists of a large bust of Marx in bronze set on a marble pedestal. The pedestal is inscribed with quotes from Marx's works including, on the front, the final words of The Communist Manifesto, "Workers of all lands unite". Since its construction, the tomb has become a place of pilgrimage for followers of Marxist theory. It has also been a target for Marx's opponents, suffering vandalism, and two bomb attacks in the 1970s. It is a Grade I listed structure, the highest listing reserved for buildings and structures of "exceptional interest".

== History ==
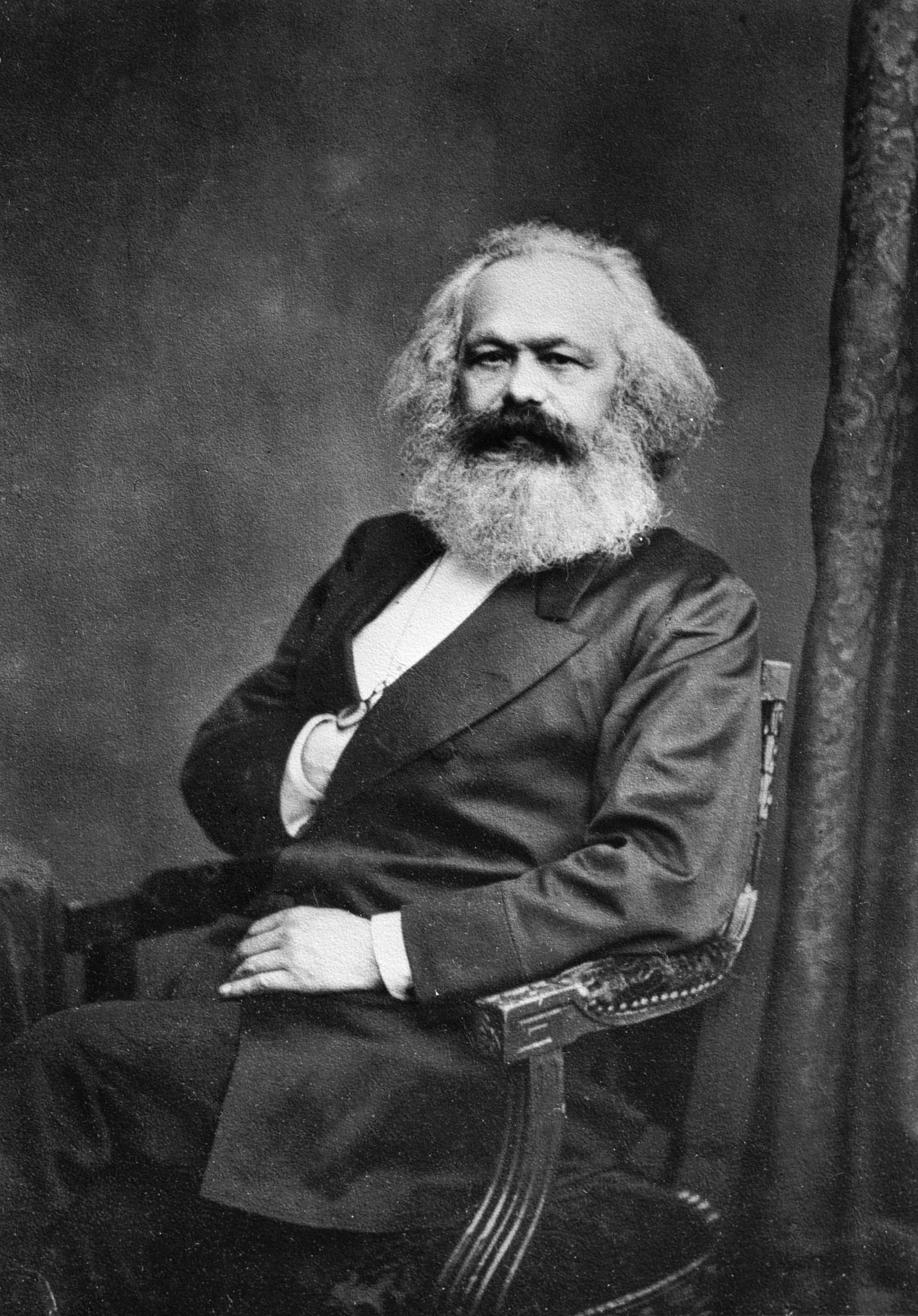
Karl Marx in 1875

Marx moved to London as a political exile in June 1849. Living originally in Soho, he moved in 1875 to Maitland Park Road, in the north London area of Belsize Park, and this remained his home until his death in 1883. During this period, Marx wrote some of his most notable works, including The Eighteenth Brumaire of Louis Napoleon and Das Kapital. Throughout his time in London, Marx lived in financially straitened circumstances and was heavily reliant on the support of his friend and collaborator Friedrich Engels. Marx died on the afternoon of 14 March 1883 from a combination of bronchitis and pleurisy, exacerbated by an abscess on his lung. He was buried on the following Saturday, at Highgate Cemetery, in the grave prepared for his wife who had died eighteen months previously. Engels spoke the eulogy at the funeral.

At least thirteen named individuals attended the funeral. They were Engels, Eleanor Marx, Edward Aveling, Paul Lafargue, Charles Longuet, Helene Demuth, Wilhelm Liebknecht, Gottlieb Lemke, Frederich Lessner, Georg Lochner, Sir Ray Lankester, Carl Schorlemmer and Ernest Radford. A contemporary newspaper account claims that 25 to 30 relatives and friends attended the funeral. A writer in The Graphic noted that, 'By a strange blunder ...his death was not announced for two days, and then as having taken place at Paris. Next day the correction came from Paris; and when his friends and followers hastened to his house in Haverstock Hill, to learn the time and place of burial, they learned that he was already in the cold ground. But for this secresy [sic] and haste, a great popular demonstration would undoubtedly have been held over his grave'.

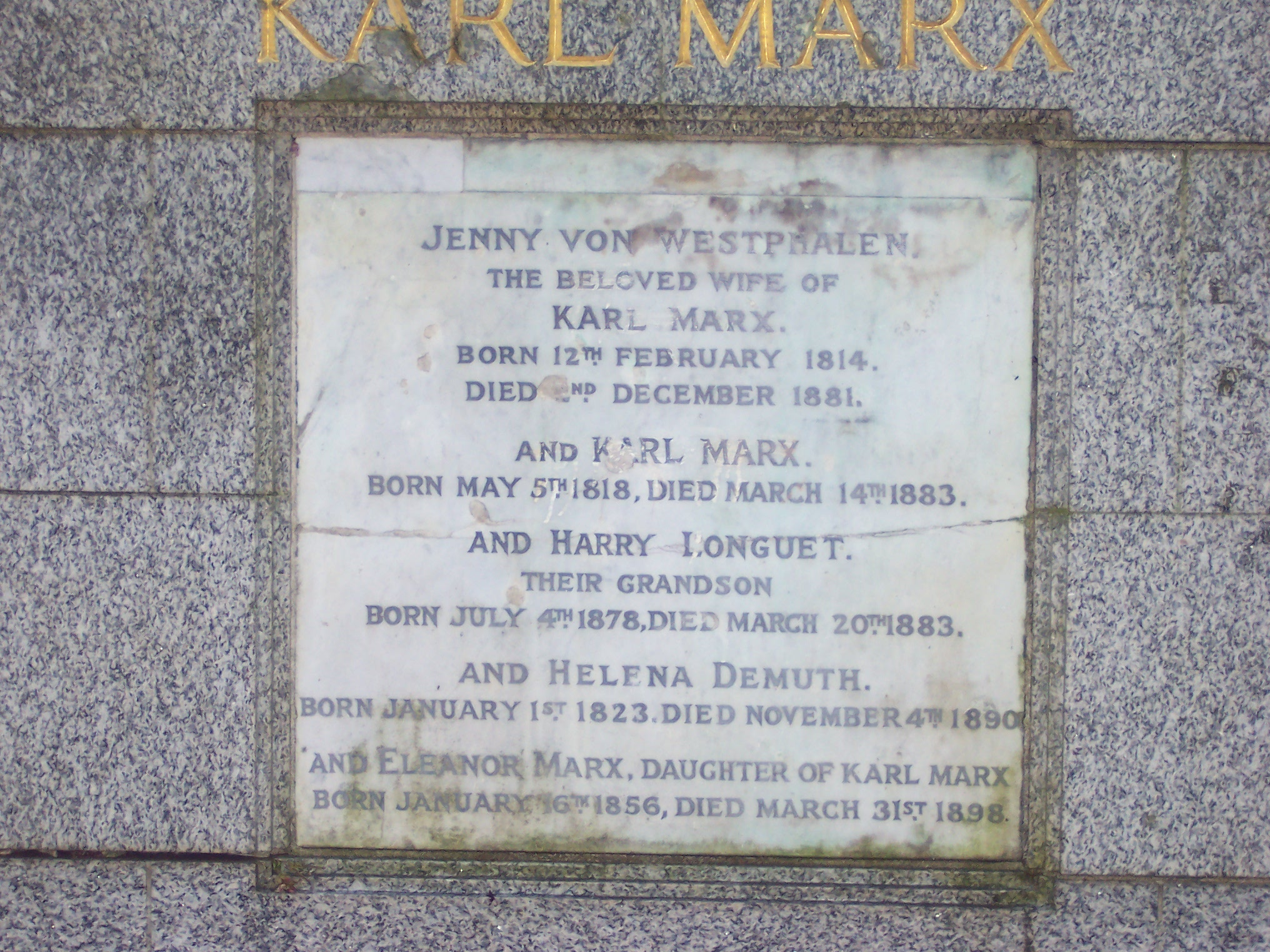
The tomb of Karl Marx: detailed view of the central panel which formed the original gravestone

In 1954, the Marx Memorial Committee, with the agreement of Frederick and Robert-Jean Longuet, Marx's great-grandsons, applied to the Home Office for an exhumation licence allowing the bodies of Marx, his wife, other family members and the Marxs’ housekeeper Helene Demuth to be disinterred and reburied at a new site, some 100 yards from the original graves. The reburials took place during the night of 26/27 November 1954. The reburials were the precursor to the construction of the Karl Marx tomb, designed by Laurence Bradshaw and funded by the Communist Party of Great Britain. The unveiling ceremony on 15 March 1956 was led by the Party's General Secretary, Harry Pollit.

Since its construction, the tomb has become a place of veneration for Marx's followers, including some, such as the anti-apartheid activist Yusuf Dadoo and the founder of the Notting Hill Carnival Claudia Jones, who have been buried nearby.

The tomb is owned by the Marx Grave Trust. (Note: The Trust is represented by the Marx Memorial Library, based in Clerkenwell, East London. The Library holds the collection of Laurence Bradshaw papers, including preparatory sketches for the tomb.) The Friends of Highgate Cemetery Trust, which owns the cemetery, charges an entrance fee to the cemetery to cover the costs of upkeep and maintenance; this has generated some controversy. Marx's grave is among the most visited sites at Highgate and has been described as "one of the most recognisable graves in the world".

=== Vandalism ===
In 1960, a pair of yellow swastikas were painted on the tomb, as well as slogans in German supporting Nazi SS officer Adolf Eichmann, who was then in custody in Israel. The tomb was the subject of two bombing attempts in the 1970s. The tomb was daubed in blue paint in 2011, but no lasting damage was done.

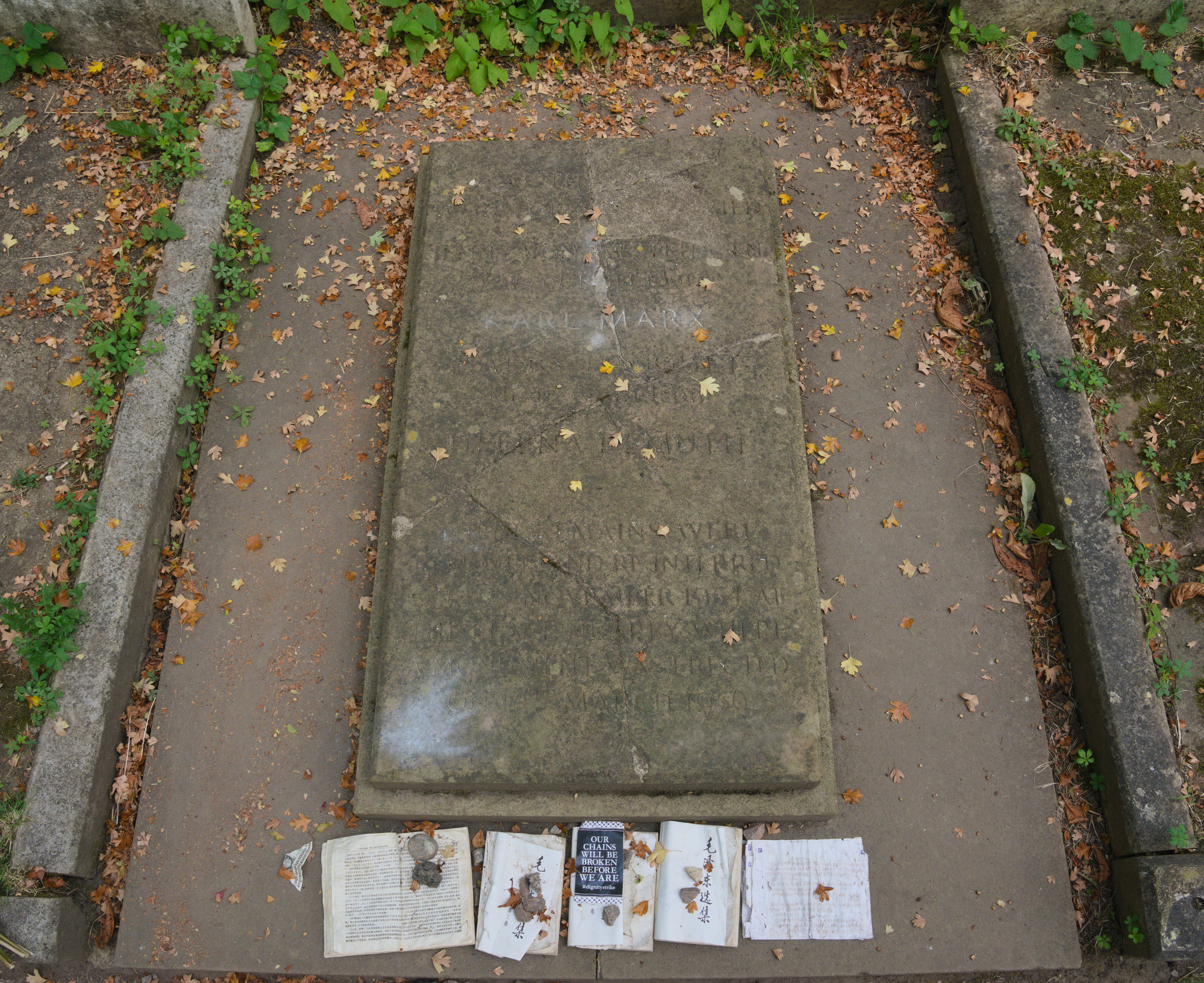
Former Karl Marx grave at the Highgate Cemetery

In February 2019, it was discovered that the marble plaque from the original grave was damaged in an attack "seemingly with a hammer". A few days later, the monument was vandalised again, the attacker daubing it with the words "doctrine of hate" and "architect of genocide" in red paint. As a result, the Marx Grave Trust decided to install 24-hour video surveillance around the grave to deter further vandalism.

== Architecture and description ==
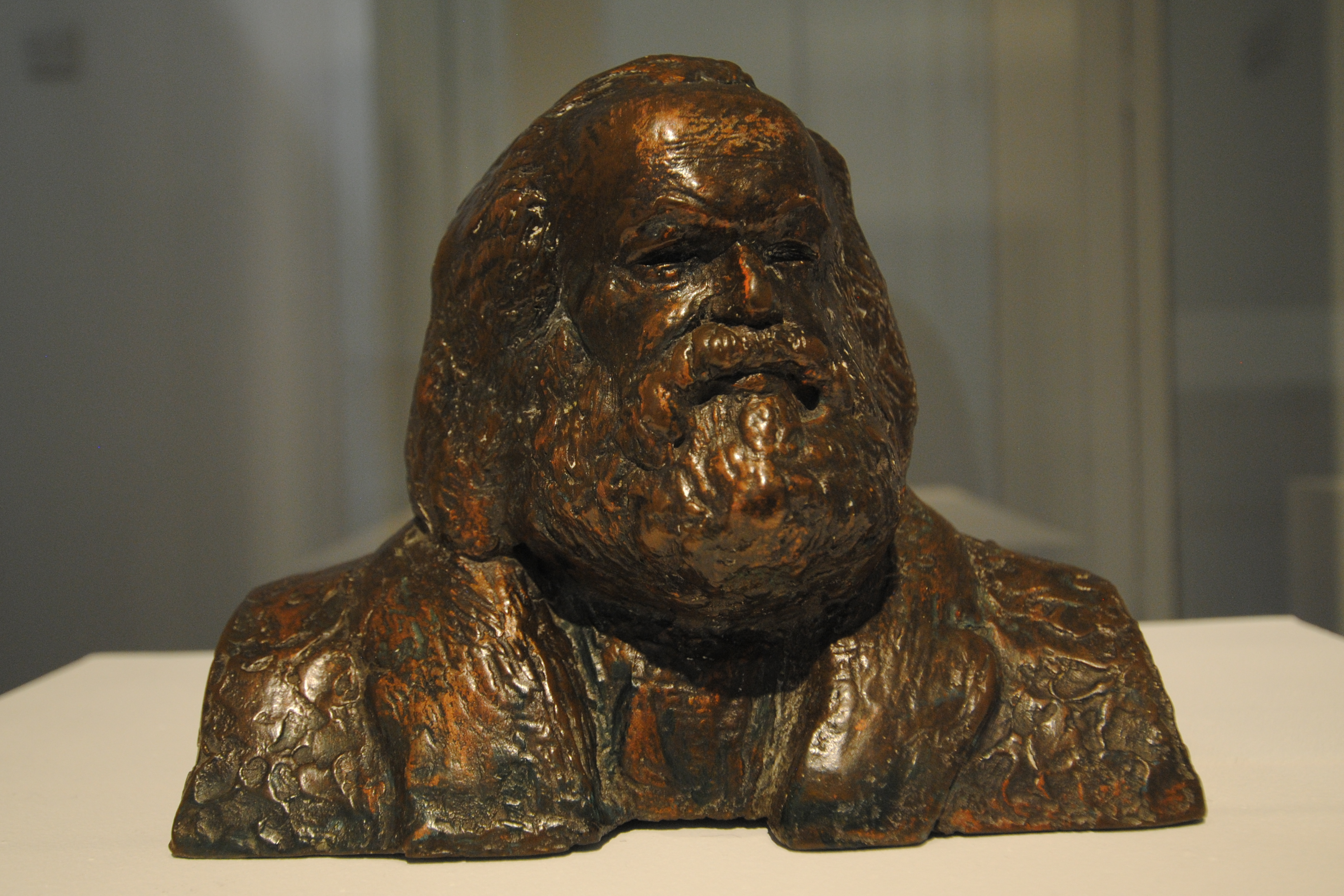
Bradshaw's maquette for the tomb, displayed at the Henry Moore Institute in Leeds

The tomb was designed by Laurence Bradshaw, an artist, sculptor and a member of the Communist Party since the 1930s. On obtaining the commission, Bradshaw wrote that the challenge was to create, "not a monument to a man only but to a great mind and a great philosopher". The tomb comprises a large bronze bust of Marx's head and shoulders, set on a marble plinth.

Bradshaw was responsible for the entire design, including the choice of inscribed texts, and their calligraphy. The texts on the front of the memorial are the closing words of "The Communist Manifesto", "Workers of all lands unite", and those which conclude the Theses on Feuerbach, "The philosophers have only interpreted the world in various ways • the point however is to change it". The sides of the memorial each have three projecting lugs, the top two of which support sculpted wreaths. A central panel records the dates of the births and deaths of Marx, of his wife, of their daughter Eleanor, of their grandson Harry Longuet and of their housekeeper Helene Demuth.

Pevsner, which records the pedestal as being constructed "of granite", describes the head as "colossal". Bradshaw wrote that he wanted the bust to convey the "dynamic force of [Marx's] intellect" and for it to appear at eye-level rather than "towering over the people". The architectural writer Clive Aslet considers the tomb "overwheening" and "the least aesthetically pleasing" monument in Highgate Cemetery. The tomb was listed by Historic England in 1974, and its designation raised to the highest grade, Grade I, in 1999.

== Sources ==
- Aslet, Clive (2005). Landmarks of Britain. London, UK: Hodder & Stoughton. ISBN 978-0-340-73510-7. "editions:O60YB-B7LYMC."
- Cherry, Bridget; Pevsner, Nikolaus (2002). London 4: North. The Buildings of England. New Haven, US & London, UK: Yale University Press. ISBN 978030009-6538.
- Heinrich Gemkow, ed. (1983). Ihre Namen leben durch die Jahrhunderte fort – Kondolenzen und Nekrologe zum Tode von Karl Marx und Friedrich Engels (in German). Berlin: Dietz.
- Shepperd, John (2018). "Who was really at Marx's funeral?" (PDF). Friends of Highgate Cemetery Newsletter.
