= Helene Demuth =

Housekeeper of Karl Marx (1820–1890)

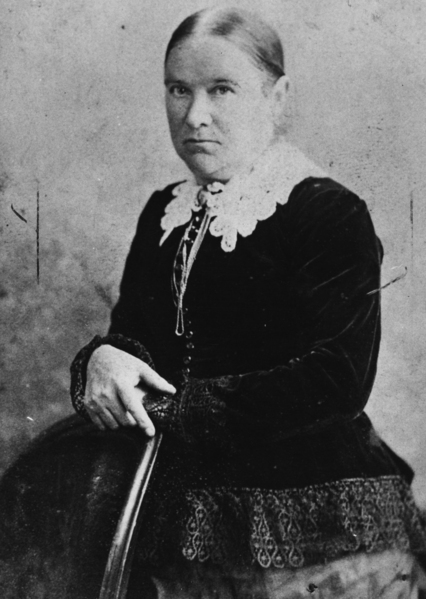
- Born: 30 December 1820; Sankt Wendel, Principality of Lichtenberg, Duchy of Saxe-Coburg-Saalfeld, German Confederation
- Died: 4 November 1890 (aged 69); London, United Kingdom
- Resting place: Highgate Cemetery
- Known for: Housekeeper of Karl Marx, later household manager and political confidante of Frederich Engels

Frederick Lewis Demuth
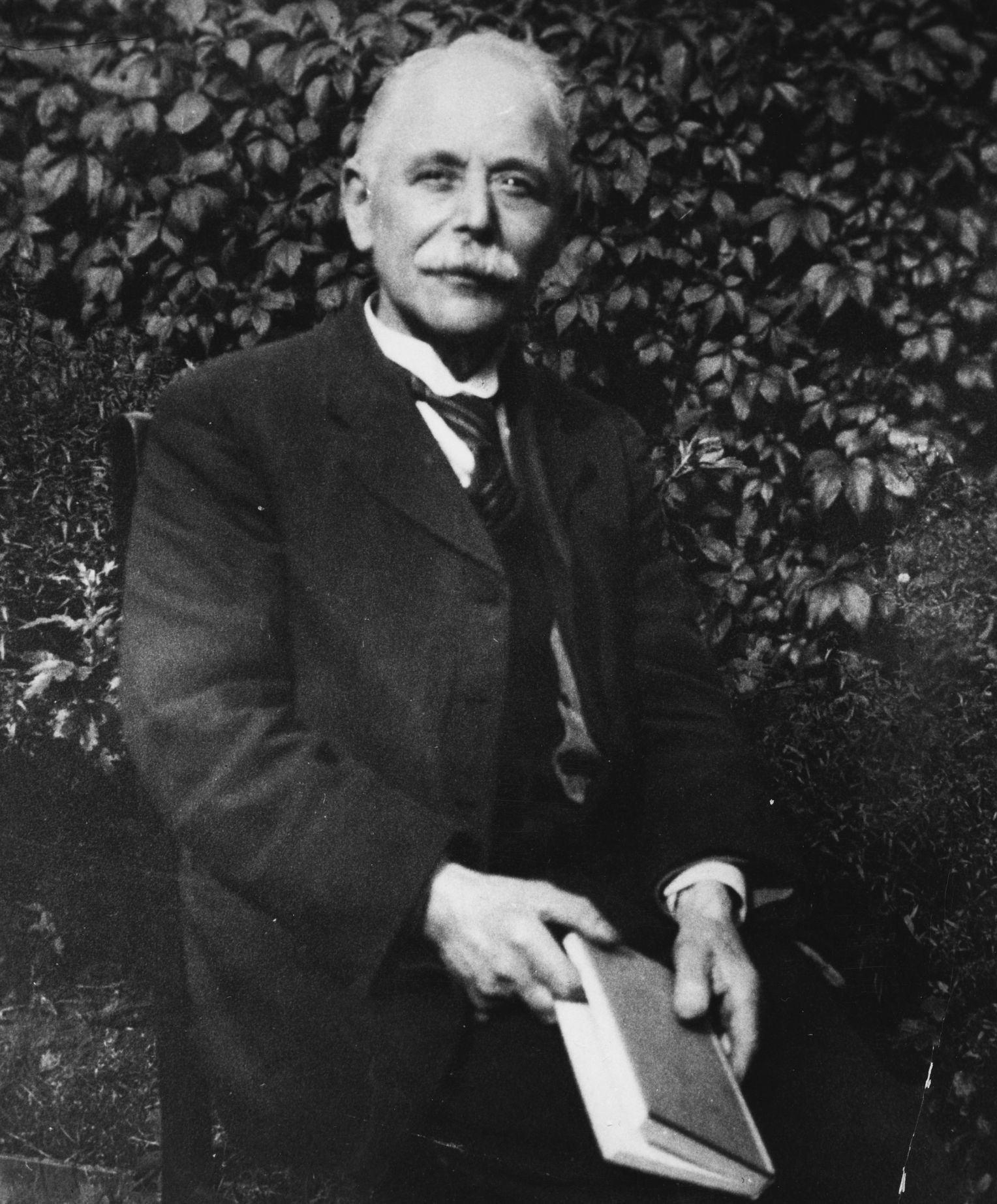
- Born: Henry Frederick Demuth; 23 June 1851; London, United Kingdom
- Died: 28 January 1929 (aged 77); Upper Clapton, London, United Kingdom
- Occupation: Machinist
- Organization: Amalgamated Engineering Union
- Political party: Labour
- Children: 1

Helene or Helena Demuth (30 December 1820 – 4 November 1890) was a German housekeeper who worked for Jenny von Westphalen and Karl Marx, and later served as the household manager and political confidante of Friedrich Engels.

== Biography ==
Helena Demuth was born of peasant parents on 31 December 1820 in Sankt Wendel in today's Saarland. In 1840 Helena and her older sister Katharina worked in Trier as maids, Helena in the von Westphalen household, her sister in the house of a soapmaker two blocks away. They only worked there for about a year, then Katharina got pregnant and both went back to St. Wendel. Helena was living in the house of her mother in Grabenstrasse, St. Wendel in 1843, when Karl Marx married Jenny von Westphalen. Helena joined their household in April 1845 in Brussels, where she was sent by Jenny's mother. She stayed with the Marxes as a lifelong housekeeper, friend, and political confidante, and was commonly known to the family by the nicknames Lenchen or Nim.

After Marx's death in March 1883, Helena Demuth moved to Engels's home, where she ran the household. The pair worked in tandem to organize and arrange for the publication of Marx's literary estate, discovering in the process the manuscript from which Engels was able to reconstruct the second volume of Das Kapital.

In October 1890, Helena was diagnosed with cancer. She died in London on 4 November that year at the age of 69. She was buried in the Marx family grave in accordance with Jenny's wishes, and later re-interred in the tomb of Karl Marx at Highgate Cemetery.

The obituary penned by Engels in The People's Press writes the following: "The leaders of the Socialist movement bore testimony to "her strong common-sense, her absolute rectitude of character, her ceaseless thoughtfulness for others, her reliability, and the essential truthfulness of her nature". Engels at her funeral declared that Marx took counsel of Helena Demuth, not only in difficult and intricate party matters, but even in respect of his economical writings. "As for me," he said, "what work I have been able to do since the death of Marx has been largely due to the sunshine and support of her presence in the house."

=== Frederick Demuth ===
On 23 June 1851 Helene Demuth gave birth to a boy, Henry Frederick Demuth, the birth certificate leaving the name of the father blank. Some scholars accept that the child had been sired by Karl Marx, a view that reflects surviving correspondence from the Marx family and their wider circle, as well as the fact that Marx's wife had been on a trip abroad nine months prior to the birth. The baby was given Friedrich Engels' first name, and family correspondence suggests that Engels, a bachelor living in Manchester and Karl Marx's closest personal friend, claimed fatherhood of the boy. But that correspondence was written years after the actual event by one of Marx's daughters, who knew it from hearsay.

The child's paternity, however, remains a subject of discussion, with the academic Terrell Carver stating that, "Since 1962 it has been claimed that Marx was the father of Helene Demuth's illegitimate son, but this is not well founded on the documentary materials available. From what we know reliably about Marx, he was in his conventional terms a devoted husband and father, perhaps “bourgeois” to the extent that he resisted the complete “proletarianization” of his family. This would have meant grinding employment as well as grinding poverty, the cessation of any cultural advantages for the children, and the end of his career as an “ideas man” for contemporary communism."

Shortly after the birth, the baby, to be known as Frederick Lewis Demuth, was placed with a working class foster family in London named Lewis. He later trained as a toolmaker, and was active in the Amalgamated Engineering Union and a founder member of the Hackney Labour Party. Eleanor Marx, Marx's youngest daughter, came to know Frederick some time after her father's death and made him a family friend.
