= The Difference Between the Democritean and Epicurean Philosophy of Nature =

Doctoral thesis of Karl Marx

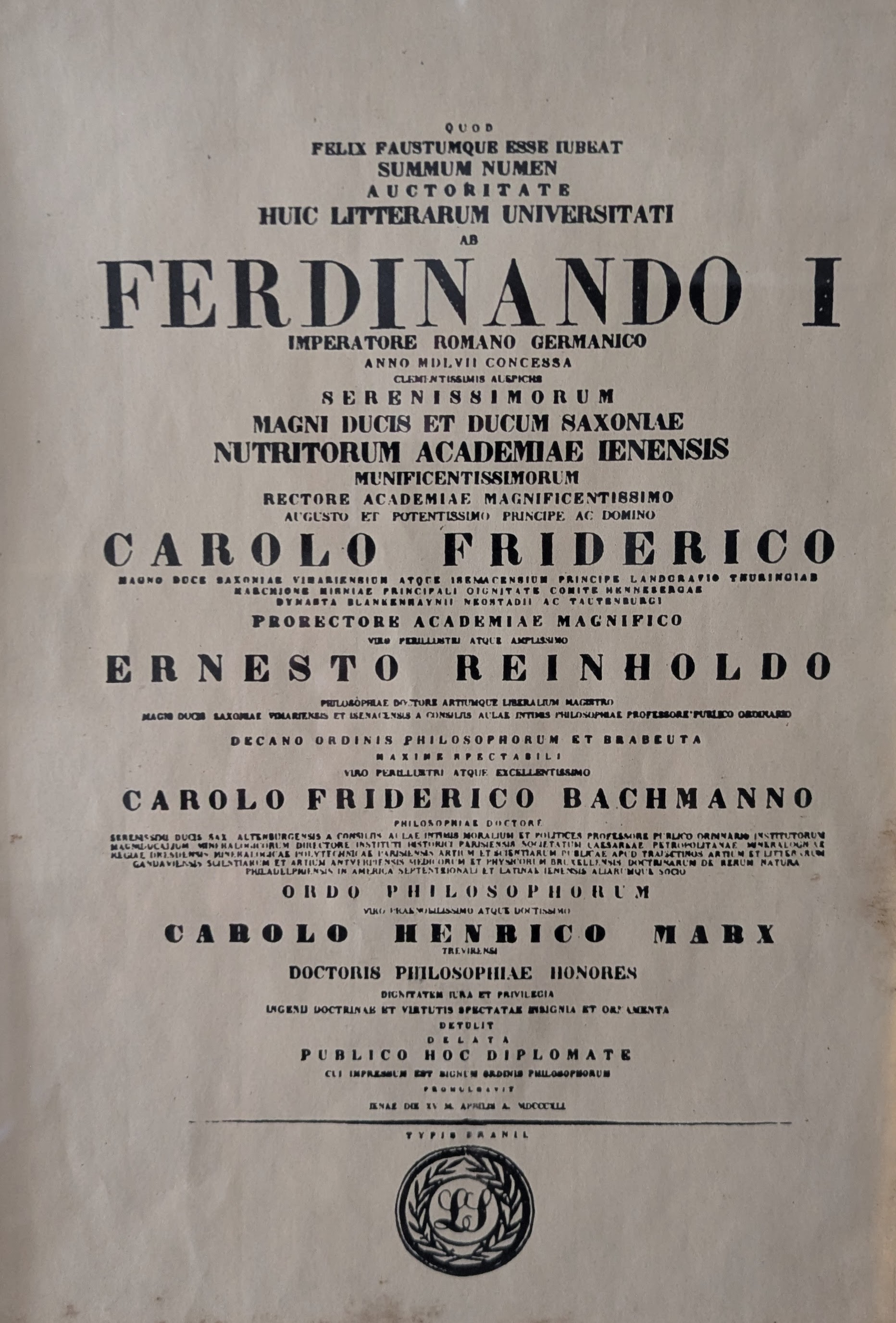
Doctoral certificate for Karl Marx from the University of Jena, April 15, 1841

The Difference Between the Democritean and Epicurean Philosophy of Nature (German: Differenz der demokritischen und epikureischen Naturphilosophie) is a work completed in 1841 by German philosopher Karl Marx as his doctoral dissertation at the University of Jena. The thesis is a comparative study on atomism of Democritus and Epicurus on contingency and dedicated to Marx's friend, mentor, and future father-in-law, Ludwig von Westphalen. Francis Wheen describes it as "a daring and original piece of work in which Marx set out to show that theology must yield to the superior wisdom of philosophy".

== Bibliographic information ==
First published in German in 1902 incomplete in Aus dem Literarischen Nachlass von Karl Marx, Friedrich Engels und Ferdinand Lassalle, Band 1 (Stuttgart : Dietz). The first publication in full was in 1927 in MEGA (1), Erste Abteilung, Band 1, Erster Halbband, p. 1–144. At that time the manuscript was in the archive of the German Social Democratic Party.

The first English translation (only known as a typewritten concept) dates from 1946 and was made by Kurt Karl Merz; it was kept at the Institute of Marxism-Leninism in Moscow.

The foreword to the thesis was published in the collection: K. Marx and F. Engels, On Religion, Moscow, 1957, pp. 13–15.

In 1967 a translation by Norman D. Livergood was published in his Activity in Marx's Philosophy, The Hague, 1967, pp. 55–109.

Two excerpts from the dissertation were published in 1967 in Writings of the Young Marx on Philosophy and Society (New York), pp. 51-66, and in 1971 in Karl Marx. Early Texts (Oxford), pp. 11-22.

An English translation by Dirk Jan Struik and Saly Ruth Struik was published in MECW, vol 1, p. 25-107.

== Sources ==
- Marx, Karl; Engels, Friedrich (2010). Volume 1: Karl Marx 1835-43. Marx & Engels Collected Works. London: Lawrence & Wishart. ISBN 978-1-84327-945-7. (online available via Internet Archive and via libcom.org)
- Wheen, Francis (2001). Karl Marx. London: Fourth Estate. ISBN 978-1-85702-637-5.
