= Laurence Bradshaw =

English sculptor, printmaker and artist (1899–1978)

- Laurence Bradshaw sculpting the bust for the Tomb of Karl Marx in Highgate Cemetery
- Born: Laurence Henderson Bradshaw; 11 March 1899; Chester, Cheshire, England
- Died: 1 April 1978 (aged 79)
- Education: Liverpool College of Art
- Occupation: Master of the Art Workers' Guild (1958)
- Known for: Creating the Tomb of Karl Marx in Highgate Cemetery. Official war artist for the Norwegian government during WWII. Fellow of the Royal Society of Sculptors
- Political party: Communist Party of Great Britain (CPGB)

Laurence Henderson Bradshaw (11 March 1899 – 1 April 1978) was an English sculptor, printmaker, and artist. He was a lifelong socialist and joined the Communist Party of Great Britain (CPGB) in the 1930s, remaining a member for the rest of his life.

Bradshaw is most famous for being the sculptor who created the bust of Karl Marx for the Tomb of Karl Marx in Highgate Cemetery. During his career, he also painted posters for Transport London, the Spanish International Brigades, the British-Soviet Friendship Society, and the Marx Memorial Library.

== Early life and career ==
Laurence Henderson Bradshaw was born in Chester in 1899. He attended Liverpool College of Art and completed his studies in painting and sculpting in London.

He began his artistic career in the 1920s by assisting Welsh artist Frank Brangwyn. Bradshaw quickly became prolific, demonstrating his wide variety of artistic talents. In the 1930s he undertook a number of public works, including sculpting the decorations for Worthing Town Hall (1933–34), and a stone relief depicting a mother and child for Oxford's Radcliffe Maternity ward (1935), which is today located within the Radcliffe Primary Care Building. As his skills and fame increased, he was commissioned to create posters for London Transport from 1935 to 1937 to promote the rural green line bus services.

During the Spanish Civil War, Bradshaw produced artworks in support of the anti-fascist forces of the International Brigades. One of these works was a hand-painted banner memorialising two International Brigade volunteers—W. Langman and A. Bird—who had died in Spain, alongside 19 other volunteers with the caption, "Hammersmith Communist Party Sends Greetings to Comrades Fighting in Spain".

== Second World War film-making ==
Fresh from creating Spanish Civil War artworks, Bradshaw became an official war artist for the Norwegian government during the Second World War. Having studied film with Soviet filmmaker Sergei Eisenstein, Bradshaw produced three wartime propaganda movies for the Ministry of Information. For his services to British information services in WWII, he was awarded a civil pension from the British government.

During the war, the Nazis bombed Bradshaw's art studio, destroying many of the records of his earlier works.

== Later career ==
=== Creation of Karl Marx's tomb ===
Bradshaw's most famous work is his sculpture for the Tomb of Karl Marx, erected in London's Highgate Cemetery. In 1955, Bradshaw won the commission to design the tomb, which was unveiled at a ceremony in 1956. It was attended by the leader of the Communist Party of Great Britain (CPGB), Harry Pollitt, the socialist singer and black civil rights activist Paul Robeson, the Soviet Union's British ambassador, and the scientist J. D. Bernal who was president of the Marx Memorial Library.

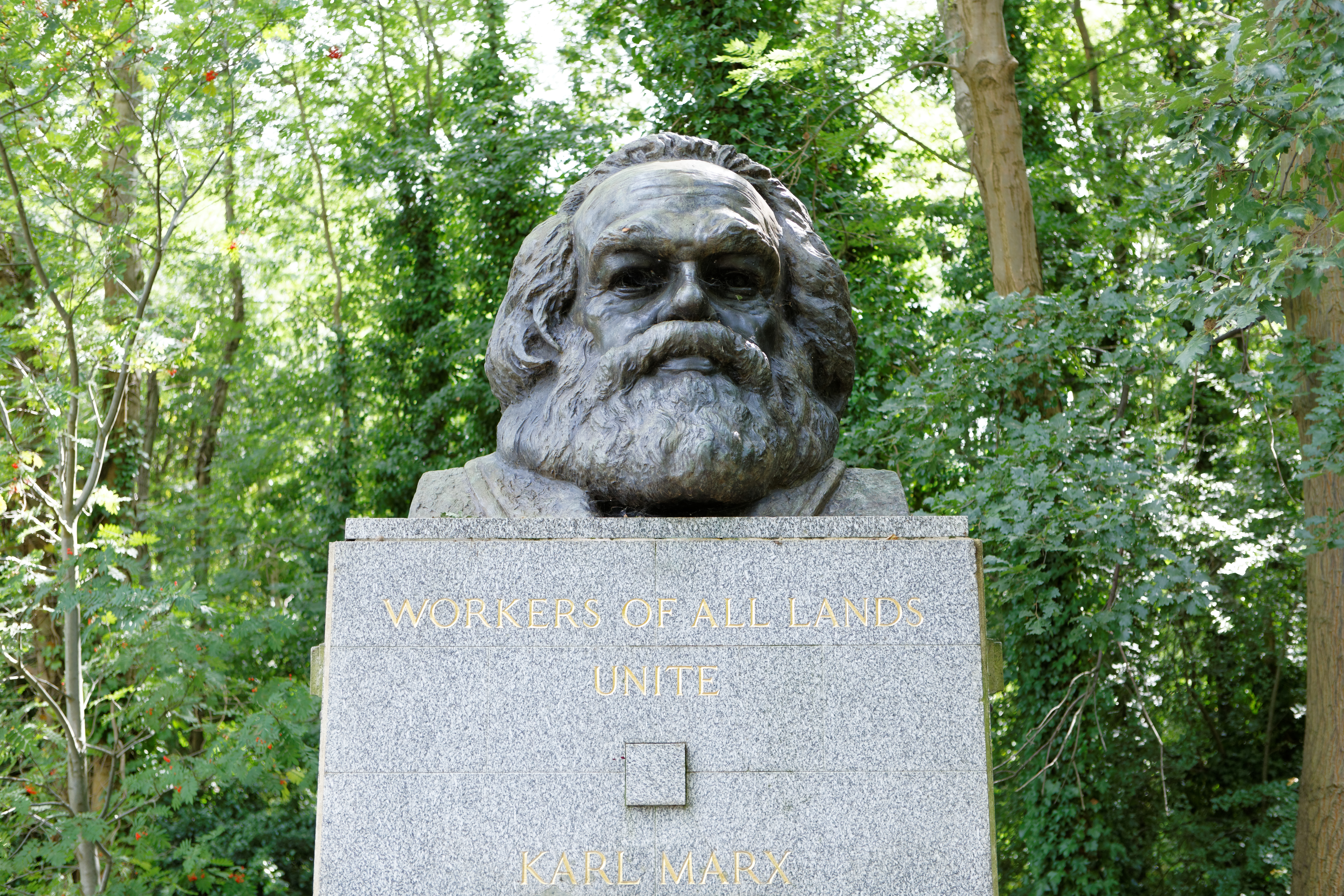
Tomb of Karl Marx, by Laurence Bradshaw

Bradshaw designed every element of the Tomb of Karl Marx, including the bust, the plinth, and the calligraphy of the texts on the monument, but he did not sign his finished work. He considered that his design must be "...not a monument to a man only but to a great mind and a great philosopher."

The tomb was designated a Grade I listed monument in 1974.

=== Other achievements ===
During his later career, Bradshaw was elected the Master of the Art Workers' Guild in 1958, and was also made a Fellow of the Royal Society of British Sculptors. Other notable communist figures that Bradshaw sculpted included the African-American scholar and activist W. E. B. Du Bois, the Trinidadian musician and actor Edric Connor, the Scottish poet Hugh MacDiarmid, and the British communist leader Harry Pollitt.

Bradshaw eventually became the chair of the British Soviet Friendship Society (BSFS) when Andrew Rothstein was the BSFS's president. Bradshaw created numerous artworks and illustrations for the BSFS, including the front cover of their journal in 1970 commemorating Vladimir Lenin.

In 1970, Bradshaw created a Lenin sculpture in the main hall of the Marx Memorial Library. This bronze relief was unveiled on 22 April 1970 and was inscribed with the words:

"1870–1924. LENIN. In this house, then the British Social Democrat's ‘Twentieth Century Press’, Lenin, leader of the victorious October Revolution, edited Iskra, the first all-Russian socialist newspaper, in 1902–3."

== Death and legacy ==
Laurence Henderson Bradshaw died on 1 April 1978. He was 79.

After Bradshaw's death, Andrew Rothstein paid tribute to him, praising his work and character:

“That same profound sympathy with the wretched and the exploited; his vigorous revolt against the conditions which condemned the human race to poverty and war, brought him very many years ago to Socialism and to a consistent and unfaltering Marxism…it was Laurence Bradshaw who put first into the small model, then into the plaster enlargement from which the bronze head was cast, into every line and massive detail of the whole work, his own passionate comprehension of Marx's supreme intelligence and indomitable resolution”.

Archival information for researchers regarding the life and activities of Laurence Bradshaw can be found at the Henry Moore Institute Archive in Leeds.

== See also ==
- Pablo Picasso
- Rutland Boughton
- Alec Wainman
- British Battalion
- Noreen Branson
