= Natalie Rothstein =

British curator and writer (1930–2010)

- Born: Natalie Katherine Anne Rothstein; 21 June 1930; East Finchley, England
- Died: 18 February 2010 (aged 79)
- Occupations: Curator, academic, and fashion historian
- Father: Andrew Rothstein

Natalie Katherine Anne Rothstein (21 June 1930 – 18 February 2010) was a curator and academic. She held the post of curator of silks at the Victoria and Albert Museum, having worked there for 38 years. She also wrote and edited numerous works on textiles including 400 Years of Fashion (1988).

== Early life and education ==
Rothstein was born in East Finchley, North London to father Andrew Rothstein and mother Edith Lunn. Her father was of Russian-Jewish parentage, while on her maternal side, she descended from Lancashire-born, Michael Lunn, who managed the Balashika factory.

Rothstein attended Camden School for Girls and graduated with a degree in Modern History from St Hilda's College, Oxford. During her time at Oxford, she was a member of the Socialist Club. She later obtained a Master of Arts (MA) from a university in London.

== Career ==
Rothstein joined the Victoria and Albert Museum (V&A) in 1952 and joined the Textiles Department in 1955, where she became acquainted with Peter Thornton, who introduced her to the museum's collection of 18th-century silks.

== Personal life ==
Rothstein had been cured of lung cancer through surgery and became an opponent of smoking.

Rothstein retired to the Chilterns.

== Bibliography ==
=== Books ===
- Silk Designs of the Eighteenth Century in the Collection of the Victoria and Albert Museum (1990)
- Woven Textile Design in Britain to 1750 (1992)
- Woven Textile Design in Britain from 1750 to 1850 (1994)

=== Edited volumes ===
- Textiles and Dress (1978)
- 400 Years of Fashion (1983)
- From East to West; Textiles from G.P. & J. Baker (1984)
- Barbara Johnson's Album of Fashion and Fabric (1987)

=== Select contributions ===
- "The Importance of the Huguenots in the London Silk Industry" in Proceedings of the Huguenot Society in London (1959)
- "Tissue" in Bulletin du Centre Internationale d’Etude des Textiles Anciens (1960)
- "Huguenot Silks" in Proceedings of the Huguenot Society in London (1962)
- "A History of British Textile Design" in Textile Collections of the World (1976), edited by Cecil Lubell
- "Rococo in Textile Design" and "Silk Design" in Rococo: Art and Design in Hogarth's England (1984)
