= Theses on Feuerbach =

Philosophical notes by Karl Marx

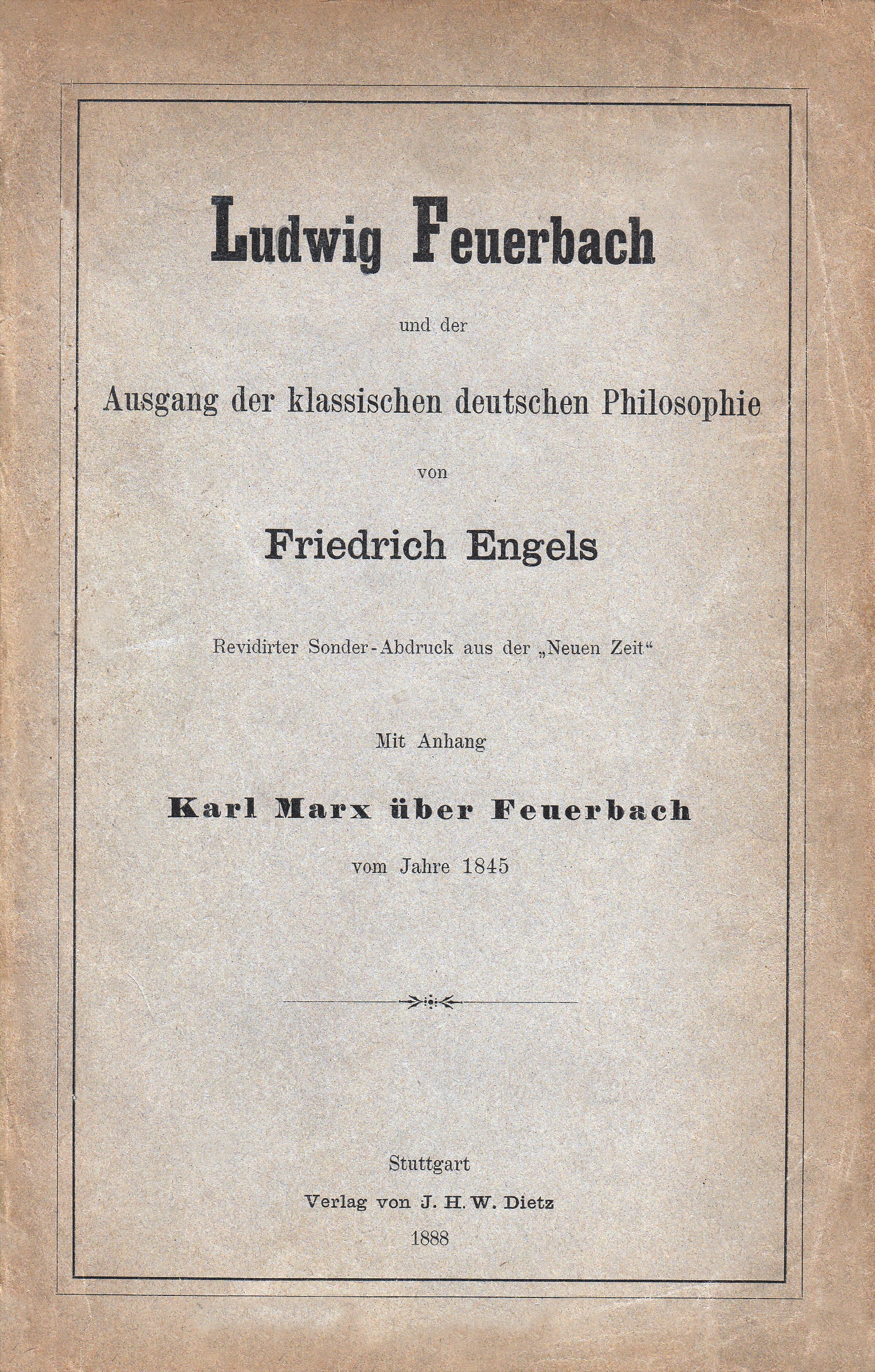
Cover of the pamphlet in which Marx's "Theses on Feuerbach" were first published in 1888

The Theses on Feuerbach are eleven short philosophical notes written by Karl Marx as a basic outline for the first chapter of the book The German Ideology in 1845. Like the book for which they were written, the theses were never published in Marx's lifetime, seeing print for the first time in 1888 as an appendix to a pamphlet by his co-thinker Friedrich Engels. The document is best remembered for its epigrammatic 11th and final thesis, "Philosophers have only interpreted the world, in various ways; the point, however, is to change it", which is engraved on Marx's tomb.

== Background ==
In February 1845 Karl Marx was deported from France at the behest of minister of foreign affairs François Guizot. Marx found sanctuary in Brussels, where he was joined for a number of months by his political compatriot Friedrich Engels beginning in April of that same year. It was in Brussels that Marx first began to shape the concept of historical materialism—the idea that underlying fundamental changes in political history was a corresponding economic struggle between ruling and oppressed classes which was at root of these structural transformations.

Marx began work upon a book detailing his new philosophy of history, entitled The German Ideology. In connection with this project, Marx wrote a terse 11-point set of observations and epigrams regarding the ideas of Ludwig Feuerbach. Feuerbach was a fellow Young Hegelian who Marx regarded as the most modern exponent of materialism, although Marx believed Feuerbach had not drawn fully satisfactory political conclusions from his philosophical insights. These "theses" were initially written as a raw outline for the first chapter of The German Ideology, and most of these were developed at greater length in that work.

== Content ==
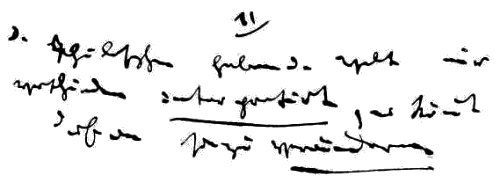
The iconic 11th thesis on Feuerbach as it appears in the original German manuscript

Marx sharply criticized the contemplative materialism of the Young Hegelians, viewing "the essence of man" in isolation and abstraction, instead arguing that the nature of man could only be understood in the context of his economic and social relations. Marx argued that understanding the origins of religious belief were not enough in moving towards its elimination; instead declaring that it was the underlying social and economic structure which gave rise to religious belief and that it was a transformation of this which was a necessary precondition to the elimination of religion.

The Theses identify political action as the only truth of philosophy, famously concluding: "Philosophers have hitherto only interpreted the world in various ways; the point is to change it." While the text wishes to retain the critical stance of German critical idealism, it transposes that criticism into practical, material, political terms.

== Publication history ==
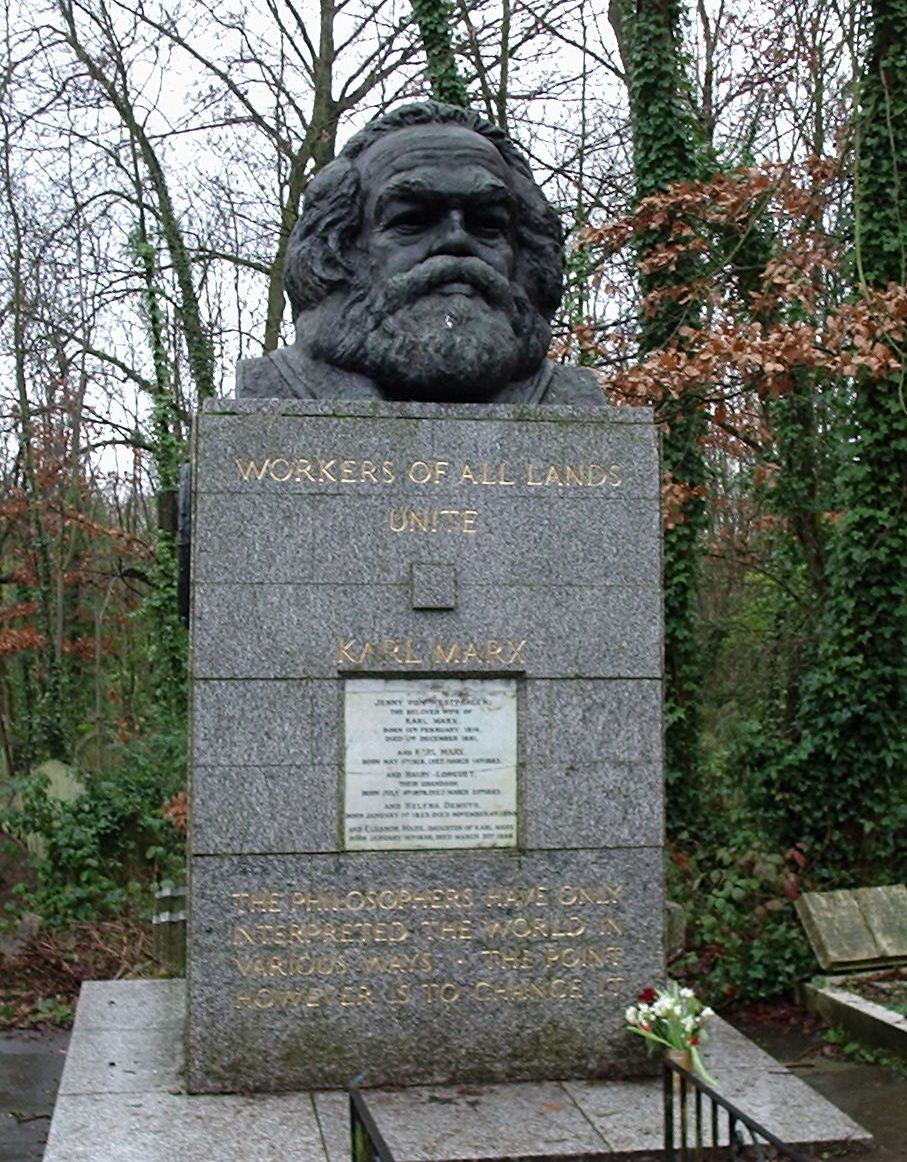
The final thesis on Feuerbach also appears on Marx's tomb.

Despite their best efforts to find a publisher, The German Ideology was not published during the lifetime of either Marx or Engels. The polemical work was finally published in full only in 1932 by the Marx–Engels–Lenin Institute of the Central Committee of the All-Union Communist Party in Moscow.

Nor did Marx publish the Theses on Feuerbach during his lifetime. This material was instead later edited by Friedrich Engels and published in February 1888 as a supplement to his pamphlet Ludwig Feuerbach and the End of Classical German Philosophy. Marx's original unedited text was published only in 1924 in German and Russian translation as part of Marx–Engels Archives, Book I, by the Marx–Engels Institute in Moscow.

== Uses of the text ==
The Eleventh Thesis on Feuerbach — "Philosophers have hitherto only interpreted the world in various ways; the point is to change it" — was used by Sergey Prokofiev in his Cantata for the 20th Anniversary of the October Revolution, Op. 74.

The Eleventh Thesis is engraved in the entryway of Humboldt University on Unter den Linden in Berlin. The Socialist Unity Party of Germany ordered this in 1953 as part of reconstruction following World War II.

The Eleventh Thesis is also Marx's epitaph, engraved on his tombstone in Highgate Cemetery in London, along with the final line of the Communist Manifesto, "Workers of All Lands, Unite".

Whittaker Chambers (fluent in German and translator of the 1928 English-language version of Bambi) published his own translation in his 1952 memoir Witness: "Philosophers have explained the world; it is necessary to change the world."

== See also ==
- Young Marx
- Marxism
- Marxist philosophy
- Young Hegelians
- German idealism
- Praxis (process)
- Materialism
- August Cieszkowski
