= Ludwig von Westphalen =

Prussian aristocrat (1770–1842)

- Born: 11 July 1770; Bornum am Elm, Holy Roman Empire
- Died: 3 March 1842 (aged 71); Trier, German Confederation
- Education: Collegium Carolinum
- Occupations: Government official, aristocrat
- Title: Edler
- Spouses: Elisabeth von Veltheim (m. 1797; died 1807) Karoline Heubel (m. 1812)
- Children: 7, including Ferdinand, Edgar, and Jenny
- Relatives: Eleanor Marx (granddaughter); Jenny Marx Longuet (granddaughter); Laura Marx (granddaughter)

Johann Ludwig von Westphalen (11 July 1770 – 3 March 1842) was a liberal Prussian civil servant and the father-in-law of Karl Marx.

== Biography ==
=== Early life ===
Johann Ludwig von Westphalen was born on 11 July 1770 in Bornum am Elm. He was the youngest son of Philipp von Westphalen (1724–92), who himself was the son of a Blankenburg postmaster. Philipp von Westphalen had been ennobled in 1764 with the predicate Edler von Westphalen by Duke Ferdinand of Brunswick for his military services. He had served as the duke's de facto "chief of staff" during the Seven Years' War. Through his mother, Jane Wishart of Pittarrow, he was the descendant of many Scottish and European noble families.

He received extensive education and spoke German and English, and read Latin, Greek, Italian, French and Spanish. He studied at the Collegium Carolinum, the forerunner of today's Braunschweig University of Technology, and at Göttingen.

=== Career ===
In 1794, he entered government's service in Brunswick. In 1797 he married Elisabeth von Veltheim, who bore him four children. In 1804 he entered the government service of the Duchy of Brunswick and Lunenburg (Wolfenbüttel).

With the establishment of the Napoleonic state in Westphalia (the Kingdom of Westphalia) in 1807, he entered its service. He was likely motivated in this by a desire to see reforms carried out. He did, however, oppose the French dominance of the local government, and other policies, and for his critique he was eventually arrested by orders from Louis-Nicolas Davout and imprisoned in the fortress of Gifhorn. In the same year, he lost his first wife. In the summer of 1809 Louis was appointed sub-prefect of Salzwedel, where three years later in 1812 he married Karoline Heubel; they had three children. After Salzwedel was again under Prussian administration, in 1816 Ludwig von Westphalen was transferred to the newly established regional government in Trier.

=== Personal life ===
It was in Trier that he met and befriended Heinrich Marx, the father of Karl Marx. The children of the respective families, in particular Jenny and Edgar von Westphalen, and Sophie and Karl Marx, became close friends as well. In 1836, Jenny von Westphalen and Karl Marx became engaged; at first secretly but Ludwig approved the marriage in 1837, even though some saw Marx, who was both middle class and younger than her, as well as of Jewish descent, as an inappropriate partner for the noble daughter. In fact, Ludwig was seen as the mentor and role model of Karl Marx, who referred to him as a "dear fatherly friend". Ludwig filled Marx with enthusiasm for the romantic school and read him Homer and Shakespeare, who remained Marx's favorite authors all his life. Marx also read Voltaire and Racine with Ludwig. Ludwig devoted much of his time to the young Marx and the two went for intellectual walks through "the hills and woods" of the neighbourhood. It was Ludwig who first introduced Marx to the personality and socialist teachings of Saint-Simon. Marx dedicated his doctoral thesis "The Difference Between the Democritean and Epicurean Philosophy of Nature" written in 1841 to Ludwig in a most effusive manner in which Marx wrote "You, my fatherly friend, have always been for me the living proof that idealism is no illusion, but the true reality" In 1842, Marx was present at the deathbed of Ludwig von Westphalen. Jenny and Karl became married in 1843, a year after Ludwig's death.

He was the father of Ferdinand von Westphalen, a conservative and reactionary Prussian Minister of the Interior.

=== Death ===
He died on 3 March 1842 in Trier.
