= Ferdinand von Westphalen =

German politician (1799–1876)

- Born: Ferdinand Otto Wilhelm Henning von Westphalen; 23 April 1799; Lubeck
- Died: 2 July 1876 (aged 77); Alter St.-Matthäus-Kirchhof
- Parent(s): Ludwig von Westphalen; Elisabeth von Veltheim
- Relatives: Edgar von Westphalen (half-brother); Jenny von Westphalen (half-sister)

Ferdinand Otto Wilhelm Henning von Westphalen (April 23, 1799 – July 2, 1876) was a German politician and the Interior Minister of Prussia in the reaction era 1850–1858.

== Life ==
Westphalen was born in Lubeck. He is the son of Ludwig von Westphalen and his first wife Elisabeth von Veltheim. He studied from 1816 to 1819 at the universities of Halle, Göttingen and Berlin.

He held various administrative positions, including district administrator and government councilor. In 1850, he became the Prussian Interior Minister and also served as interim Minister for Agricultural Affairs at the suggestion of Ludwig Friedrich Leopold von Gerlach. Westphalen restored Provincial Estates, despite constitutional concerns. His tenure saw opposition from Otto Theodor von Manteuffel. Upon Prince Wilhelm's regency, Westphalen left his ministerial role.

Despite their political differences, he remained on amicable terms with the couple formed by the marriage of his half-sister Jenny von Westphalen to Karl Marx.

He died in 1876 and was buried at Alter St.-Matthäus-Kirchhof.

== Family ==
- Edgar von Westphalen, half-brother
- Jenny von Westphalen, half-sister, Karl Marx's wife
