= Léo Wanner =

French communist and anti-imperialist activist (1886–1941)

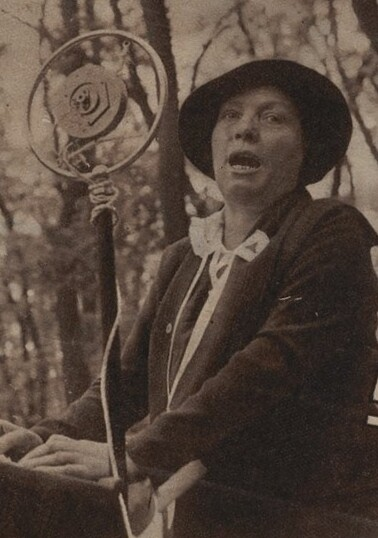
- Léo Wanner speaking at an anti-fascist rally in 1934
- Born: Léonie Joséphine Berger; 5 January 1886; Bourg-en-Bresse, Ain, France
- Died: 5 November 1941 (aged 55); 5th arrondissement of Paris, France
- Resting place: Ivry Cemetery
- Occupations: Activist; journalist
- Organizations: Women's International League for Peace and Freedom; League Against Imperialism and Colonial Oppression
- Political party: French Section of the Workers' International; French Communist Party

Léo Wanner, née Léonie Joséphine Berger (5 January 1886 – 5 November 1941), was a French communist, anti-fascist, and anti-imperialist activist and journalist. Wanner led the French division of the League Against Imperialism and Colonial Oppression and opposed the colonial occupations of Algeria, Tunisia, and Morocco through her activism and reporting.

== Biography ==
=== Early life ===
Léo Wanner was born in 1886 in Bourg-en-Bresse; both of her parents were gardeners. Her first marriage to Jean Faudrin ended in divorce, and later she married an engineer named Arthur Wanner. Léo Wanner and her second husband had an equal relationship, which was not common for that time.

=== Political activism ===
In July 1925, Wanner joined the French section of the Workers' International (SFIO). She participated in feminist demonstrations in Lyon, but she was frustrated by her fellow members, who she believed were too bourgeoise and lacked solidarity with working class women. She also criticized these members for talking about women's suffrage in private, but, in public, supporting existing social structures and being too timid to debate or agitate for change. Ultimately, she moved to Paris in 1928 with her husband, hoping for more political engagement.

Wanner joined the French section of the Women's International League for Peace and Freedom, or the Ligue internationale des femmes pour la paix et la liberté (LIFPL). She became a member of the organization's executive committee and started an affiliated yet independent journal called SOS Informations in 1930. She passionately argued her positions in LIFPL debates, which caused conflicts within the organization. In 1927, she supported an LIFPL resolution to condemn Western aggression toward the USSR. In another debate in 1932, she argued that the organization should officially declare their support for China over Japan in the Sino-Japanese conflict, despite calls from other LIFPL members to maintain neutrality.

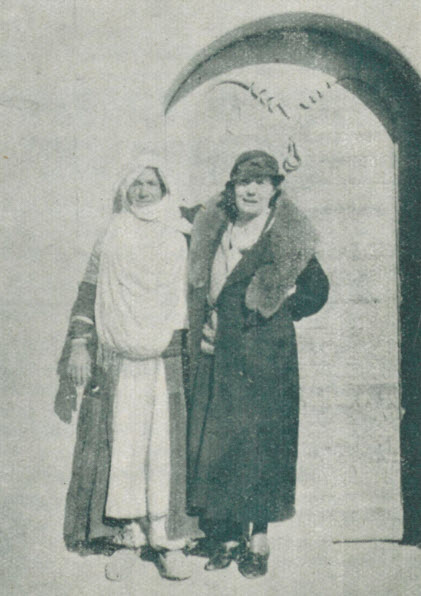
Léo Wanner (right) in Syria in 1934

In 1932, Wanner led the French division of the League Against Imperialism and Colonial Oppression. The following year, in June 1933, she joined a commission by the Comité mondial des femmes contre la guerre et le fascisme (transl. World Committee for Women Against War and Fascism) to investigate the "pacification" of the Moroccan people. In her study, published in L'Humanité and Monde, she condemned the Banque de Paris et des Pays-Bas for profiting from military operations in Morocco. Her writing humanized the Moroccan nationalists and criticized the repression of their movement, which was unique in the French press at the time.

In May 1934, Wanner spoke at anti-fascist rallies in Vincennes and Cirque d'Hiver. In September of that same year, she started a committee in the LIFPL to help victims of poverty and oppression in Tunisia. Later in November, Wanner published an article in Les femmes dans l'action mondiale describing the colonial government's starvation and violent armed repression of the Tunisian people, and she called for readers to support resistance against French imperialism in Tunisia. Throughout 1934 and 1935, Wanner took part in several meetings in Paris that connected Algerian, Moroccan, and Tunisian activists with communist and socialist organizations, including the French Communist Party and the SFIO.

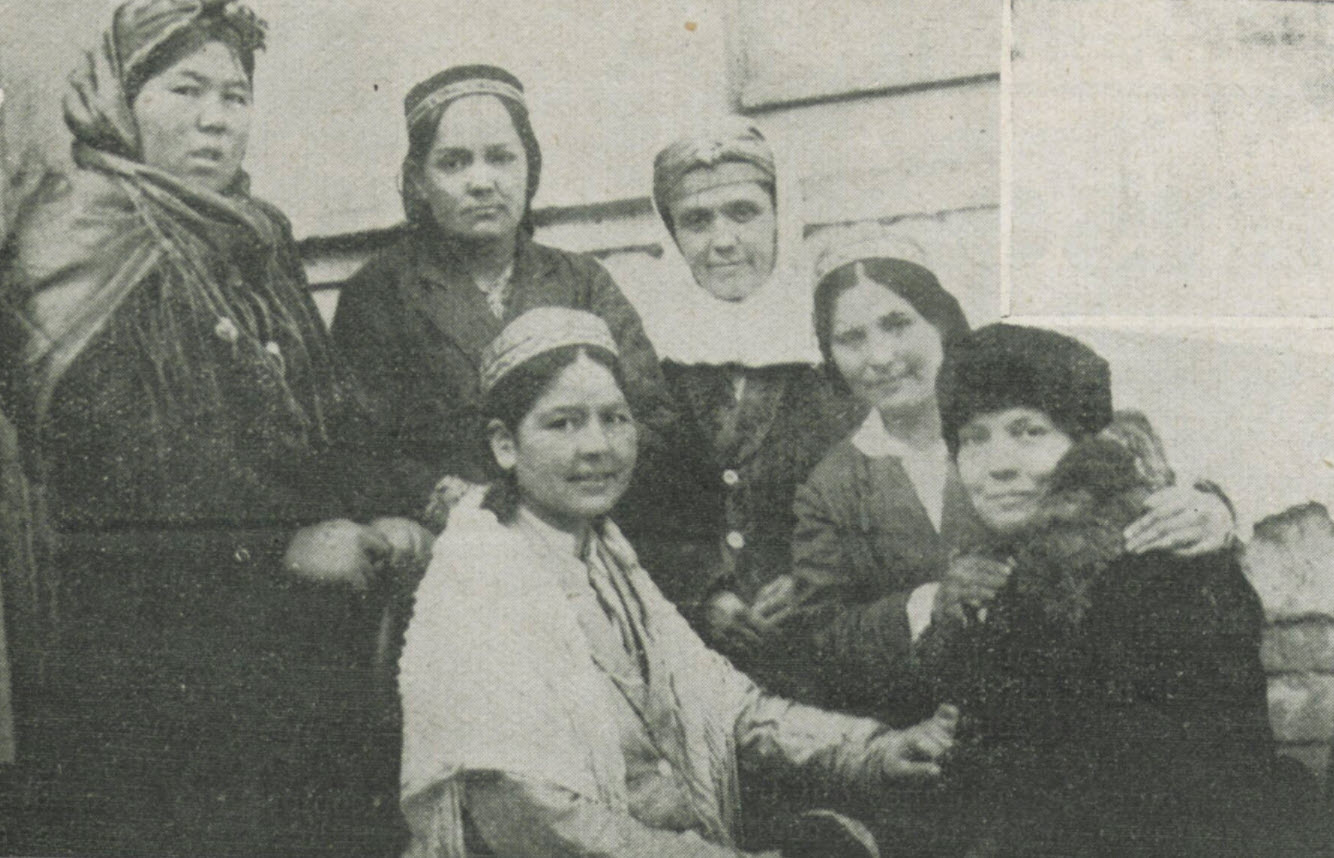
Léo Wanner with Uzbek delegates at the 5th Congress of Soviets in Tashkent in 1935

In March 1936, she met Shakib Arslan in Geneva. Wanner traveled to North Africa with Robert-Jean Longuet, the great-grandson of Karl Marx, to meet with leaders of independence movements. In August 1936, she and Longuet met with Mohamed Hassan Ouazzani in Fes, in what was then the Spanish Protectorate of Morocco, to coordinate an anti-Francoist resistance with the Comité d'action marocaine (transl. Committee for Moroccan Action).

Wanner served as secretary of the Comité international pour la défense du peuple éthiopien et de la paix (transl. International Committee for the Defense of the Ethiopian People and the Peace).

=== Death ===
Wanner died on 5 November 1941 at her home in Paris. She is buried in Ivry Cemetery.
