= Simone Boisecq =

French sculptor (1922–2012)

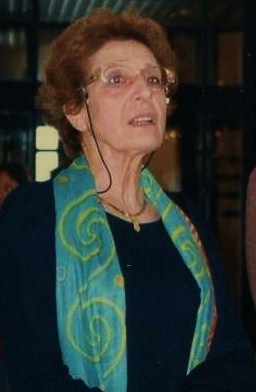
- Boisecq in 1997
- Born: April 7, 1922; Algiers, Algeria
- Died: August 6, 2012 (aged 90); Auray, France
- Education: University of Algiers
- Known for: Sculpture, drawing
- Spouse: Karl-Jean Longuet

Simone Boisecq (April 7, 1922 - August 6, 2012) was a French sculptor who worked in Algiers and Paris. Her work has been described as a synthesis between abstraction and figuration.

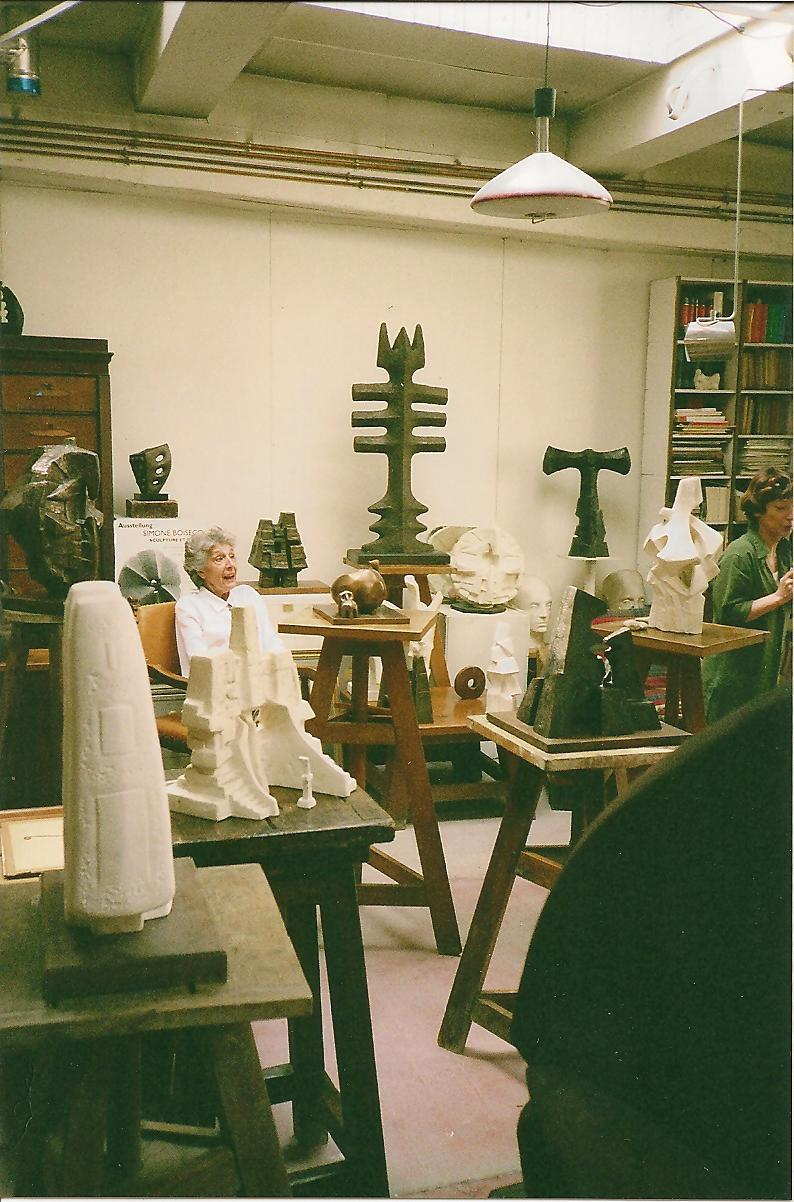
Studio of Simone Boisecq in 1998

== Early life and education ==
Boisecq was born in Algiers to Émile Boisecq and Suzanne Deferre on April 7, 1922. Her father was from Brittany, Vannes, and had moved to Algiers in 1920. He was a liberal Catholic who worked as a military administrator and supported the cultural and national causes of the Bretons. Additionally, he supported the Romani people, Kabyles, Arabs, and Indigenous peoples of the Americas. He held an interest in primitive art (such as Breton art), collected works of African art, as well as made art himself and wrote poetry.

Boisecq's mother, Suzanne Deferre (b. 1898 in Izmir), was raised in a convent orphanage. She made her living giving piano lessons in Constantinople, and moved to Algiers in 1920. She began working in administration where she met her future husband whom she married in 1921. After the birth of Simone Boisecq the following year, she left her job in administration and resumed teaching piano. The Boisecq family lived west of Algiers in the La Consolation neighborhood.

In 1929, Simone was presented with the gift of a Dogon sculpture from her father that had been purchased at the Chartres market.

As a student at the Lycée Delacroix (now the Lycée Aroudj & Kheiredine Barbarous) she began reading the works of Paul Claudel and André Gide. Three years later, in 1937, she attending drawing classes with Henri Laitier, and took sculpture classes at the Beaux Arts in Algiers, receiving her bachelors degree in 1940. The following year she studies aesthetics and philosophy at the University of Algiers.

== Career ==
Boisecq was a journalist for the Agence France-Presse before devoting herself to art. Her early aesthetic influences were primitive art, the landscapes of Algeria and Brittany, and her admiration and friendships with surrealist poets and painters. As a young artist with a rising career in Paris, Boisecq established friendships with Brancusi, Picasso and Zadkine. She received critical praise for her work by the artist Germaine Richier in 1956. Her work has been described a synthesis between abstraction and figuration.

Boisecq has exhibited her work widely. Between 1999 and 2001, retrospective exhibitions of her work were presented in France, Germany, and Portugal. Between 2011 and 2013, a traveling exhibition of Boisecq and Karl-Jean Longuet's works, titled From sculpture to the dreamed city, was presented at the Musée des Beaux-Arts de Reims, at the Musée de l'Évêché de Limoges, at the Musée Sainte-Croix of Poitiers and at the Musée Unterlinden of Colmar.

A monograph of her work, Simone Boiscq: La Période Sauvage (1946–1960) was published in 2018. In 2021, an exhibition of her and Longuet's work was presented in Auray, along with an accompanying book.

== Collections ==
Boisecq's works are found in numerous museum collections, including the Musée des Beaux-Arts d'Agen; Musée Unterlinden Musée des Beaux-Arts de Dijon; Centre Pompidou, among others.

== Personal life and death ==
In 1946, she met Karl-Jean Longuet, also a sculptor, who was great grandson of Karl Marx.

She died on August 6, 2012, and is buried in the Père-Lachaise Cemetery in Paris.

== See also ==
- Simone Boisecq on French Wikipedia

== Sources ==
- Longuet Marx, Anne (2022). Le Soleil et l'envol, À la rencontre de Simone Boisecq et Karl-Jean Longuet, sculpteurs (in French). Paris: L'atelier contemporain.
