= Edgar von Westphalen =

Communist politician, early Texas settler (1819–1890)

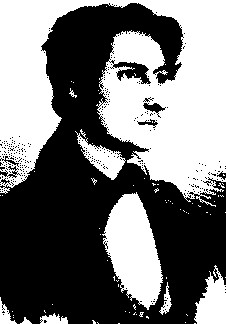
- Born: Edgar Gerhard Julius Oscar Ludwig von Westphalen; 26 March 1819; Trier
- Died: 30 September 1890 (aged 71)
- Occupations: writer, politician
- Parent(s): Ludwig von Westphalen; Caroline Heubel
- Relatives: Jenny von Westphalen (sister); Ferdinand von Westphalen (half brother)

Edgar Gerhard Julius Oscar Ludwig von Westphalen (26 March 1819 – 30 September 1890) was a German writer and Communist politician, who was also a long-time friend and brother-in-law of Karl Marx. He was the son of Prussian baron Ludwig von Westphalen and his second wife Caroline Heubel. Heubel was also the mother of Jenny Marx who married Karl Marx. Edgar had a half-brother Ferdinand from his father's first marriage. The Westphalen and Marx families were both living in Trier, with Karl and Edgar being friends and schoolmates.

During the Adelsverein-sponsored German immigration to Texas, Edgar von Westphalen was one of the early immigrants to the Latin settlement of Sisterdale.

Westphalen was an early member of the Communist Correspondence Committee's Brussels' circle and later one of the founding members of the Communist League.

== Life ==
=== Family ===
Edgar was the second son of Ludwig von Westphalen (1770–1842), a Royal Prussian Councilor, and his second wife, Caroline Heubel (1779–1856). His father was a friend of Heinrich Marx, which led to a friendship between the children of both families. On December 3, 1834, Ludwig retired to devote himself to the intellectual development of his two children and of Karl Marx, Heinrich Marx's son, thus becoming Karl's fatherly mentor Edgar's sister, Johanna (Jenny) von Westphalen (1814–1881), married her childhood friend Karl Marx in 1843. From his father's first marriage to Lisette von Veltheim came his half-brother Ferdinand von Westphalen, who became Prussian Minister of the Interior in the Manteuffel cabinet in 1850. While the older half-brother Ferdinand followed a conservative line in social policy, the younger Edgar embraced the socialist direction, which was also enthusiastically received by the young Marx at that time.

=== Political activity ===
In 1830, he met Karl Marx at the Trier Gymnasium, who had joined his class as a new student. Both graduated on September 23, 1835. Edgar studied in Berlin and became a junior teacher in Koblenz and, in 1842, in Trier.

In Brussels in 1847, he signed a declaration of the Communist Correspondence Committee. After the failure of the March Revolution of 1848, he and his former schoolmate Mathias Joseph Fischer buried the documents of the Democratic Association (for the preparation of the 1848 elections) and the League of Communists, to which Edgar von Westphalen had already belonged in March 1846, in the Weißhauswald forest, in order to protect Trier citizens from political persecution. Westphalen described the action in a letter dated June 8, 1870:

"I will no longer concern myself with socialist and communist improvements; the last thing I did in this regard was, as treasurer of the Trier Reading and Democratic Agitation Circle, to pack all the files, manifestos, well-intentioned proposals, etc., of the London Junta into a few tin boxes, seal and tap them in the presence of the cigar merchant Fischer, then take a walk to Weißhäuschen and bury them all there on H. von Haw's territory together with Fischer... The success of my well-planned scheme was that in the large-scale communist crackdown and subsequent trial... the Trier group did not appear in court, and secondly, my good mother remained out of the affair."

– The original letter is located in the State Archives of Saxony-Anhalt, Dessau branch. To escape political persecution, he likely fled to Texas in 1848. He left Germany from the port of Bremen on the sailing ship, "Reform." In the USA, Edgar von Westphalen joined the freethinkers and young communists in the Latin Settlement, who had just abandoned their communist settlement, Bettina. In Texas, he served for several years as a liaison to Karl Marx and his political friends in Germany. He traveled back and forth between Texas and Europe several times. His sister Jenny wrote from London to Joseph Weydemeyer (1818–1866) in New York City on October 16, 1851:

"We have no news of Edgar since his departure in April (1851). He left Bremen aboard the sailing ship 'Reform', Captain Ammermann, intending to go ashore at Galveston and remain in New Braunfels." – quoted from Heinz Monz (1998).

In 1865, Westphalen returned to Europe and lived from mid-May to early November of that year in the London home of his sister Jenny and brother-in-law Karl Marx. On November 5, 1865, Edgar left London and spent his final years primarily in Berlin, supported by his half-brother Ferdinand von Westphalen. He also occasionally corresponded with Friedrich Engels and Eleanor Marx.

Edgar von Westphalen died on September 30, 1890, at the age of 71 in Berlin, and was buried in the Luisenstadt Cemetery.

== Works ==
- Aus Havelland. Gedichte. Gensch, Berlin 1883.
- Armin, der Cheruskerfürst. Gensch, Berlin 1883.
- Der Bataveraufstand. Gensch, Berlin 1883.
- Aus Havelland. Gedichte. 2. Auflage. Gensch, Berlin 1884.
- Content in this edit is translated from the existing German Wikipedia article at de:Edgar von Westphalen; see its history for attribution.
