= British-Soviet Friendship Society =

Defunct British society

- Formation: 1946
- Dissolved: 1991
- Legal status: Defunct

The British-Soviet Friendship Society was a British membership organisation for the promotion of political and cultural links between the United Kingdom and the various ethnic groups of the Soviet Union. The society was active from 1946 to 1991, and was a successor to the groups Friends of the Soviet Union, established in 1930, the Russia Today Society (1934), and the Anglo-Soviet Friendship Committee (1940).

== Activities ==
From 1956 to 1990, it published a monthly or bimonthly journal British-Soviet Friendship, retitled BSFS Journal in 1990. In 1952 the society visited the Soviet Union.

== Leadership ==
=== Presidents ===
1946: Henry Wilson
1948: Hewlett Johnson
1966:
1975: Andrew Rothstein

=== Chairmen ===
1946: Stanley Evans
1950: John Platts-Mills
1963: Fred Tonge
1965: Laurence Bradshaw
1978: William Wilson

== Society archives ==
The society's papers are held at the Marx Memorial Library, while the University of Hull's archives hold papers relating to the society's 1952 trip to the Soviet Union.
