= Jenny von Westphalen =

German theatre critic and political activist (1814–1881)

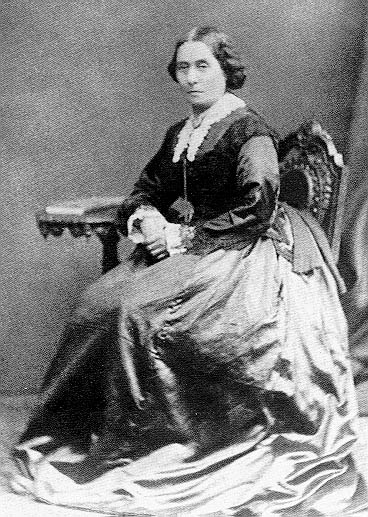
- 1880
- Born: Johanna Bertha Julie Jenny Edle von Westphalen; 12 February 1814; Salzwedel, Kingdom of Prussia
- Died: 2 December 1881 (aged 67); Kentish Town, London, England
- Resting place: Highgate Cemetery
- Spouse: Karl Marx (m. 1843)
- Children: 7, including Jenny, Laura, and Eleanor
- Parent(s): Ludwig von Westphalen; Caroline Heubel
- Relatives: Edgar von Westphalen (brother); Edgar Longuet (grandson); Jean Longuet (grandson)

Johanna Bertha Julie Jenny Edle von Westphalen (German: [fɔn ˈvɛstˌfaːlən]; 12 February 1814 – 2 December 1881) was a German theatre critic and political activist. She married the philosopher and political economist Karl Marx in 1843.

== Background ==
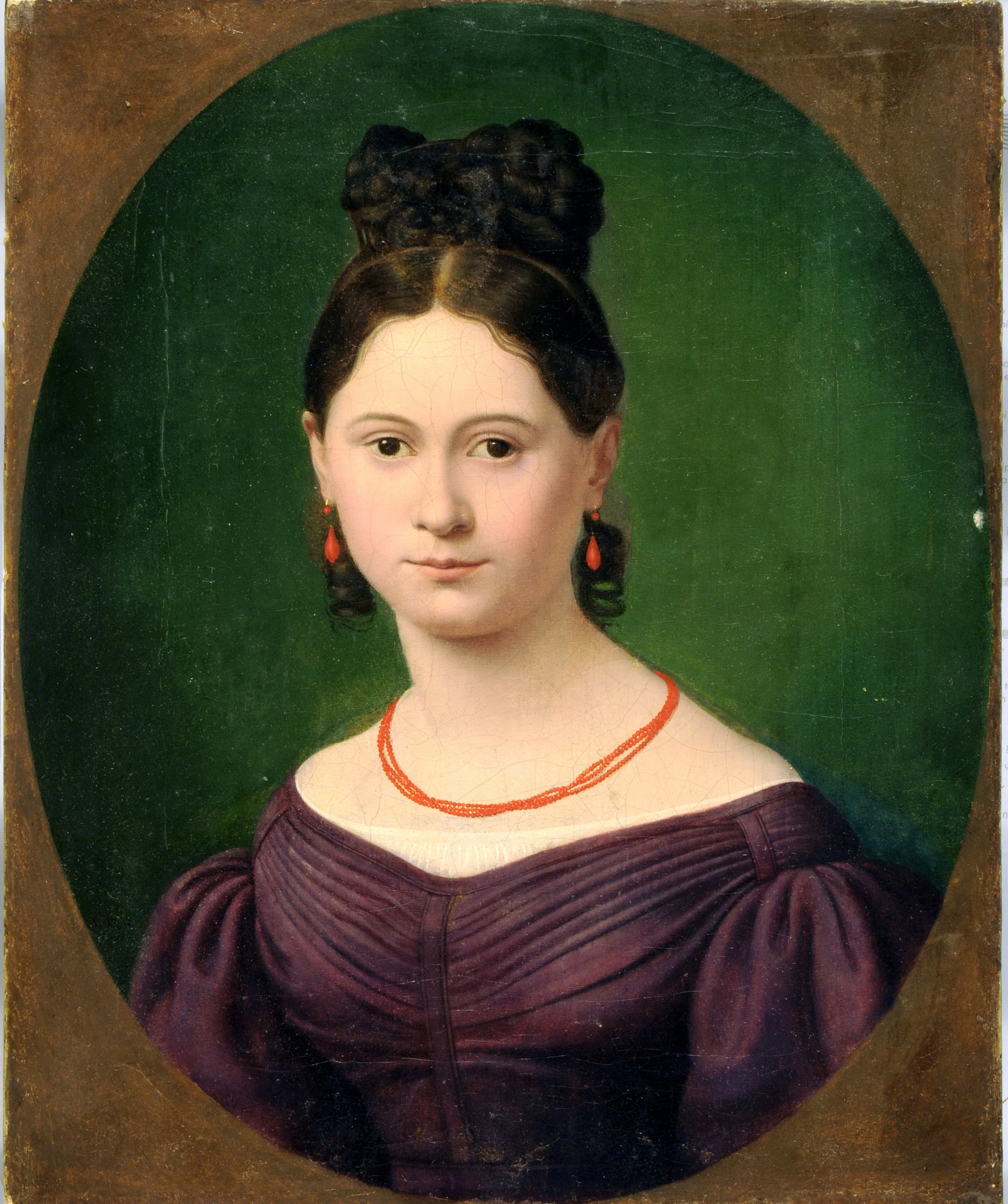
Portrait of a young Jenny von Westphalen, c. 1840s

Jenny von Westphalen was born in the small town of Salzwedel in Northern Germany to a fairly recently ennobled family that had been elevated into the petty nobility. Her father, Ludwig von Westphalen (1770–1842), was a civil servant and former widower with four previous children, who served as Regierungsrat (government councillor) in Salzwedel and in Trier. Her paternal grandfather Philipp Westphal, the son of a Blankenburg postmaster, had been ennobled in 1764 as Edler von Westphalen by Duke Ferdinand of Brunswick for his military services. He had served as the duke's de facto "chief of staff" during the Seven Years' War.

Her paternal grandmother, Jeanie Wishart (1742–1811), was a Scottish noble: her father, the Very Rev Dr George Wishart, (son of William Wishart Principal of Edinburgh University) a descendant of the 9th Earl of Angus, and the 3rd Earl of Marischal, the latter in turn a direct descendant of King James I, of the House of Stuart, while her mother Anne Campbell was the daughter of John Campbell (both a grandson of Sir James Campbell and of Sir Robert Campbell, grandson of Robert Sempill, 3rd Lord Sempill and John Stewart, 4th Earl of Atholl), heir of the Ardkinglas branch of the Clan Campbell, and part of the family of the Dukes of Argyll, who were for centuries Scotland's most powerful family. This would lead to an incident in 1854, when Karl Marx was arrested trying to pawn some of Jenny's Argyll silverware bearing the ducal insignia; the police suspected that a German refugee could not have acquired Argyll's property legally.

Her mother Carolina Heubel (1780–1856) was from a middle-class family, whose father was a retired military horse-care expert. Jenny von Westphalen's brother Edgar von Westphalen (1819–1890), was a schoolmate and friend of Karl Marx. Another brother, Ferdinand Otto Wilhelm Henning von Westphalen, was the conservative Interior Minister of Prussia, 1850–58. Although he was one of the leading conservative forces in 19th century Prussia, Ferdinand would remain on amiable terms with Karl and Jenny Marx.

== Marriage ==
Jenny von Westphalen and Karl Heinrich Marx regularly met each other as children. She was four years older than Karl. They became close friends as teenagers. Both of them were well-read and literary, and they soon began courting. According to Marx, she was the most beautiful girl in the town of Trier. Her father, Ludwig von Westphalen, a friend of Marx's father, also befriended the teenage Marx, and would often go on walks with him, where they would discuss philosophy and English literature. Jenny and Karl became engaged in 1836. They eventually married on 19 June 1843 in the Kreuznacher Pauluskirche (the Kreuznach church of Saint Paul), Bad Kreuznach.

Following their marriage, Karl and Jenny Marx moved to Rue Vaneau in Paris and befriended the German poet Heinrich Heine, who lived at Avenue Matignon.

== Children ==
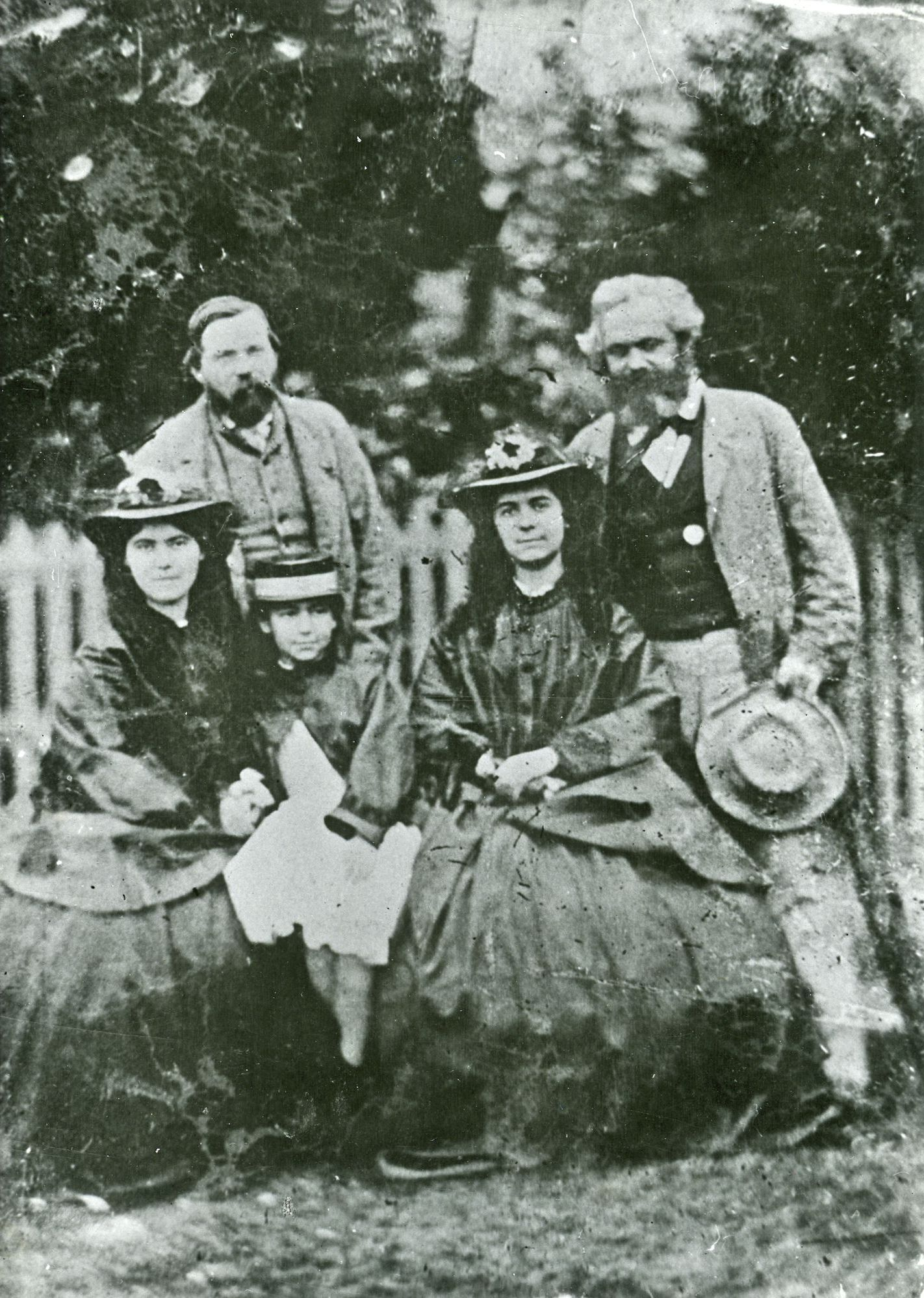
Karl Marx (1818–1883), Friedrich Engels (1820–1895), and Marx's daughters: Jenny Caroline (1844–1883), Jenny Julia Eleanor (1855–1898), and Jenny Laura (1845–1911). Photograph c. 1864.

Karl and Jenny Marx had the following seven children, in chronological order:

1. Jenny Caroline (1 May 1844 – 11 January 1883). Married Charles Longuet in 1872. She was a socialist activist. She wrote for the socialist press in France in the 1860s, most importantly in exposing British treatment of Fenian revolutionaries in Ireland. She died of bladder cancer, aged 38.
2. Jenny Laura (26 September 1845 – 26 November 1911), born in Brussels, Belgium. Married Paul Lafargue in 1868. She was a socialist activist. Laura and her husband did decades of political work together, translating Marx's work into French, and spreading Marxism in France and Spain. She died in a suicide pact with her husband. She was 66.
3. Charles Louis Henri Edgar (3 February 1847 in Brussels – 6 May 1855), Mush to family and friends, named for his uncle Edgar, the brother of Jenny von Westphalen. He died, aged 8.
4. Henry Edward Guy (5 November 1849 – 19 November 1850), Guido to family and friends, born and died in London.
5. Jenny Eveline Frances ("Franziska"; 28 March 1851 – 14 April 1852)
6. Jenny Julia Eleanor (16 January 1855 – 31 March 1898), born in London. She was a socialist activist. She committed suicide at the age of 43 by poisoning herself with prussic acid after discovering that her long-term partner Edward Aveling secretly married a young actress named Eva Frye in June 1897.
7. An unnamed child, born and died 6 July 1857 in London.

== Exile ==
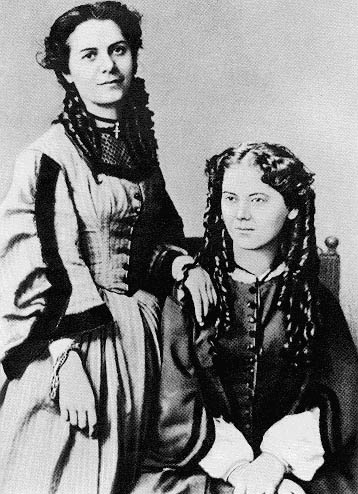
Jenny Caroline and Jenny Laura Marx in 1858.

In 1844, Jenny travelled alone with her baby Jennychen to visit her mother. In 1845, the French political police expelled Karl Marx and the pregnant Jenny, and so the birth of her daughter Laura took place in Brussels.

In 1848, the Brussels police detained Jenny and served an anti-immigrant deportation order. The Marxes returned to Paris and then moved to Cologne.

Revolutionary upsurges took place in many European countries in 1848, including the German states. It was the time of the Communist Manifesto. The Prussian authorities had Karl Marx deported to France, but he soon left with his family for London.

Around 1849–1850, the Marxes lived at Dean Street in London. In 1856 the Marxes moved to Grafton Terrace, near Hampstead Hill in London, thanks to the money given to Jenny by her mother when she died (1856). 9 Grafton Terrace, then at the outskirts of "civilised" London, had a small garden and two floors with seven rooms, including the kitchen. Philosopher Leszek Kołakowski wrote of the Marx family's time in London: "[Karl] Marx was notoriously incapable of keeping accounts, and Jenny was a regular customer of the London pawnbrokers."

== Death ==
In later years Jenny Marx suffered from internal pains, diagnosed as liver cancer. Following a family visit to France, she died in London at the age of 67 on 2 December 1881. She was buried in Highgate Cemetery, London, as was Karl Marx. In 1954, her remains were transferred, along with those of her husband and other family members, to a new grave, over which a memorial was constructed.

== Works ==
- Short Sketch of an Eventful Life (1865–1866)
- Aus der Londoner Theaterwelt. In: Frankfurter Zeitung und Handelsblatt, Frankfurt am Main, No. 328, 21 November 1875
- Londoner Saison. In: Frankfurter Zeitung und Handelsblatt, Frankfurt am Main, No. 95, 4 April 1876
- Englische Shakespeare-Studien. In: Frankfurter Zeitung und Handelsblatt, Frankfurt am Main, No. 3, 3 January 1877
- Shakespeares "Richard III" im Londoner Lyceum-Theater. In: Frankfurter Zeitung und Handelsblatt, Frankfurt am Main, No. 39, 8 February 1877
- Vom Londoner Theater. In: Frankfurter Zeitung und Handelsblatt, Frankfurt am Main, No. 145, 25 May 1877
- Die hervorragendesten Persönlichkeiten der englischen Salonwelt. In: Der Sprudel. Allgemeines deutsches Bade-Journal, Wien, IX. Jg., No. 3, 18 May 1879
- Irving at home. In: Der Sprudel. Allgemeines deutsches Bade-Journal, Wien, IX. Jg., No. 7, 23 June 1879
