= Andrew Rothstein =

British communist journalist and author (1898–1994)

- Born: 26 September 1898; London, England
- Died: 22 September 1994 (aged 95)
- Citizenship: United Kingdom
- Education: Balliol College, Oxford
- Occupations: Soldier, journalist, author
- Known for: 1919 British Army mutiny. Advocacy for the Soviet Union.
- Political party: Communist Party of Great Britain (CPGB)
- Honours: Order of Lenin

Andrew Rothstein (26 September 1898 – 22 September 1994) was a longtime member of the Communist Party of Great Britain (CPGB), and one of the public faces of the British Communist movement. He served in the CPGB's political apparatus, worked as the London correspondent for the TASS news agency, and wrote numerous books and pamphlets in support of the Soviet Union.

== Biography ==
=== Early life ===
Andrew Rothstein was born in London in 1898 to Russian Jewish political emigrants. His life was always tinged by the identity of his father, Soviet diplomat Theodore Rothstein (1871–1953), who had been forced to flee Tsarist Russia for political reasons. Theodore settled in England in 1890 and remained there for the next 30 years, before moving back to the Soviet Union.

Andrew grew up in an ardently communist household, visited by Lenin during his pre-revolution stays in London, such as in 1905. After winning a London County Council scholarship, Andrew studied history at Balliol College, Oxford. In World War I he served in the Oxfordshire and Buckinghamshire Light Infantry and Hampshire Yeomanry. He was a corporal in 1919 when he learned his unit was being sent to Archangel to aid the Allied intervention against the new Soviet government. Rothstein led a mutiny that refused to go to Archangel. It was the first of many British Army rebellions and mutinies—involving up to 30,000 troops at its height—in opposition to the intervention, the history of which Rothstein wrote about in Soldiers' Strikes of 1919.

He returned to Balliol and completed his history degree in 1921. The previous year he had been a founding member of the CPGB, and was actively recruiting others to the Party, including Tom Wintringham. When Rothstein applied for postgraduate research at Oxford, he was denied an Army grant and thus could not afford to continue his studies:

A stern letter from the Master and Fellows at Balliol announced that he must leave immediately. Twenty years later...a former junior dean from those days...told him that the Foreign Secretary Lord Curzon had personally intervened in his case. Rothstein recalled: "He told me a letter was read out from Curzon, which said that I was a very dangerous Communist and must not be allowed to stay."

Lord Curzon, who was Chancellor of Oxford University at the time, was reportedly angry that Rothstein had taken other undergraduates on a trip to Soviet Russia.

=== Career ===
In 1921, Rothstein became the London correspondent of ROSTA (later TASS), the state-owned Soviet news agency. He remained in that post until 1945. He sometimes used the political pseudonym "C. M. Roebuck", both as an author, and in his role on the CPGB's National Executive Committee. From 1929 to 1931, Rothstein was deputy head of the Anglo-American Bureau of the Moscow-based Red International of Labour Unions. In the late 1920s he was on the first Executive Committee of the Society for Cultural Relations Between the Peoples of the British Commonwealth and the USSR.

Rothstein wrote frequently on the economy, history, institutions, and foreign relations of the Soviet Union. His works included The Soviet Constitution (1923), Soviet Peace Policy: A Barrier to War (1935), Workers in the Soviet Union (1942), and Man and Plan in the Soviet Economy (1948). From 1943 to 1950, he was president of the Foreign Press Association. After World War II, he was London correspondent of the Czechoslovak trade union paper, Práce, a position he held until 1970.

Starting in 1946, he lectured at London University's School of Slavonic and East European Studies. Four years later he was dismissed on the grounds of "inadequate scholarship"; however, he claimed, and The Guardian also suggested, that there was "an unpleasant whiff of McCarthyism" about his dismissal. In 1950 he published A History of the U.S.S.R., the first of two works for Penguin Books, the other being Peaceful Coexistence (1955).

With his fluency in Russian, Rothstein translated numerous Russian-language texts into English, such as The Last Days of Tsar Nicholas (1935), Hitlerite Responsibility under Criminal Law (1945), Georgi Plekhanov's In Defence of Materialism (1947), Boris Ponomarev's History of the Communist Party of the Soviet Union (1962), and Nadezhda Krupskaya's Memories of Lenin (1970).

=== Later years ===
In 1970, Rothstein was awarded a Soviet pension. He also became chair of London's Marx Memorial Library, and was vice-chair of the British-Soviet Friendship Society. In his later years, he continued to research and write, for example, he published A House on Clerkenwell Green (1966) about the building that houses the Marx Memorial Library. Drawing on personal experience, he wrote two books about resistance to the Allied intervention in the Russian Civil War: When Britain Invaded Soviet Russia: the Consul Who Rebelled (1979) and The Soldiers' Strikes of 1919 (1980).

An orthodox Marxist all his life, Rothstein was a critic of the 1980s trends in the CPGB toward revisionist Marxism and Eurocommunism. In October 1985, he and Robin Page Arnot co-wrote an article entitled "The British Communist Party and Euro-Communism" for the CPUSA's Political Affairs magazine, in which they argued that "Euro-Communism today is the revisionism of yesterday".

In 1988, Rothstein was a proud recipient of card number one of the re-established Communist Party of Britain (CPB). His last published article was "British Communists and the Comintern 1919-1929", printed in summer 1991 in the CPB publication, Communist Review.

Andrew Rothstein died in London on 22 September 1994, at age 95. Some obituaries sharply criticized him for his decades-long loyalty to the Soviet Union.

=== Personal life ===
Rothstein married Edith Lunn in Hampstead, London, in 1922. They had a son Andrew, and a daughter Natalie who became a curator and academic.

== Selected works ==
- The Soviet Constitution. Labour Publishing Company, 1923 (as editor). OCLC 2988516.
- Russia's Socialist Triumph: Exposition of the Soviet Union's Five Years' Plan of Socialist Construction. Communist Party of Great Britain, 1929. OCLC 12202088.
- Bykov, P. M. The Last Days of Tsar Nicholas. "Translated by Andrew Rothstein". International Publishers, 1935. OCLC 4273520.
- Soviet Peace Policy: A Barrier to War. Modern Books, 1935. OCLC 37754322.
- Workers in the Soviet Union. F. Muller, 1942. OCLC 13345118.
- Plekhanov, G. V. In Defence of Materialism: The Development of the Monist View of History. "Translated by Andrew Rothstein". Lawrence & Wishart, 1947. LCCN 49-762.
- Man and Plan in Soviet Economy. F. Muller, 1948. OCLC 3497332.
- A History of the U.S.S.R. Penguin Books, 1950. OCLC 803656559.
- A People Reborn: The Story of North Ossetia. Lawrence & Wishart, 1954 (as editor). OCLC 26831075.
- Peaceful Coexistence. Penguin Books, 1955. LCCN 55-3505.
- The Soviet Union and Socialism. London Communist Party, 1957. OCLC 7045092.
- The Munich Conspiracy. Lawrence & Wishart, 1958. OCLC 236248
- A House on Clerkenwell Green. Lawrence & Wishart, 1966. OCLC 12413007.
- When Britain Invaded Soviet Russia: The Consul Who Rebelled. Journeyman Press, 1979. OCLC 6902165.
- The Soldiers' Strikes of 1919. Palgrave Macmillan, 1980. OCLC 60071857.
- "The British Communist Party and Euro-Communism", Political Affairs, October 1985. Co-written with Robin Page Arnot.
