= Jean Longuet =

French politician (1876–1938)

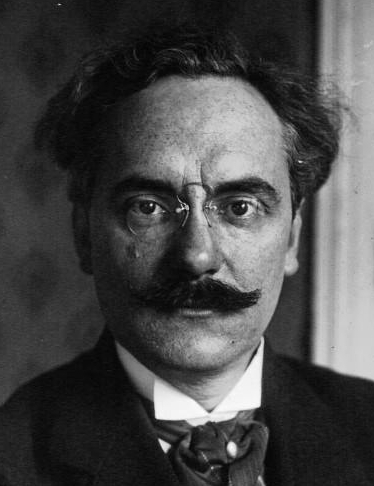
- Longuet in 1918
- Born: Jean-Laurent-Frederick Longuet; 5 October 1876; London, England
- Died: 11 September 1938 (aged 61); Aix-les-Bains, France
- Occupation(s): Journalist, lawyer and socialist politician
- Spouse: Anita Desvaux
- Children: Robert-Jean Longuet, journalist; Karl-Jean Longuet, sculptor
- Parents: Charles Longuet (father); Jenny Longuet (mother)
- Relatives: Karl Marx (maternal grandfather); Jenny von Westphalen (maternal grandmother); Laura Marx (aunt); Eleanor Marx (aunt); Edgar Longuet (brother)

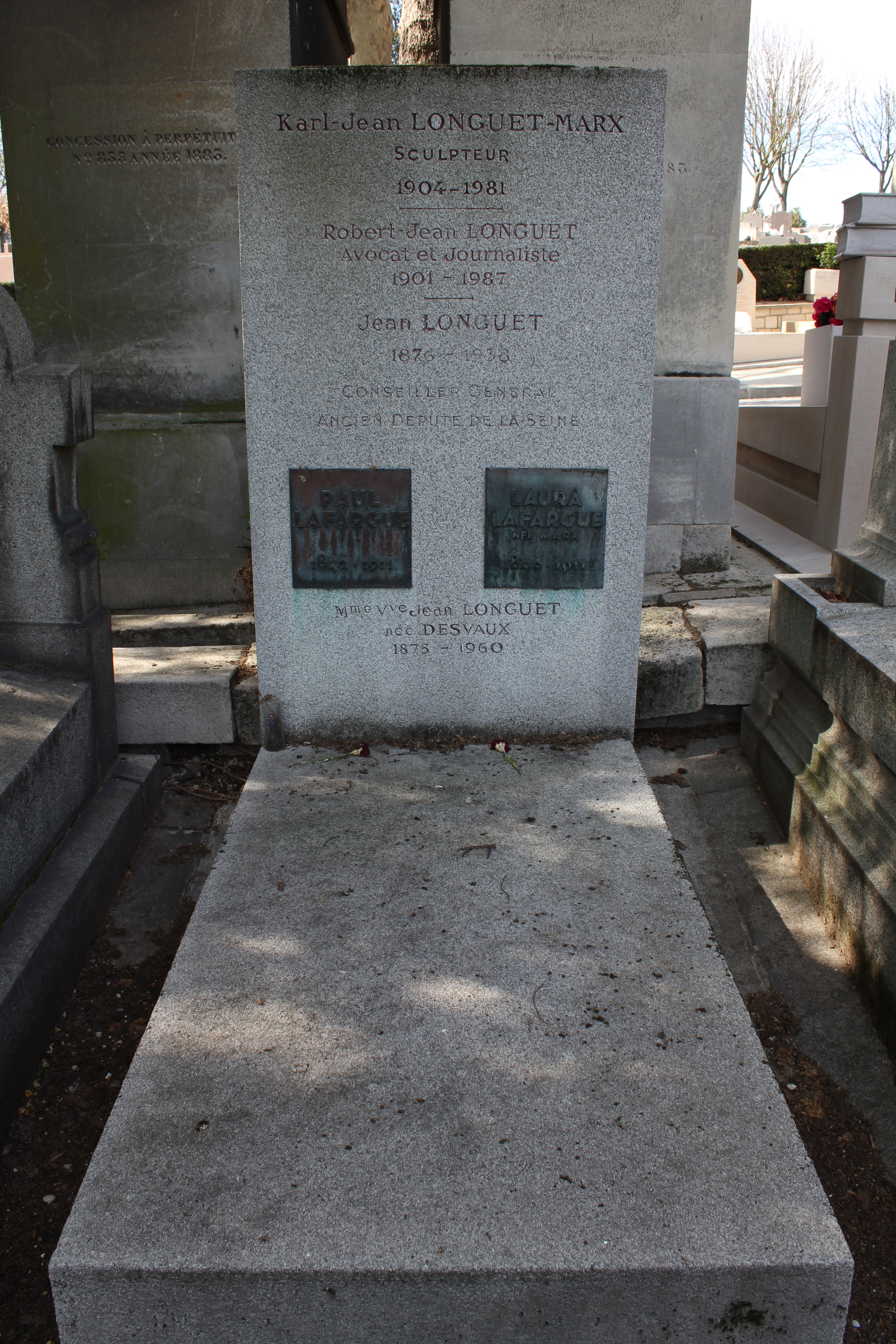
The Lafargue's Grave in Père Lachaise Cemetery, Paris. Longuet and his wife and sons are also buried here

Jean-Laurent-Frederick Longuet (French pronunciation: [ʒɑ̃ lɔ̃ɡɛ]; 5 October 1876 – 11 September 1938) was a French socialist politician and journalist. He was the grandson of German-born philosopher Karl Marx.

== Early years ==
Jean, often called 'Johnny' as a boy by his family, was born in London on October 5, 1876, the son of Charles and Jenny Longuet. He was their second son, and the eldest who survived to adulthood. The family often visited Jenny's father, Karl Marx, who liked to play with his grandchildren.

The Longuet family moved to France in February 1881. In summer 1882 Karl Marx stayed with the Longuets for three months, being joined by Jean's aunt Eleanor Marx. By this time Jenny was suffering from bladder cancer, and would die a year later. To ease the burden on the family, Eleanor took Jean back to England in August 1882, promising to educate and discipline him. They became close, with Eleanor thinking of him as ‘my boy’. On his return to France, Jean lived for a time with his father's family in Caen to continue his studies.

== Political career ==
After attending university in Paris, Longuet worked as a journalist and trained as a lawyer. He worked for the newspaper L'Humanité and was a founder and editor of the newspaper Le Populaire. He was active in one of France's principal socialist parties, the French Section of the Workers' International (SFIO), and served both as a mayor and as a member of the French Chamber of Deputies.

During the First World War, he was a pacifist but also supported war credits. At the Strasbourg Congress in 1918 his policy was adopted by the majority of the socialist SFIO. After the Tours Congress of 1920 had the Communists gain the majority, he supported the minority and joined the centrist Two-and-a-half International, the Vienna Union. He criticised the League Against Imperialism, which was created in 1927 and supported by the Comintern.

Longuet supported Zionist positions at the Socialist International meeting in Brussels in 1930 and at a speech to a Zionist group in Paris in 1935.

He also represented Vinayak Damodar Savarkar, a political prisoner, who while being taken from Bombay to England to stand trial on the charges of sedition and abetment of murder, escaped from the ship, which was docked at Marseilles, and swam ashore until he was caught by a French gendarme. The case drew criticism from the French socialist press, which decried that the individual rights of Savarkar had been trampled as a result of his arrest by British constables on French soil, which they believed to violate the sovereignty of France.

Pressure from the leftist and liberal press continued and forced both countries in October 1910 to take their case to the Permanent Court of Arbitration in The Hague.

Madam Cama, a revolutionary Parsi woman from Bombay who was one of the founders of the Paris Indian Society, managed to get power of attorney, which facilitated the engagement of Longuet as Savarkar's representative in The Hague. However, as the arbitration was between France and Britain, the tribunal did not accept Longuet's memorandum on behalf of Savarkar, considering it out of the terms of reference. However, Longuet persisted and personally handed over the copies of the memorandum to the members of the court.

== Death and family ==
Jean Longuet married Anita Desvaux (1875–1960) in 1900. They had two sons: the lawyer and journalist Robert-Jean Longuet (1901–1987) and the sculptor Karl-Jean Longuet (1904–1981). Jean's younger brother Edgar Longuet, a physician, was also an active socialist.

Longuet died at the Aix-les-Bains Clinic after a car accident in September 1938, aged 61. He was buried at the Père Lachaise Cemetery in Paris, in the same grave as his aunt and uncle, Laura and Paul Lafargue. Longuet's wife and two sons were later buried in the same grave.
