= MECW =

MECW may refer to:

- Marx/Engels Collected Works, the largest collection of translations into English of the works of Karl Marx and Friedrich Engels
- Main Event Championship Wrestling, an American professional wrestling promotion
