= Robert-Jean Longuet =

French lawyer (1901-1987)

Robert-Jean Gustave Longuet
- Born: 9 December 1901; 10th arrondissement of Paris, France
- Died: 19 March 1987 (aged 85); Paris, France
- Burial place: Père Lachaise Cemetery
- Occupations: Journalist, politician, lawyer
- Political party: French Section of the Workers' International
- Father: Jean Longuet
- Family: Karl-Jean Longuet (brother)

Robert-Jean Gustave Longuet (French: [ʁɔbɛʁ ʒɑ̃ lɔ̃ɡɛ]; 9 December 1901 – 19 March 1987) was a French lawyer, journalist and militant socialist. He was the son of Jean Longuet, and the great-grandson of Karl Marx.

He notably rejected many overtures by Communists to whom it is said he often replied "No. You have falsified my great-grandfather." He was a supporter of Charles De Gaulle during the Second World War.

== Biography ==
From 1924–1926, Longuet was the editor of Le Quotidien and later became the editorial secretary of the Nouvelle revue socialiste in 1926.

After a trip to Morocco in 1926 and in 1927, his work as a lawyer led him to defend anti-imperialist activists. Longuet founded the magazine Maghreb in 1932, which existed until 1935.

Longuet traveled to North Africa several times with Léo Wanner to meet with leaders of independence movements. In August 1936, he and Wanner met with Mohamed Hassan Ouazzani in Fez, in what was then the Spanish protectorate in Morocco.

Before the start of the Second World War, he emigrated to the United States and lived there for five years. After the conclusion of the war, Longuet worked primarily as a journalist. He was the Washington correspondent of the communist daily Tonight, and additionally the editor of the newspaper Libération Emmanuel d'Astier La Vigerie.

During the Algerian War, he defended National Liberation Front activists as well as the activists at the Grand Mosque of Paris.

In August 1979, he cooperated with Czechoslovak communist secret police on demonstration supporting the invasion of Warsaw pact armies to Czechoslovakia in August 1968.

Longuet died in Paris on 19 March 1987.

== Bibliography ==
- La Profession d’avocat, 1932
- Colonialisme et civilisation, 1934
- La Question coloniale, 1936
- Karl Marx, mon grand-père, Stock, 1977
- Au cœur de l’Europe, le "printemps" ou "l’automne" de Prague, Coopérative ouvrière de presse et d’éditions, Luxembourg, 1978, Préface by Jeannette Vermeersch

== Sources ==
- Dictionnaire biographique du mouvement ouvrier français, tome 35 (fr)
- Georges Oved, La Gauche française et le nationalisme marocain, 1905-1955, L’Harmattan, 1984 (fr)
