= Karl-Jean Longuet =

French sculptor, Karl Marx's great-grandson

Karl-Jean Longuet (10 November 1904 – 20 July 1981) was a French sculptor. He was the son of Jean Longuet, the grandson of Charles Longuet and the great-grandson of Karl Marx.

Longuet was married to the sculptor Simone Boisecq.
