= Edgar Longuet =

French doctor (1879–1950)

- Born: Edgar Marcel Longuet; 18 August 1879; Ramsgate, Kent, England
- Died: 12 December 1950 (aged 71)
- Resting place: Alfortville, France
- Occupation(s): French doctor and socialist

Edgar Marcel Longuet (18 August 1879 – 12 December 1950), was a French physician and socialist activist, and a grandson of Karl Marx.

== Life ==
Longuet was born in Ramsgate, UK, a son of Charles Longuet and Jenny Caroline Marx, the daughter of Karl Marx. His nickname, "Wolf" was given to him as a small child and referred to his craving for food. The family moved to France when Edgar was 18 months old, this becoming his home.

He was active in the French labor movement and in 1905 joined the Socialist Party, being a supporter of Jules Guesde. He left the Socialists in 1937, and in 1938 became a member of French Communist Party, in which he was an active figure. Politically, he was a stalwart Stalinist and admired the Soviet Union. In 1948, Longuet donated a daguerreotype to the Institute for Marxism-Leninism at the Central Committee of the CPSU in Moscow that depicted his grandfather Karl Marx with daughters Jenny (Longuet's mother), Eleanor and Laura and family friend Friedrich Engels. In the same year he took part in the celebration of the 100th anniversary of the Communist Manifesto in the Soviet Union and in People's Republic of Poland which his grandfather Karl Marx and Friedrich Engels had written.

Longuet lived in Alfortville, a suburb of Paris. He worked as a doctor, practicing until shortly before his death in 1950.

Edgar Longuet was the father of the painter Frédéric Longuet and the politician Paul Longuet. His brother Jean was also an active socialist, and a member of the French Chamber of Deputies.

== Works ==
- Some pages of the family life of Karl Marx. In: Mohr and General. Memories of Marx and Engels. Dietz Verlag, Berlin 1964, pp. 359–374
