= Charles Longuet =

French journalist and politician (1839–1903)

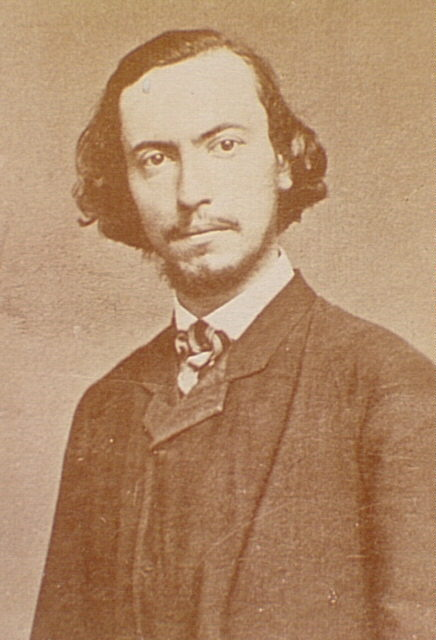
- Born: Charles Félix César Longuet; 14 February 1839; Caen, France
- Died: 5 August 1903 (aged 64); Paris, France
- Occupation: Journalist
- Spouse: Jenny Marx
- Children: 6 (including Jean Longuet and Edgar Longuet)
- Relatives: Karl Marx (father-in-law); Jenny von Westphalen (mother-in-law); Laura Marx (sister-in-law); Eleanor Marx (sister-in-law)

Charles Félix César Longuet (French pronunciation: [ʃaʁl feliks sezaʁ lɔ̃ɡɛ]; 14 February 1839, Caen – 5 August 1903, Paris) was a journalist and prominent figure in the French working-class movement, including the 1871 Paris Commune, as well as a Proudhonist member of the General Council of the First International or International Working Men's Association (1866–67, 1871–72). He served as Corresponding Secretary for Belgium (1866), delegate to the Lausanne (1867), Brussels (1868), the London Conference (1871) and the (1872). He was also the editor of the publication Journal Officiel.

Longuet participated in the Paris Commune of 1871 and, after its defeat, moved to England as a refugee where he met Karl Marx. Longuet married Marx's eldest daughter, Jenny, on 2 October 1872 in London (in a civil ceremony). Together, they had six children, the first five of whom were boys, the last a daughter. Two of the sons died in infancy. Of the others, Jean, a journalist and Edgar, a physician, both became prominent socialist activists in France.

Longuet returned to France, after a political amnesty granted by the French government in July 1880. Here he took a position as an editor of La Justice, a radical daily newspaper founded by Georges Clemenceau. His wife and children joined him in February 1881, the family settling in the town of Argenteuil, near Paris. Here Jenny died in January 1883, probably from cancer of the bladder. Two months later her father, Karl Marx, died; Longuet was one of the speakers at his funeral.

Charles Longuet died in Paris on 5 August 1903 at the age of 64. He was buried at the Père Lachaise Cemetery.
