= Value, Price and Profit =

Literary work by Karl Marx

- Cover of an early 20th-century edition by Charles H. Kerr & Co.
- Speaker: Karl Marx
- Date: June 20 and June 27, 1865
- Location: London, United Kingdom
- Venue: General Council of the International Workingmen's Association
- Language: English
- Transcript: Found in Marx's papers; published posthumously by Eleanor Marx (1898)
- Purpose: To refute John Weston's economic determinism and explain surplus value to the working class
- Key topics: Labor theory of value, Surplus value, Class struggle, Trade unionism

American paperback edition of Value, Price and Profit published by Charles H. Kerr & Co. in 1908.

Value, Price and Profit — also widely published in English under the title Wages, Price and Profit — is a short book by Karl Marx first delivered in English as two lectures to the First International Workingmen's Association (IWA) on June 20 and 27, 1865. This material was written between the end of May and June 27 in 1865, while the first volume of Capital was in preparation.

With this paper Marx sought to refute the views of IWA Central Council member John Weston, who in a paper read earlier that year asserted the prosperity of the working class could not be improved by wage gains and that therefore the focused efforts of trade unions to win pay hikes was detrimental to the long-term interests of the workers' movement.

Marx argued instead that the wage gains and shortening of work hours fought for by unions, while providing only temporary amelioration from the ongoing immiseration of workers by capitalism, nevertheless provided a valuable organizing function. He also provided a brief and simplified explanation of the labour theory of value and the relationship between value and commodity prices and the rate of profit.

== Bibliographic history ==
Marx was initially undecided about whether to publish the Value, Price and Profit lectures in book form. He wrote to Frederick Engels on June 24, 1865, that whereas the first half of his paper, "a reply to Weston's nonsense," provided no difficulty, the second section, containing "in an extraordinarily condensed but relatively popular form" many ideas which would appear for the first time in the first volume of Das Kapital, then being readied for initial publication. He asked his friend Engels "whether it is advisable to anticipate things of that kind in such a way," leaving the decision to him since "you can look at the matter with more detachment from a distance."

Although Engels' reply has not survived, it must certainly have been in the negative as the lectures to the General Council were never published in Marx's lifetime.

The original manuscript surviving in Marx's papers bore no title and was simply headed "Read to the Central Council on Tuesday, 20th June 1865." The work was titled posthumously. The manuscript was divided by Marx into 14 sections, each marked with an Arabic numeral, with no heading provided for the first six sections.

The work was first published in German as Lohn, Preis und Profit, initially appearing in the theoretical journal Die Neue Zeit in 1898. Although not written by either Marx or Engels, this German title, best translated as "Wages, Price and Profit," was the source of the dual naming of this work.

The material was first published in its original English under its more familiar title, Value, Price and Profit, later in 1898 as a book edited by Marx's daughter Eleanor Marx Aveling, featuring a short introduction by her husband, Edward Aveling. The Avelings provided headings for the first six sections of the book, originally untitled.

An English reprint edition by London publisher Allen & Unwin appeared in 1899, the first of several reprints in England and Scotland.

The book was first published in the United States by the Socialist Labor Party in 1901 with an introduction and notations by Lucien Sanial. This was followed in 1908 by editions in both paper and hardcover published by Charles H. Kerr & Co. of Chicago, a publisher closely aligned to the Socialist Party of America.

The book's first publication in English under separate covers by the American communist movement came in 1933, with initial publication in Moscow by the state publishing house, bearing the imprimateur of the Cooperative Publishing Society of Foreign Workers in the USSR. This was followed by an edition published by International Publishers in New York in 1935.

An edition bearing the title Wages, Price, and Profit, produced in Beijing for export to the English-speaking world, appeared in 1973.

The definitive scholarly edition appeared in 1985 as part of volume 20 of the Marx–Engels Collected Works. Although typographically identical, this volume was produced in Moscow similtaneously for the Soviet state publishing house Progress Publishers, Lawrence & Wishart in the UK, and International Publishers in the USA.

== Theses ==
Three short theses for the Value, Price and Profit lectures have survived in the papers of Karl Marx, which were first published in a volume in the Soviet Union in 1961.

In the first of these, Marx indicated that "a general rise in the rate of wages will, broadly speaking, produce a general fall in the rate of profits, leaving the values of commodities unaltered." This implies that Marx believed wage hikes could, at least temporarily, outpace price hikes, providing benefit to wage labourers.

Secondly, Marx stated that "the general tendency of production...is not to raise, but to lower wages" and that therefore a rise in the general wage level would thus necessarily be temporary and ameliorative rather than an ultimate solution to the "slavery of the wages' labourer."

Finally, Marx postulated that trade union activity to raise wages and shorten the length of the working day was useful not only in providing temporary respite from the worst effects of capitalism but also was beneficial as "a means of organising the working class as a class." Therefore, contrary to the ideas advocated by John Weston, against whom Marx was arguing, trade union activity would have lasting benefits even if increases in real wages were brief and ephemeral.

== Synopsis ==
In Value, Price and Profit Marx argues that because there are economic laws governing the value of commodities as represented by the social relationship of wages and price, capitalists cannot raise or lower wages merely at their whim, nor can they raise prices at will in order to make up for lost profits resulting from an increase in wages. At the heart of the argument is the labour theory of value and the related premise that profit represents surplus value created by labour working above and beyond the amount needed to reproduce itself, as represented by wages and the buying power of wages viz. the price of commodities (particularly necessities). In other words, profit is what is left over after paying the worker a wage representing a certain portion of the labour performed, the remainder effectively being unpaid and reserved to the capitalist.

Because this arrangement depends ultimately on the social conditions of labour and production, despite the existence of apparently natural laws governing the value of commodities, within these limits workers can organize around demanding a higher rate of pay at the expense of the profits of the capitalist, not at their own expense as argued by Weston, who claims that capitalists will simply raise prices in order to sell the same quantity of produce at a rate that will pay for the same quantity of labour, effectively cancelling out any wage gains won by workers through union activities.

Marx argues that profit is derived not by selling commodities above their value, in which case capitalists could raise prices at whim, but that commodities sold at or near their natural value produce profit because workers are only paid for that portion of their work which pays for their own labour power, i.e. that labour which generates enough value to pay workers their wages. In this regard Marx distinguishes value as the natural price of a commodity through the labour power invested in it, which forms an upper limit to wages, and the rate of profit as the ratio between the surplus value left to the capitalist after paying the wage, and the wage itself, thus excluding investments in capital prior to production, and disregarding payments by capitalists in rent to landlords and interest to moneylenders which must come from surplus value after production.

This ratio, the difference between the value created by the "last employed worker" and the wage paid to that worker, which constitutes Marx's use of the word "exploitation."

Marx concludes that as value is determined by labour, and as profit is the appropriated surplus value remaining after paying wages, that the maximum profit is set by the minimum wage necessary to sustain labour, but is in turn adjusted by the overall productive powers of labour using given tools and machines, the length of the workday, the intensity of work demanded, and the fluctuating prices of commodities such as metals and foodstuffs which determine how much a worker may purchase with wages expressed in money. All of these factors being a product of a given social arrangement, in this case the system of wage labour itself, the worker is left at the mercy of commodities and the cycles of capitalism, but not at the whim of the capitalists who pay their wages, who will lower wages during a decrease in the value of labour, but will resist efforts to increase wages during the cyclical upswings and despite any other factors which might increase the value of labour back to its average, natural level.

Thus insisting that workers can not only exert pressure to increase their wages as a reflection of the value of their labour as a commodity, but must in fact organize to do so lest the inherent pressures of capitalism reduce them to "one level mass of broken wretches past salvation," Marx nonetheless declares unionism to be a conservative force so long as it restricts itself to a defensive preservation of what can only amount to historically average wages, without attempting to abolish the system of wage labour itself.
