= Karl Marx Library =

Series of translations and commentaries of Karl Marx

The Karl Marx Library
- Common dust jacket of Padover's "Karl Marx Library"
- Author: Saul K. Padover (ed.)
- Cover artist: Roger Ferriter
- Language: English
- Genre: history
- Published: 1971–1977 (in 7 volumes)
- Publication place: United States

The Karl Marx Library is a topically-organized series of original translations and biographical commentaries edited by historian and Karl Marx scholar Saul K. Padover (1905–1981) and published by academic publisher McGraw-Hill Books. Originally projected as a 13-volume series at the time of its launch in 1971, ultimately only 7 volumes found print prior to Padover's death, supplemented by a biography and an unnumbered volume of selected correspondence.

The scholarly utility of the series was severely undermined by the 1975 launch of the 50-volume Marx-Engels Collected Works project jointly published by Progress Publishers of Moscow, International Publishers of New York City, and Lawrence and Wishart of London. The abruptly-terminated series proved to be a short-lived focal point for Marx scholarship during the first half of the decade of the 1970s.

The formal Karl Marx Library series was terminated in 1977, with two tangential volumes by Padover subsequently published during the last years of his life, including a full-length biography of Marx.

== Publication history ==
=== Launch ===
An ambitious scholarly project entitled "The Karl Marx Library" was launched in 1971 by historian and Karl Marx scholar Saul K. Padover. A total of 13 volumes were projected for the series, each to contain new translations of full or extracted writings by Marx dealing with a specific topical themes. The academic utility of the series was questioned even at the time of its initial launch, with journal reviewer Z.A. Jordan of Carleton University making note of a recent announcement that Communist Party publishers Lawrence and Wishart (UK) and International Publishers (US) were to begin complete translation and publication of the massive Marx-Engels-Gesamtausgabe (MEGA) produced by Karl Dietz Verlag Berlin starting in 1958.

"This development is bound to reduce the usefulness of Dr. Padover's series on which he must have expended much energy and time-consuming effort", Jordan presciently predicted.

=== On Revolution (1971) ===
The first volume of the series, On Revolution (1971), broke little original ground for Marx scholars, containing only a spate of articles from the 1850s from Horace Greeley's New York Tribune on the contemporary situation in Spain that were not already readily available in other publications. Padover's failure to maintain a chronological presentation of documents was criticized by one reviewer, who observed that Marx's own views on the nature and time span of the revolutionary process evolved considerably during the second half of the 1800s. Padover's lengthy introduction to the first volume, "Karl Marx as Revolutionist", was likewise criticized as biographical rather than introductory to the material presented and the book's bibliography was panned as "highly selective, if not parochial" for its lack of works published outside the United States.

Another academic reviewer was no less harsh, declaring that "unfortunately, the best that can be said about the volume's scholarly apparatus is that it is all but swallowed up in the 600-odd pages of authentic, or nearly authentic, Marx texts." Padover was lauded for judicious selection of documents and "capable" translation, with the inclusion of selected correspondence singled out as particularly illuminating. His own editorial contribution was deemed to be problematic, however, with Padover's bibliographic notes said to "contain more errors of commission and omission" than could be conveniently cited in short academic review. Padover's failure to print Marx's writings in concert with those of his friend and co-thinker Frederick Engels was also cause for criticism.

Beyond Padover's introductory and supplemental material the contents of the first volume were divided into five parts, dealing in turn with general principles of revolutionary theory, The Communist Manifesto, and journalism related to specific revolutionary events in France, Germany, and Spain.

=== On Freedom of the Press and Censorship (1974) ===
On Freedom of the Press and Censorship, the fourth of the scheduled 13 volumes of the Karl Marx Library, saw print in 1974. The book's importance was already diminished by the forthcoming appearance of initial volumes of the Marx-Engels Collected Works through a well-funded international effort spearheaded by three Communist Party-related publishing houses.

Padover was again taken to task by Z. A. Jordan in the pages of the American Political Science Review, with Jordan particularly questioning the decision to treat Marx in binary terms as a "Revolutionist" and an "Embattled Journalist" — with the former writing dealing with the Revolutions of 1848 split out into the volume On Revolution and other writing presented as the work of a "fighting journalist" engaged in a dedicated effort to win freedom of the press and abolition of censorship in Germany. Jordan considered such a division to be a "doubtful" assumption, noting that Marx's primary fight as a journalist by the time of his Neue Rheinische Zeitung editorship had been not for freedom of the press per se, but rather "to stem the rising tide of the counter-revolution, led by the King of Prussia and his ministers, who used censorship effectively, to restrict the activities of their political opponents and, finally, to silence the opposition altogether."

As a result, Jordan argued, the On Freedom of the Press and Censorship collection unsatisfactory, particularly for its "disappointingly inadequate" selection of material from the Neue Rheinische Zeitung and failure to document the evolution of Marx's political thinking on censorship matters over time.

Structurally speaking, On Freedom of the Press and Censorship was divided into four sections. The first dealt with the young Marx's writing for the Rheinische Zeitung, a second on writing for its successor publication the Neue Rheinische Zeitung, a third with personal letters by Marx, with a final section containing official documents and correspondence dealing with Marx's alleged transgressions with the censorship as editor of the two Rhenish newspapers with which he was associated.

=== On Religion (1974) ===
Padover's fifth topical volume of the Karl Marx Library, On Religion, drew significant academic attention beyond the more typical scholarly province of intellectual history and the history of the labor movement. Writing in the Catholic Historical Review, Joseph O'Malley of Marquette University observed that "Marx's idea of religion, as shown in these excerpts, remained one and fixed throughout his adult life," and that religion to Marx "at best provides some individuals the diversion of an illusory solace and at worst acts in and on society as an anti-human force." O'Malley further observed that "it appears that Marx never entertained the slightest doubt about the atheism he had adopted by the age of nineteen."

Despite his intimations of the collection's merits, Padover was again taken to task by O'Malley for certain editorial errors, including attribution of the article "Luther as Arbiter Between Strauss and Feuerbach" to Marx rather than to Ludwig Feuerbach, as new scholarship had revealed.

Writing in the Journal of Church and State, Elmer H. Duncan welcomed Padover's effort as a "useful" collection of Marx's writing on religious topics, "gleaned from many, perhaps most, of his published works". Calling the book "invaluable" to readers interested in Marx's personal views on religion, Duncan found fault with the shortness of the book's constituent sections and the aspect of compilation of writings produced over a number of years into a single topical heading. Noting the rabbinically-descended Marx's "intense hatred of Jews and of the Jewish faith", Duncan coyly noted that some purple passages with anti-Semitic overtones "should guarantee that this book will be of interest to theologians, philosophers, political scientists, economists, and psychologists".

The structure of the fifth volume included a 19-page introductory essay by Padover followed by division of the textual material into three parts, dealing with "Christianity and Religion in General", "Judaism and the Jews", and "Personal Letters". Material within each of these sections followed a chronological approach, marked by ample editorial annotation.

== Series ==
=== Volumes published ===
- Vol. 1: On Revolution. New York: McGraw-Hill Book Co., 1971.
- Vol. II: On America and the Civil War. New York: McGraw-Hill Book Co., 1972.
- Vol. III: On the First International. New York: McGraw-Hill Book Co., 1973.
- Vol. IV: On Freedom of the Press and Censorship. New York: McGraw-Hill Book Co., 1974.
- Vol. V: On Religion. New York: McGraw-Hill Book Co., 1974.
- Vol. VI: On Education, Women and Children. New York: McGraw-Hill Book Co., 1975.
- Vol. VII: On History and People. New York: McGraw-Hill Book Co., 1977.

=== Related volumes ===
- Karl Marx: An Intimate Biography. New York: McGraw-Hill Book Co., 1978.
- The Letters of Karl Marx. Englewood Cliffs, NJ: Prrentice-Hall, 1979.

=== Unpublished projected volumes ===
- Vol. VIII: On Radical Leaders and Theorists.
- Vol. IX: On Britain, Ireland, and Colonialism.
- Vol. X: On International Affairs.
- Vol. XI: Capital (Excerpts, Prefaces, and Letters).
- Vol. XII: Economic Writings.
- Vol. XIII: Personal and Family Letters.

== See also ==
- Marx/Engels Collected Works
