= Ammar Aziz =

Pakistani documentary filmmaker

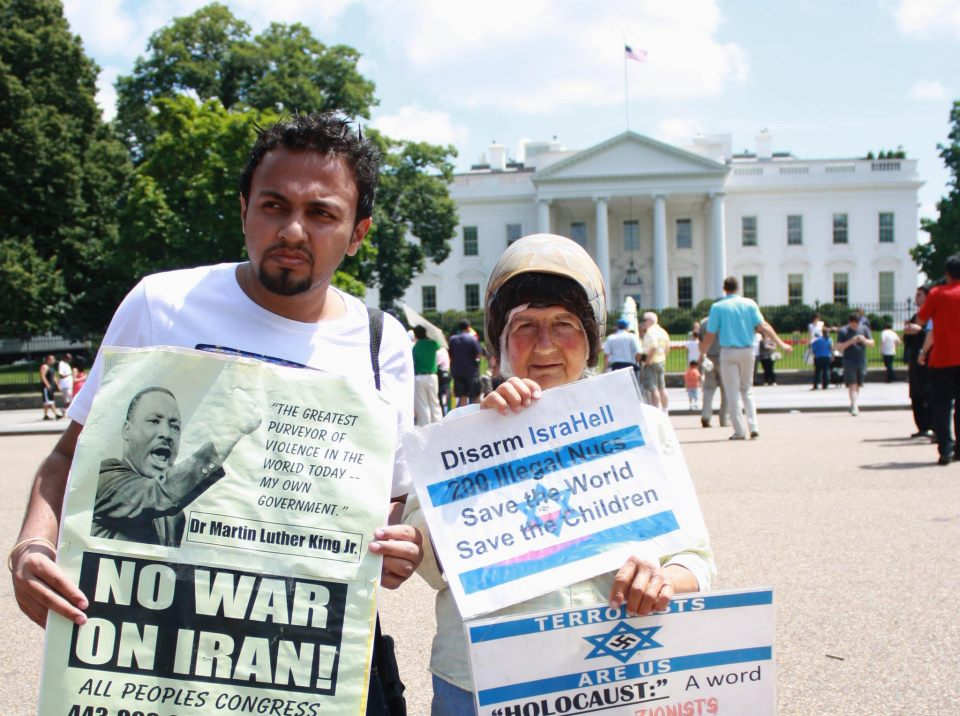
- Ammar Aziz during a protest with veteran peace activist Concepcion Picciotto in front of the White House in Washington, D.C.
- Born: Makhdoom Ammar Aziz; Lahore, Punjab, Pakistan
- Education: National College of Arts
- Occupation: Filmmaker
- Years active: 2007–present

Ammar Aziz is a Pakistani documentary filmmaker and poet. He's a recipient of the International Federation of Film Critics Award. His debut feature-length film A Walnut Tree had its world premiere at IDFA and North American premiere at Hot Docs. It won awards for the best film from Film SouthAsia, Moscow International Documentary Film Festival, and Sole Luna Doc-Film Festival. His second feature film, Discount Workers, had its world premiere at One World Film Festival and opened a film festival in Kolkata

He's a former left-wing activist. In 2014, he started an online petition against Lawrence & Wishart for claiming the copyright to Marx/Engels Collected Works.

As a filmmaker, he was initially known for his work about the working class of Pakistan. A graduate of Lahore's National College of Arts, he was the only filmmaker from Pakistan to be selected in 2012 for the Talent Campus of the Berlin International Film Festival. In 2022, he won the Berlinale Mastercard Enablement program for his organisation SAMAAJ's work on Super Sohni, an animated short series on child sexual abuse prevention in Pakistan.
