= History of the Ancient World =

1981 book by Fyodor Korovkin

- Cover of 1985 English version
- Author: Fyodor Korovkin
- Language: English
- Genre: History
- Published: 1981
- Publisher: Progress Publishers
- Publication place: Russia
- English publication date: 1985
- Media type: Print (Hardcover)
- Pages: 248 (English version)
- ISBN: 978-0-828-53155-9
- OCLC: 16133900

History of the Ancient World is a 1981 historical book written by Russian writer Fyodor Korovkin. It was first published by Progress Publishers. Subsequently, it was translated in Bengali and English respectively in 1983 and 1985.
