= Marx Library =

Marx Library may refer to:

- Marx Memorial Library, a London library and charity
- Marx Science and Social Science Library, a library at Yale University in the United States
- Karl Marx Library, a 1970s book series of Karl Marx translations and commentaries by Saul K. Padover
