= Marxists Internet Archive =

Non-profit online encyclopedia

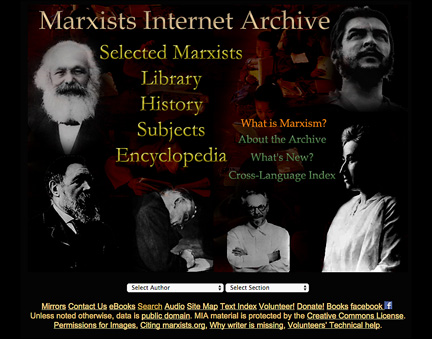
- Website type: Online encyclopedia
- Available in: 80 languages
- Website: www.marxists.org
- Commercial: No
- Launched: 1990; 36 years ago; 1993; 33 years ago (gopher site)

Marxists Internet Archive (MIA), also known as Marxists.org, is a non-profit online encyclopedia, created in 1990, that hosts a multilingual library of the works of communist, anarchist, and socialist writers, such as Karl Marx, Friedrich Engels, Vladimir Lenin, Leon Trotsky, Joseph Stalin, Mao Zedong, Rosa Luxemburg, Mikhail Bakunin, Peter Kropotkin, and Pierre-Joseph Proudhon, as well as that of writers of related ideologies, and even unrelated ones (for instance, Sun Tzu). The collection is maintained by volunteers and is based on a collection of documents that were distributed by email and newsgroups, later collected into a single gopher site in 1993. It contains over 180,000 documents from over 850 authors in 80 languages. All material in the archive is provided free of charge to users, although not necessarily free of copyright.

== History ==
=== Origins ===
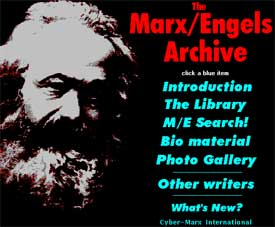
The forerunner of Marxists Internet archive was the Marx-Engels Archive, available on the Internet since 1993.

The archive was created in 1990 by a person known only by their Internet tag, Zodiac, who started archiving Marxist texts by transcribing the works of Marx and Engels into E-text, starting with the Communist Manifesto. In 1993 the accumulated text was posted on a gopher site at csf.Colorado.edu. Volunteers joined and helped spread and mirror the main archive. However, the main site and its mirrors were hosted on academic servers and by the end of 1995 almost all had been shut down.

By 1996 the website, Marx.org, was hosted by a commercial Internet service provider (ISP). This was followed by an increased activity from the volunteers. In the following years, however, a conflict developed between the volunteers working on the website and Zodiac, who retained control of the project and domain name. As the scope of the archive expanded, Zodiac feared that the opening toward diverse currents of Marxism was a "slippery slope" toward sectarianism. The volunteers who had been undertaking the work of transcribing texts resented having little influence over the way in which the archive was organized and run. In early 1998 Zodiac decided that Marx.org would return to its roots and that all writers other than Marx and Engels would be removed.

In July 1998 the present form of the Marxists Internet Archive (marxists.org) was created by volunteers transferring files and archives from Marx.org. This led to a further increase in activity and an enlargement of the scope of the archive. As for Marx.org, Zodiac closed it down in 1999, and in 2002 he gave up the domain name, which was purchased by the MIA. Along with marxists.org, the MIA can be reached by two other domain names: lenin.org and trotsky.org.

The site, and the group of volunteers working on it, has dramatically changed since its early beginnings. By 2014 it had grown to encompass 62 volunteers in 33 different countries, and held over 50,000 items in 54 languages covering the works of over 600 authors. Today the Marxists Internet Archive is a recognized repository for both Marxist and non-Marxist writers. It is listed in the OCLC WorldCat catalog, and has been selected for archiving by institutions such as the British Library, Ireland's University College Cork, and the US Library of Congress.

=== 2007 attacks ===
MIA has had problems with malicious attacks from online sources. Beginning in November 2006, the Marxists Internet Archive faced a number of serious denial-of-service attacks, attempting to exploit a misconfiguration in their server's operating system. By January 2007, the attacks had crippled much of the archive, and left volunteers with CPU issues. That the majority of systems involved in the attack were either in China or belonging to Chinese institutions led to speculation that the attacks may have been politically motivated and directed by the People's Republic of China since the website was shortly blocked in China in 2005. The severity of the attack, coupled with other hosting issues, led to the closure of the Marxists Internet Archive's main server and several of its mirrors for a number of weeks in February and March 2007.

=== Copyright issue on Marx/Engels collected works ===
In late April 2014, the small British publishers Lawrence & Wishart (L&W) chose to revoke their permission for their English language version of the Marx/Engels Collected Works to be reprinted in part on MIA. In an email in late April 2014, L&W asked MIA to delete the contested material from their website by the end of April or face litigation. MIA chose to follow the request. An online petition was started against the L&W decision, and had the support of more than 4,500 people by the end of the month. The author of the petition, Ammar Aziz, was quoted in Vice magazine: "You cannot privatize their writings—they are the collective property of the people they wrote for. Privatization of Marx and Engels' writings is like getting a trademark for the words 'socialism' or 'communism.'"

Andy Blunden, a representative of MIA, did not dispute that L&W has copyright over the material. He was quoted in the Washington D.C.–based Chronicle of Higher Education: "The professors and the historians will be able to write learned articles about what Marx said, but the general population are going to be left back in 1975 [the year when the publication of the Collected Works began]". In response to widespread criticism, L&W issued a statement objecting to the "campaign of online abuse".

On November 4th 2026, Shortly after Pluto Press acquired L&W, the MIA reinstated the entirety of the Marx/Engels Collected Works to the site.

== Structure ==
=== Management ===
The MIA is administered by a steering committee, composed of all active volunteers. The committee decides issues such as the categorization of writers, modifications to the bylaws (by 3/4 majority), financial issues of all kinds, and similar matters. Administrators are unpaid volunteers who assume additional responsibilities over certain section(s) of MIA. The MIA is incorporated in the U.S. state of California and registered with the U.S. tax service as a non-profit, 501(c)(3) organization. According to the MIA charter, its content will always be offered 100% free, in compliance with all copyright laws. All the material stored in the archives is either public domain, under the GNU Free Documentation License, or used with the copyright holders' permission. Any work created by MIA volunteers is under the Creative Commons Attribution-ShareAlike 2.0 license.

=== Physical location and mirrors ===
The website is primarily served via an ISP in Germany, and three mirrors exist, two of them in Europe (in France and Germany), and one in the United States.

=== Distribution ===
Through 2013, a 3-disc CD/DVD volume archive (containing the material on the website) was sold, although many copies were distributed every year for free to individuals and groups in developing and underdeveloped countries. These measures were not only meant to allow easy access to the material in the archive, but also as a way of ensuring the continuity of the archive. As they put it: "If the Archive is shut down by a publishing conglomerate or the government, having this information widely dispersed around the world, essentially untraceable, with the content entirely intact, is a great thing." As of March 2014, the MIA was 138 GB; it was then decided to discontinue the DVD and to distribute a portable USB hard drive that contains the entire contents of the MIA on it. The portable HDD has now also been discontinued.

=== MIA as a book publisher ===
In addition to distribution of its hard drive archives, in 2008 the MIA launched Marxists Internet Archive Publications, which has, as of October 2022, published eight titles including volumes on philosophy, social history, Soviet psychology and pedagogy, and an anthology of writings by José Carlos Mariátegui, which it distributes through Erythrós Press and Media, LLC.

== Archival structure ==
Most of material on the website is formatted in HTML, and the style of the documents is determined with CSS. PDF is sometimes used, especially for languages which don't yet have computer fonts or OCR software available. Many PDFs have been added for the purposes of putting up revolutionary and socialist publications, presented as they were printed. This has added to the bulk of the growth of the MIA.

The markup and style of the archive varies from one section to the other, depending on the volunteers who work there, but all are built on a common basic document template. The archive includes section dedicated to specific historical topics, such as the history of the Soviet Union and the Paris Commune, as well as broader subject topics, such as philosophy. It also includes a reference section called the "Encyclopedia of Marxism", containing definitions of Marxist terms, short biographies, and historical material.

The MIA is divided into a number of non-English language sections. As of 6 April 2020, the MIA website included content in 80 languages. Although each of the non-English sections is intended over time to replicate the basic structure of the main (English-language) section, in practice these vary widely in size and scope. Some of these language sections house only a few documents by Marx and Engels, while others are more extensive—for example, the Chinese section has the complete collected works of Marx, Engels, and Lenin.

== See also ==
- List of digital library projects
- List of online encyclopedias
