= New Formations =

New Formations: A Journal of Culture, Theory & Politics
- Discipline: Cultural theory
- Language: English
- Edited by: Jeremy Gilbert

Publication details
- History: 1987–present
- Publisher: Lawrence and Wishart
- Frequency: Triannual

Standard abbreviations
- ISO 4: New Form.

Indexing
- ISSN: 0950-2378 (print); 1741-0789 (web)
- LCCN: 93650684
- OCLC no.: 55052428

Links
- Journal homepage; Online access; Online archive; Online access at Project MUSE; Online access at IngentaConnect

New Formations: A Journal of Culture, Theory & Politics is a triannual peer-reviewed academic journal which covers the uses of cultural theory for the analysis of political and social issues. It is published by Lawrence and Wishart and the editor-in-chief is Jeremy Gilbert (University of East London).

== Abstracting and indexing ==
The journal is abstracted and indexed in:

- Humanities Abstracts
- International Bibliography or Art
- Academic Search Premier
- International Bibliography of the Social Sciences
- Periodicals Index Online
- Communication & Mass Media Index
- MLA International Bibliography
- Sociological Abstracts
- vLex
