= Fyodor Korovkin =

Russian history writer

- Occupation: writer
- Writing career
- Language: Russian
- Notable work: History of the Ancient World (1981)

Fyodor Korovkin is a Russian history writer well known for the book History of the Ancient World.

== Bibliography ==
- History of the Ancient World (1981)
