= Voluntary slavery =

Consensual entry into slavery

Voluntary slavery, in theory, is the condition of slavery entered into at a point of voluntary consent. It is distinguished from involuntary slavery where an individual is forced to a period of servitude, sometimes as a punishment for a crime.

== Origin ==
Some believe that in ancient times, this was a common way for impoverished people to provide subsistence for themselves or their family and provision was made for this in law. For example, the code of Hammurabi stated that "besides being able to borrow on personal security, an individual might sell himself or a family member into slavery". However, according to a different translation, "If any one fail to meet a claim for debt, and sell himself, his wife, his son, and daughter for money or give them away to forced labor: they shall work for three years in the house of the man who bought them, or the proprietor, and in the fourth year they shall be set free." This may be interpreted to mean that rather than people voluntary selling themselves into slavery in return for a loan, slavery was simply the standard penalty for failure to pay off a debt. Other parts of the Code of Hammurabi show both debt and slavery as being part of the criminal justice system of the time, such as, "If any one be too lazy to keep his dam in proper condition, and does not so keep it; if then the dam break and all the fields be flooded, then shall he in whose dam the break occurred be sold for money, and the money shall replace the corn which he has caused to be ruined."

According to some sources, in ancient times, one of the most direct ways to become a Roman or Greek citizen was by means of a self-sale contract. The laws surrounding Roman and Greek manumission made it quite possible for such erstwhile slaves to then become citizens or near-citizens themselves. However, according to Walter Scheidel, while it is possible that some genuine self-sales may have occurred in ancient Rome, the quantitative weight of such events would have been minimal. In ancient Greece, a form of voluntary slavery was associated with pederasty. Here, it was viewed as a component of reciprocal relationship wherein lovers consider voluntary servitude as legitimate, particularly in the effort to honorably satisfy the beloved in the pursuit of virtue. Voluntary servitude in this case was integral in the practice of education.

In medieval Russia, self-sale was the main source of slaves. However, as two of the reasons for self-sale in Russian history were avoidance of the military draft and avoidance of poll taxes, also known as soul taxes, it is questionable how voluntary this sort of slavery really was.

The presence of a contract does not mean that a person entered into the condition of forced labor voluntarily. For example, a report by Dr. Raingeard, speaking of the Belgian Congo, states that, "When a native, remarkably enough, managed to resist the threats and blows of the merchants, I have seen government officers offering him the choice between signing a contract and prison." According to Kevin Bales, "It may be that local custom and culture support slavery and that most of the population knows of its existence, but admitting it is something else again. Here false contracts conceal slavery. Slaveholders can easily force their slaves to sign anything: mortgages, loan agreements, indentures, or labor contracts. If questions are raised, signed contracts are produced and corrupt law enforcement looks the other way. Even in countries with mostly honest and conscientious police, the contracts hide slavery."

Even where a worker did voluntarily agree to something, the conditions at the place of work may be different from that which he agreed to. Additionally, even if only one worker agrees to something, members of his family and his descendants may be forced to comply as well. For example, some workers in Pakistan agree to make bricks in return for an advance on their paycheck under a system known as peshgi. However, once there, the kiln owner may begin to molest and even rape women of their family. Many workers feel that an assault on the women of their family voids any work agreement they might have. Accounting of the debt is often dishonest. Children may be kidnapped and held captive if the slaveholder believes the family likely to flee. The debt is frequently passed on from one generation to the next.

== Modern analysis ==
Jean-Jacques Rousseau contends that in a contract of self-enslavement, there is no mutuality. The slave loses all. The contract negates his interests and his rights. It is entirely to his disadvantage. Since the slave loses his status as a moral agent once the slave contract is enforced, the slave cannot act to enforce anything owed to him by his master. Rousseau contrasted this to the social contract, in that the subjects of the government have control over their masters. John Stuart Mill wrote a critique of voluntary slavery as a criticism of paternalism.

Libertarian Murray Rothbard criticized the term as being self-contradictory. His protege Walter Block, on the other hand, has defended the idea from Rothbard's and others' libertarian criticisms and claims this is a consistent feature of their philosophy, but admits his is a minority view, along with Robert Nozick.

The term voluntary slavery is often used in polemical writings and rhetoric on a range of subjects. For instance, critics of capitalism have argued that the capitalist wage system amounts to wage slavery disguised as voluntary, and is contrary to human dignity.

== See also ==
- Discourse on Voluntary Servitude
- Indentured servitude
- Serf
- Unpaid workers
- Wage slave
