= A Walnut Tree =

- Film poster
- Directed by: Ammar Aziz
- Produced by: Rahul Roy
- Release date: November 21, 2015
- Running time: 92 minutes
- Country: Pakistan
- Languages: Pashto, Urdu

A Walnut Tree is a Pakistani documentary film by Ammar Aziz. The film is about an internally displaced old man reminiscing about a distant homeland. The film had its world premiere at International Documentary Film Festival Amsterdam in November 2015. In the same month, the film won the award for best film from Film Southasia, Nepal. It was also officially selected for Bangalore International Film Festival, 2016.
