= Andy Blunden =

Australian philosopher (born 1945)

Andy Blunden (born 11 October 1945) is an Australian historian, writer, and Marxist philosopher, who is based in Melbourne.

== Biography ==
Blunden is a member and secretary of the Marxists Internet Archive Collective (or Marxists.org), a website which contains many Marxist and Marxist related text on history, philosophy, and politics along with many other topics. Another Internet project Blunden is involved with is the "Marx Myths & Legends". This website hosts many articles of prominent Marxian scholars and activists dealing with Karl Marx and his ideas. His published works cover topics from Georg Wilhelm Friedrich Hegel to post-structuralism to ethics and politics. Blunden is a self-described "Hegelian Marxist with a 'pragmatist twist' using Lev Vygotsky".

== Works ==
=== Books ===
- Beyond Betrayal. 1991.
- Stalinism: Its Origin & Future. Marxists.org. 1993.
- Meaning of Hegel's Logic. 1997. At Wikisource.
- Ethical Politics. Heidelberg Press. 2003. Archived from the original on 10 February 2016.
- An Interdisciplinary Theory of Activity. Leiden: Brill, 2010 (hardback); Chicago: Haymarket Books, 2012 (paperback).
- Selected Writings on the Semiotics of Modernity. Erythros Press and Media. 2012.
- Concepts: A Critical Approach. Leiden: Brill, 2012 (hardback); Chicago: Haymarket Books, 2014 (paperback).
- Collaborative Projects. An Interdisciplinary Study. (editor) Leiden: Brill, 2014 (hardback); Chicago: Haymarket Books, 2016 (paperback).
- The Origins of Collective Decision Making. Leiden: Brill, 2016 (hardback); Chicago: Haymarket Books, 2017 (paperback).
- Hegel for Social Movements. Brill. 2019.
- Hegel, Marx & Vygotsky. Essays in Social Philosophy. 2021.

=== Contributions ===
- "Foreword" to Georg Wilhelm Friedrich Hegel, Hegel's Logic: Being Part One of the Encyclopaedia of the Philosophical Sciences. [1830] Marxists Internet Archive Publications, 2009.

== See also ==
- Aleksei N. Leontiev
- Critical Psychology
- Cultural-Historical Activity Theory (CHAT)
- Cultural-historical psychology
- Kharkov School of Psychology
- Vygotsky Circle
