= William Lazonick =

Canadian economist

Lazonick in 2025

William Harold Lazonick (born in Toronto, Canada on June 8, 1945) is an academic economist who studies innovation, corporate governance, and competition in the global economy.

== Education ==
Lazonick was an undergraduate at the University of Toronto, receiving a Bachelor of Commerce (BCom) degree in May 1968. He then attended the London School of Economics, earning a Master of Science (M.Sc.) in Economics with a Mark of Distinction in July 1969. From 1969 to 1970, he was enrolled in the doctoral program at the Institut Universitaire de Hautes Études Internationales (Graduate Institute of International Studies) in Geneva. After studying economics in Canada, Britain, and Switzerland, he decided that it was a subject that had to be conquered at the “belly of the capitalist beast”, and therefore he entered the PhD program at Harvard University in September 1970. Lazonick completed his Ph.D. in economics in November 1975, writing his doctoral dissertation on Marxian theory and the development of the labor force in England. Lazonick was made an Honorary Doctor of Philosophy at Uppsala University in 1991 and at the University of Ljubljana in 2016. In 2020, he received the University College, University of Toronto, Alumni of Influence Award.

== Employment ==
Lazonick’s first academic appointment was as assistant professor of economics at Harvard University from 1975 to 1980. He was promoted to associate professor of economics in 1980 and was visiting professor of economics at the University of Toronto in 1982-1983. He spent two years on research grants at Harvard Business School, including as the 1984-1985 Harvard-Newcomen Business History Research Fellow followed by a year funded by fellowships from the German Marshall Fund of the United States and the U.S. National Science Foundation. From 1985 to 1993, he was a tenured professor of economics at Barnard College, Columbia University. In 1989-1990, he was a visiting member in social sciences at the Institute for Advanced Study in Princeton. He was visiting professor of economics at Harvard University in 1992.

In 1993, Lazonick decided to join the University of Massachusetts Lowell, located within Boston’s Route 128 industrial district, after several conversations with its chancellor, William Hogan. He was appointed University Professor, with a mandate to build a program in regional economic and social development. He co-founded the University’s Department of Regional Economic and Social Development (RESD), which offered a highly successful and globally unique Master’s program, until, after the retirement of Chancellor Hogan, a politician-turned-chancellor abolished RESD in 2010. Since 2018, Lazonick has been UMass professor of economics emeritus. In 2010, Lazonick co-founded the Academic-Industry Research Network (AIRnet), a 501(c)(3) non-profit think tank based in Cambridge, Massachusetts, serving as its president from its launch to the present.

During his time at UMass, Lazonick was also professor of economics at the University of Tokyo (1996-1997) as well as visiting scholar (1996–2001) and then distinguished research professor (2001–2007) at INSEAD in France. He was a visiting professor at the faculty of economics at the University of Ljubljana from 2010 to 2017, and professeur associé at the Telecom School of Management in Paris from 2014 to 2023. At various times, Lazonick taught graduate courses at University of Oslo, Norwegian Business School (BI), University of Bordeaux, University of Toulouse, University of Venice, and University of Toronto. Since 2016, he has been professorial research associate at SOAS University of London.

=== The Academic-Industry Research Network ===
In 2010, Lazonick started a 501(c)(3) organization called the Academic-Industry Research Network, also known as AIRnet, which publishes research by Lazonick and other academics. The organization seeks to foster research regarding economic development, and ways it can become more sustainable and inclusive. Much of Lazonick's research has been funded by the Institute for New Economic Thinking.

== Research ==
Innovation

Professor Lazonick is the originator of "the theory of innovative enterprise", which focuses on the interaction of strategic control, organizational integration, and financial commitment in the generation of higher-quality,,lower-cost products than previously available. He has published an autobiographical article on his development of his perspective in a 2026 volume of essays published the International Schumpeter Society.

=== Financialization ===
Much of Lazonick's research has been devoted to stock buybacks and the financialization of economies. This began during his time at Harvard in the 1980s, where he became a critic of agency theorists such as Michael C. Jensen, who became a major proponent of mass stock buybacks. Since then, Lazonick has publicly advocated against such buybacks through various research papers and articles, becoming a major voice regarding the matter.

Lazonick began this line of research in the late 1980s, becoming an early critic of the belief that companies should be run to maximize shareholder value. In collaboration with Mary O'Sullivan, he continued this work in the 1990s at STEP Group, a research organization directed by Keith Smith in Oslo, Norway, and in the last half of the 1990s and early 2000s at INSEAD, where he directed the European Commission project Corporate Governance, Innovation, and Economic Performance.

==== Impact on innovation ====
Lazonick's 2009 book Sustainable Prosperity in the New Economy? Business Organization and High-Tech Employment in the United States, published by the Upjohn Institute for Employment Research, won the 2010 Schumpeter Prize, awarded by the International Joseph A. Schumpeter Society. His article,"Profits Without Prosperity; Stock Buybacks Manipulate the Market and Leave Most Americans Worse Off," won the HBR-MacKinsey Award for outstanding article in Harvard Business Reviewi in 2014.
