= Jeff Schmidt (writer) =

American physicist

Jeff Schmidt is a physicist who wrote the 2000 book Disciplined Minds, a critique of the socialization and training of professionals.

== Termination of employment controversy ==
Schmidt was fired from his job of 19 years as an associate editor for Physics Today, the magazine of the American Institute of Physics (AIP), on allegations that he wrote the book on his employer's time. The book starts: "This book was stolen. Written in part on stolen time, that is." Schmidt contended, however, that he was fired for "protesting discriminatory hiring practices" at AIP, and that the "stolen time" quotation was an exaggerated allusion to counterculture icon Abbie Hoffman, who wrote Steal This Book. He added that "writing this radical book during break time in the office felt like stealing time because the ideas that I was expressing seemed so out of place with the corporate-type atmosphere of the office." Schmidt's firing led to a public campaign, with 750 physicists and academics, including Noam Chomsky, signing a letter supporting Schmidt.

== Legal settlement ==
The public campaign in turn led to a legal case, carried by Washington Lawyers Committee for Civil Rights and Urban Affairs, a law firm specializing in civil liberties, that produced an undisclosed financial settlement for Schmidt, including anti-discrimination policy changes at AIP. even though AIP did not admit any wrongdoing, it admitted that Schmidt "consistently received positive job reviews" and rehired Schmidt, who immediately resigned.
