= Moral Minds =

2006 book by Marc Hauser

Moral Minds: How Nature Designed Our Universal Sense of Right and Wrong
- Author: Marc D. Hauser
- Language: English
- Subject: Ethics, Morality, Anthropology, Evolution, History of Science and Philosophy of Biology
- Publisher: Ecco press
- Publication date: 22 August 2006
- Media type: Print
- ISBN: 0-06-078070-3
- OCLC: 70407915
- Dewey Decimal: 171/.7 22
- LC Class: BJ1012 .H348 2006

Moral Minds: How Nature Designed Our Universal Sense of Right and Wrong is a 2006 book by former Harvard psychologist Marc Hauser in which he develops an empirically grounded theory to explain morality as a universal grammar. He draws evidence from evolutionary biology, moral and political philosophy, primatology, linguistics, and anthropology.

Hauser uses artificial moral dilemmas as a research strategy. The reason is that people already have moral judgments of real world cases such as abortion and euthanasia, so there is no intuition left. In artificial moral dilemmas intuition plays an important role. A second advantage of artificial cases is that they can be subtly modified to allow observation of their effects on people's moral judgments. There is an internet version of the test called the Moral Sense Test which is aimed at a worldwide public.
