= Marc Hauser =

American biologist

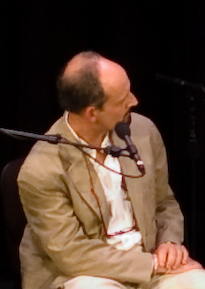
- Hauser in 2008
- Born: October 25, 1959 (age 66)
- Citizenship: United States
- Known for: Scientific research misconduct
- Scientific career
- Fields: Biology, Primate behavior, Animal cognition, Neuroscience, Evolutionary psychology
- Workplaces: Harvard University

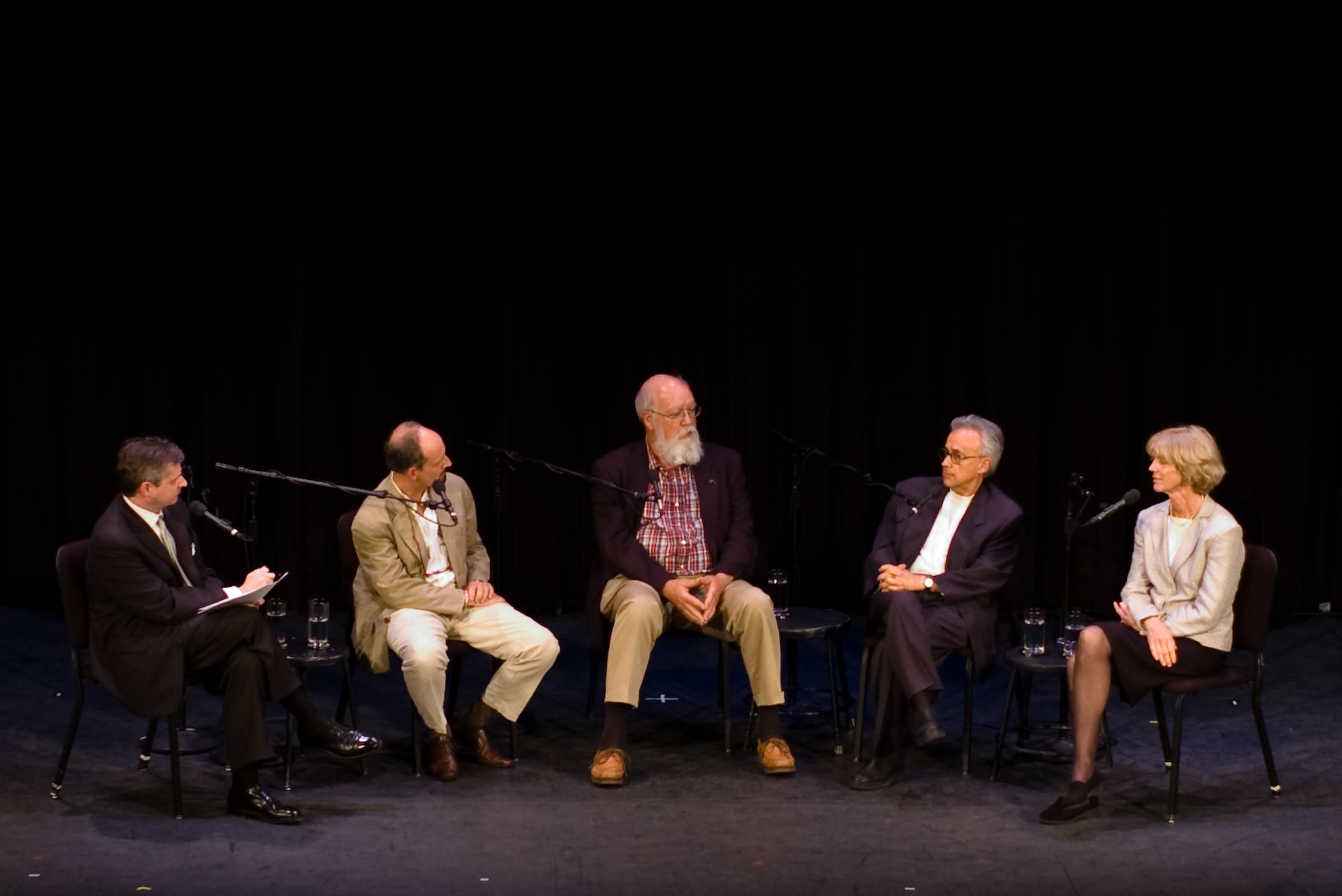
Marc Hauser sitting between Jon Meacham (far left) and Daniel Dennett (center), World Science Festival

Marc D. Hauser (born October 25, 1959) is an American evolutionary biologist and a researcher in primate behavior, animal cognition and human behavior and neuroscience. Hauser was a professor of psychology at Harvard University from 1998 to 2011. In 2010 Harvard found him guilty of research misconduct, specifically fabricating and falsifying data, after which he resigned. Because Hauser's research was financed by government grants, the Office of Research Integrity of the Health and Human Services Department also investigated, finding in 2012 that Hauser had fabricated data, manipulated experimental results, and published falsified findings.

== Research and publications ==
Hauser's research topics include evolutionary biology, cognitive neuroscience, cognitive evolution, and language evolution. Hauser's internet-based 'The Moral Sense Test' involved presenting participants a series of hypothetical moral dilemmas and requesting them to provide a judgment. Since his resignation from Harvard, Hauser has continued to publish his research in the fields of cognitive neuroscience and comparative psychology and also in the field of education.

=== Books and essays ===
Books

- The Evolution of Communication (1996)
- Wild Minds: What Animals Really Think (2000)
- Moral Minds: How Nature Designed Our Universal Sense of Right and Wrong (2006)
- Evilicious: Cruelty = Desire + Denial (2013)

== Scientific misconduct ==
In 2007, Harvard University announced an internal investigation of alleged scientific misconduct by Hauser. On August 20, 2010, Michael Smith, Dean of Harvard's Faculty of Arts and Sciences, released a statement confirming that an internal investigation had found Hauser guilty of eight counts of scientific misconduct. Three counts involved published papers, and five involved unpublished studies. The statement said that Harvard was cooperating with further investigations by the US Office of Research Integrity, the National Science Foundation Office of Inspector General, and the U.S. Attorney for the District of Massachusetts. They stated that they would conduct their own review and make their conclusions available to the public.

While Harvard confirmed that Hauser committed misconduct, scientists continued to criticize Harvard over a lack of transparency in the investigation. However, Harvard stated that "in cases where the government concludes scientific misconduct occurred, the federal agency makes those findings publicly available." The lack of transparency evoked substantial speculation. Writing in The New York Times in August 2010, Nicholas Wade summarized:

There is a wide spectrum of scientific sins, ranging from wrist-slap offenses like bad data storage at one end, to data fabrication at the other. It is still not clear where on this spectrum Dr. Hauser's errors may fall. He has admitted only to unspecified "mistakes," not to misconduct.

Although Hauser took a year-long leave of absence from Harvard in 2010, he was at first still planning to teach at the Harvard Extension School, which generated further controversy. On September 1, 2010, his classes at the Extension School were canceled. In April 2011, he was barred from teaching in the Psychology department or any other Arts and Sciences department. In July 2011, Hauser resigned his faculty position at Harvard, effective August 1, 2011. In his resignation, Hauser stated that he had "some exciting opportunities in the private sector" involving education for high-risk teenagers, but that he might go back to academia "in the years to come."

In September 2012, after conducting a separate investigation, the Office of Research Integrity (ORI) found Hauser guilty of scientific misconduct. They concluded that Hauser had fabricated data in one study, manipulated results in multiple experiments, and incorrectly described how studies were conducted. The ORI barred Hauser from certain types of research and required that other research be conducted under supervision. They published a notice stating:

Notice is hereby given that the Office of Research Integrity (ORI) has taken final action in the following case:
Marc Hauser, Ph.D., Harvard University: ORI found that Dr. Marc Hauser … engaged in research misconduct in research supported by

- National Center for Research Resources (NCRR)
- National Institutes of Health (NIH), grants P51 RR00168-37 and CM-5-P40 RR003640-13,
- National Institute on Deafness and Other Communication Disorders (NIDCD), NIH, grant 5 R01 DC005863
- National Institute of Mental Health (NIMH), NIH, grant 5 F31 MH075298.

In two additional published papers, some field notes or video recordings were "incomplete", although Hauser and his co-author replicated the experiments. The Proceedings of the Royal Society published the replication of the missing data in an addendum to one of the papers. In April 2011 Hauser and Justin Wood (coauthor of the original paper) replicated the results of the 2007 Science study and published them—as an addendum—in the journal.

=== Unreplicable cotton-top tamarin study ===
In 1995, Hauser reported that cotton-top tamarins can recognize themselves in a mirror. Gordon G. Gallup questioned Hauser's findings, and reviewed some video recordings of Hauser's experiment, saying that "when I played the videotapes [for Hauser's experiments], there was not a thread of compelling evidence — scientific or otherwise — that any of the tamarins had learned to correctly decipher mirrored information about themselves." Upon requesting the remaining videotapes, Gallup was informed that the other tapes had been stolen. Together with Anderson, Gallup published a critical response to Hauser's article. Their criticism of Hauser's paper stated that the coding criteria were described in insufficient detail to code the monkeys' behavior and that, according to their assessment, the cotton-top tamarins did not show the behavior that they considered as evidence for mirror recognition in chimpanzees or other great apes.

Hauser and a co-author published a reply to these criticisms, clarifying their coding criteria. However, in 2001 Hauser reported that his subsequent attempts to replicate the experiments were unsuccessful, observing no evidence for the previously claimed result.

The paper was published in the journal Cognition in 2002 and was later retracted.

=== Additional reactions ===
In August 2010, after the initial allegations came out, various publications published other accusations and speculations about Hauser's research, often citing reports by his former students and research assistants.

Michael Tomasello, another well-known animal cognition researcher, claimed that some of Hauser's previous students personally told him that there "was a pattern and they had specific evidence". Tomasello also stated, prior to the official announcement, that he had information from "a Harvard faculty member and from former students of Dr. Hauser" that the investigation found evidence for eight counts of scientific misconduct; this statement was later confirmed by Harvard's dean (see previous section).

The Chronicle of Higher Education reported the contents of allegations made by a former research assistant of Hauser. The former research assistant stated that Hauser falsely coded videotapes of monkey behavior, resisted research assistants and students' requests to have them re-coded by another observer and pressured his students to accept his data analysis. When they re-coded the data without Hauser's permission, they allegedly found Hauser's coding bore little relation to what was on the tapes. According to the document, several other lab members had similar run-ins with Hauser.

An article in New Scientist claimed that Harvard opened its investigation of Hauser's lab after students who had worked there made allegations of data falsification.

Gerry Altmann, the editor of Cognition, subsequently posted his personal conclusion that Hauser fabricated data as part of a deception, after being given a summary of the relevant portions of Harvard's inquiry. Altmann noted that the conclusion of fabrication was his own conjecture, and not that of the Harvard investigation, which offered no explanation for discrepancies between the video record and the published paper.

== See also ==
- List of scientific misconduct incidents
