= Marx/Engels Collected Works =

English edition of the works of Karl Marx and Friedrich Engels in 50 volumes

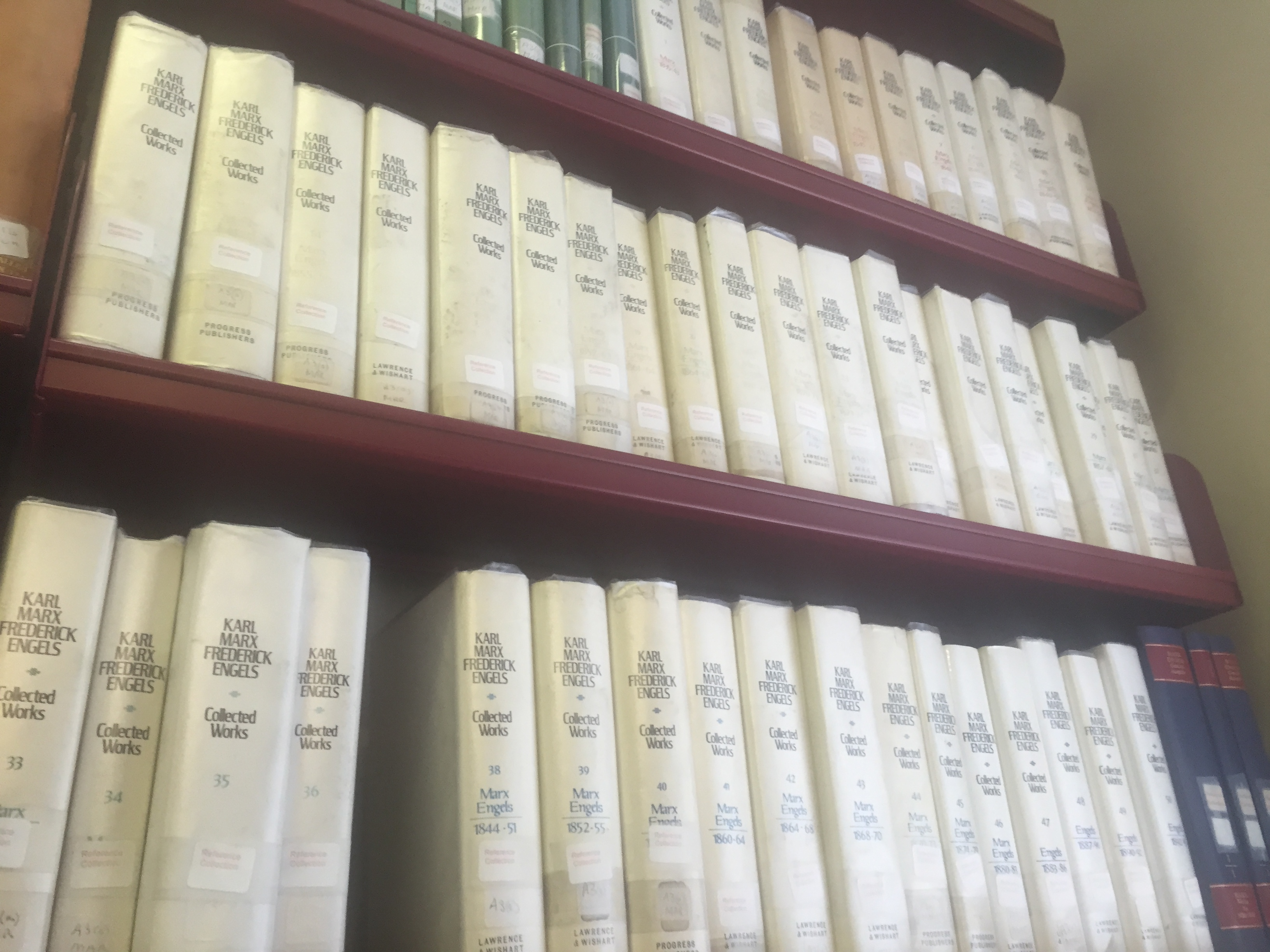
MECW volumes on a bookshelf

Marx/Engels Collected Works (also known as MECW) is the largest existing collection of English translations of works by Karl Marx and Friedrich Engels. Its 50 volumes contain publications by Marx and Engels released during their lifetimes, many unpublished manuscripts of Marx's economic writings, and extensive personal correspondence. The Collected Works, for the most part compiled by the Institute of Marxism-Leninism of the Central Committee of the Communist Party of the Soviet Union, was issued from 1975 to 2004 by Progress Publishers (1931, Moscow) in collaboration with Lawrence and Wishart (1936, London) and International Publishers (1924, New York City).

== History and overview ==
Although about a third of Marx and Engels' works were originally written in English and partly published in the British or American press, the vast majority of their literary legacy was not collected, translated (where necessary) and made available in an extensive English edition for decades after their death.

In the Soviet Union, comprehensive collections of the works of Marx and Engels were already compiled in the 1920s and 1930s (an aborted complete edition, MEGA^{1}, as well as a first Russian edition in 28 volumes, Sochineniya^{1}). But only following the publication of new editions in Russian and German in the 1950s and 1960s (Sochineniya^{2} and Marx-Engels-Werke with 39 basic volumes and a few more supplementary ones later on), an English edition begun being prepared by Soviet editors with the help of the publishing houses of the Communist Parties in Great Britain and the USA and translators from these countries.

After general editing principles had been agreed upon by the representatives of all three sides (Institute of Marxism-Leninism and Progress Publishers, Moscow, the Central Committees of the CPs in Great Britain and the US and their publishers Lawrence and Wishart, London, and International Publishers, New York) at a conference in Moscow in December 1969, the first volume of the new edition was published in 1975.

More than forty volumes were published before the fall of the USSR; the few remaining ones were completed and issued by 2004 (V. 50).

Large parts of both authors' early writings, many of their newspaper articles (e.g. from the Neue Rheinische Zeitung 1848-49) and most of their letters as well as many of Marx's economic manuscripts were published in English for the first time in the Collected Works. In total, the 50 volumes comprise 1,968 works and other documents (of which 805 were published in English for the first time) and 3,957 letters (of which 2,283 had never been published in English before).

The Collected Works consists of writings by Marx between 1835 and his death in 1883, and by Engels between 1838 and his death in 1895. Early volumes (V. 1-2) include juvenilia, such as correspondence between Marx and his father, Marx's poetry, and letters from Engels to his sister. The edition also contains several major, well-known works by Marx and Engels, such as The Condition of the Working Class in England (V. 4), The Communist Manifesto (V. 6), The Eighteenth Brumaire of Louis Napoleon (V. 11), and Anti-Dühring (V. 25).

The collection is divided into three parts. Volumes 1-27 collect the political, philosophical, historical and journalistic writings of the authors, in chronological order. Volumes 28-37 specifically collect Marx's writings on political economy, including a large amount of draft material and manuscripts which culminated in the three volumes of Capital (V. 35-37). Finally, volumes 38-50 collect the letters and personal correspondence of the authors.

== Contents by volume ==
Although most of MECW's volumes include material written by Marx and Engels (whether separately or as co-authors), a large minority of volumes are devoted to material written by only one author. Red check marks indicate the author's presence in a volume, while black X marks indicate that the author's work is absent. Although the volumes typically contain large varieties of material, only major selected items are listed below, for illustration.

Volume	Marx	Engels	Period	Pub. Date	Major Contents
1	check	☒	1835–1843	1975	Early writings of Marx, including doctoral dissertation The Difference Between the Democritean and Epicurean Philosophy of Nature
2	☒	check	1838–1842	1975	Early writings of Engels
3	check	check	1843–1844	1975	Early writings of both, including the Economic and Philosophic Manuscripts of 1844, Critique of Hegel's Philosophy of Right
4	check	check	1844–1845	1975	The Holy Family, The Condition of the Working Class in England
5	check	check	1845–1847	1976	The German Ideology, Theses on Feuerbach
6	check	check	1845–1848	1976	The Communist Manifesto, The Poverty of Philosophy, Principles of Communism
7	check	check	1848	1977	Articles for Neue Rheinische Zeitung
8	check	check	1848–1849	1977	Articles for Neue Rheinische Zeitung
9	check	check	1849	1977	Articles for Neue Rheinische Zeitung
10	check	check	1849–1851	1978	The Class Struggles in France 1848–1850, The Peasant War in Germany
11	check	check	1851–1853	1979	The Eighteenth Brumaire of Louis Napoleon, Revolution and Counter-Revolution in Germany
12	check	check	1853–1854	1979	Newspaper articles concerning global politics and other writings, including The Civil War in the United States
13	check	check	1854–1855	1980	Newspaper articles concerning global politics and other writings, including The Civil War in the United States
14	check	check	1855–1856	1980	Newspaper articles concerning global politics and other writings, including The Civil War in the United States
15	check	check	1856–1858	1986	Newspaper articles concerning global politics and other writings, including The Civil War in the United States
16	check	check	1858–1860	1980	Newspaper articles concerning global politics and other writings, including The Civil War in the United States
17	check	check	1859–1860	1981	Newspaper articles concerning global politics and other writings, including The Civil War in the United States
18	check	check	1857–1862	1982	Newspaper articles concerning global politics and other writings, including The Civil War in the United States
19	check	check	1861–1864	1984	Newspaper articles concerning global politics and other writings, including The Civil War in the United States
20	check	check	1864-1868	1985	Articles and writings concerning the First International, Value, Price and Profit (V. 20)
21	check	check	1867– 1870	1985	Articles and writings concerning the First International, Value, Price and Profit (V. 20)
22	check	check	1870–1871	1986	Articles and writings concerning the First International, Value, Price and Profit (V. 20)
23	check	check	1871–1874	1988	Articles and writings concerning the First International, Value, Price and Profit (V. 20)
24	check	check	1874–1883	1989	Critique of the Gotha Program, Socialism: Utopian and Scientific
25	☒	check	—	1987	Anti-Dühring, Dialectics of Nature
26	☒	check	1882–1889	1990	Origin of the Family, Ludwig Feuerbach and the End of Classical German Philosophy
27	☒	check	1890–1895	1990	Late political writings of Engels
28	check	☒	1857–1861	1986	Grundrisse, A Contribution to the Critique of Political Economy
29	check	☒	1857– 1861	1987	Grundrisse, A Contribution to the Critique of Political Economy
30	check	☒	1861–1863	1988	Economic Manuscripts of 1861–1863, which includes Theories of Surplus Value
31	check	☒	1861–1863	1989	Economic Manuscripts of 1861–1863, which includes Theories of Surplus Value
32	check	☒	1861–1863	1989	Economic Manuscripts of 1861–1863, which includes Theories of Surplus Value
33	check	☒	1861–1863	1991	Economic Manuscripts of 1861–1863, which includes Theories of Surplus Value
34	check	☒	1861–1864	1994	Economic Manuscripts of 1861–1863, which includes Theories of Surplus Value
35	check	☒	—	1996	Capital, Volume I
36	check	☒	—	1997	Capital, Volume II
37	check	☒	—	1998	Capital, Volume III
38	check	check	1844– 1851	1982	Letters
39	check	check	1852–1855	1983	Letters
40	check	check	1856–1859	1983	Letters
41	check	check	1860–1864	1985	Letters
42	check	check	1864–1868	1987	Letters
43	check	check	1868–1870	1988	Letters
44	check	check	1870–1873	1989	Letters
45	check	check	1874-1879	1991	Letters
46	check	check	1880–1883	1992	Letters
47	☒	check	1883–1886	1995	Letters
48	☒	check	1887–1890	2001	Letters
49	☒	check	1890–1892	2001	Letters
50	☒	check	1892–1895	2004	Letters

== Differences with other Marx/Engels collections ==
Although the Collected Works is the most comprehensive English translation of Marx and Engels' work, it is not their complete work. An ongoing project to publish the pair's complete works in their original language (Marx-Engels-Gesamtausgabe) is expected to require 114 volumes. However, as MEGA differs from MECW particularly in content in that it presents numerous excerpts and notes in its fourth section, publishes the letters to Marx and Engels from third persons, and prints various editions of the same works (e.g. Capital), the overwhelming majority of the published writings, manuscripts, and letters of Marx and Engels are in any case included in MECW.

== See also ==
- Marx-Engels-Gesamtausgabe (MEGA), a project in progress to publish the complete untranslated works of Marx and Engels with extensive critical apparatus.
- The Karl Marx Library, an aborted 13 volume series edited by Saul K. Padover, terminated in 1977.
