= Lawrence & Wishart =

British publishing company

- Founded: 1936; 90 years ago
- Country of origin: UK
- Headquarters location: London
- Distribution: Central Books
- Publication types: Books, academic journals
- Official website: www.lwbooks.co.uk

Lawrence & Wishart is a British publishing company formerly associated with the Communist Party of Great Britain. It was formed in 1936 through the merger of Martin Lawrence, the Communist Party's press, and Wishart Ltd, a family-owned left-wing and anti-fascist publisher founded by Ernest Wishart, father of the painter Michael Wishart.

== Publications ==
Journals published include:

- Anarchist Studies
- New Formations
- Renewal
- Socialist History
- Soundings
- Twentieth Century Communism
- FORUM: for comprehensive education.

== History ==
Founded in 1936, Lawrence & Wishart initially became involved with the political and cultural life of the popular front, publishing literature, drama and poetry, as well as political economy, working-class history and the classics of Marxism. Book series published during the first decade included the Little Lenin Library and the Little Stalin Library.

After the Second World War, the company published work from the CPGB's History Group, including early work by Eric Hobsbawm. Later in the century, Lawrence & Wishart began its project of commissioning translations of selected writings by Antonio Gramsci, whose work on the relationship between politics and culture has ongoing significance for the company. The first volume dedicated to Gramsci, Selections from the Prison Notebooks, was published in 1971, and re-published in 2005.

The mid-1980s saw the publication of works by writers who brought the insights of cultural studies to bear on more traditional political concerns with ideology, politics and power, a field of research that ultimately led to the range of journals that Lawrence & Wishart now publish.

John Newsinger wrote that the Communist vendetta against George Orwell's Homage to Catalonia was maintained as recently as 1984, when Lawrence & Wishart published Inside the Myth, a collection of essays "bringing together a variety of standpoints hostile to Orwell in an obvious attempt to do as much damage to his reputation as possible."

== Lawrence & Wishart today ==
Continuing to publish the journals New Formations, Anarchist Studies, Renewal, Twentieth Century Communism, and Soundings, Lawrence & Wishart are also developing their work with online books. Recent online publications have included Regeneration, on generational politics, and the Soundings collection The Neoliberal Crisis. The company has also published books with a number of partners, including Compass, the International Brigade Memorial Trust, the Marx Memorial Library, the Socialist History Society, UNISON and Unite the Union.

In August 2016, Lawrence & Wishart moved premises from Central Books in Hackney Wick to new premises in Chadwell Heath. The move was a result of a combination of increased rents within Hackney Wick due to gentrification and regeneration of the area due to the construction of the Queen Elizabeth Olympic Park; and the convenience of the company to remain close to Central Books, who are also Lawrence & Wishart's distributor.

== Copyright issue on Marx/Engels Collected Works ==
The Marx/Engels Collected Works (MECW) were published by Lawrence & Wishart, in collaboration with Progress Publishers of Moscow and International Publishers of New York City, between 1975 and 2004 in 50 volumes. This was and remains the most complete attempt at rendering their work in English.

According to Andy Blunden, a volunteer at the Marxists Internet Archive (MIA), Lawrence & Wishart allowed the website to publish material from the MECW around 2005, but it was always an option of the publishers to revoke permission. This finally happened at the end of April 2014, when the publishers asked via email for the deletion of 1,662 files from the website, threatening legal action if MIA did not comply. Lawrence & Wishart has argued that the free reprints on MIA will affect its plans to issue MECW in a digital version in the near future, and its action is purely to ensure that it remains in business.

By the end of April 2014, more than 4,500 individuals had signed a petition objecting to Lawrence & Wishart's decision to take action against MIA. In response to the criticism, Lawrence & Wishart in a statement said it had been "subject to a campaign of online abuse".
