= Progress Publishers =

Soviet publisher

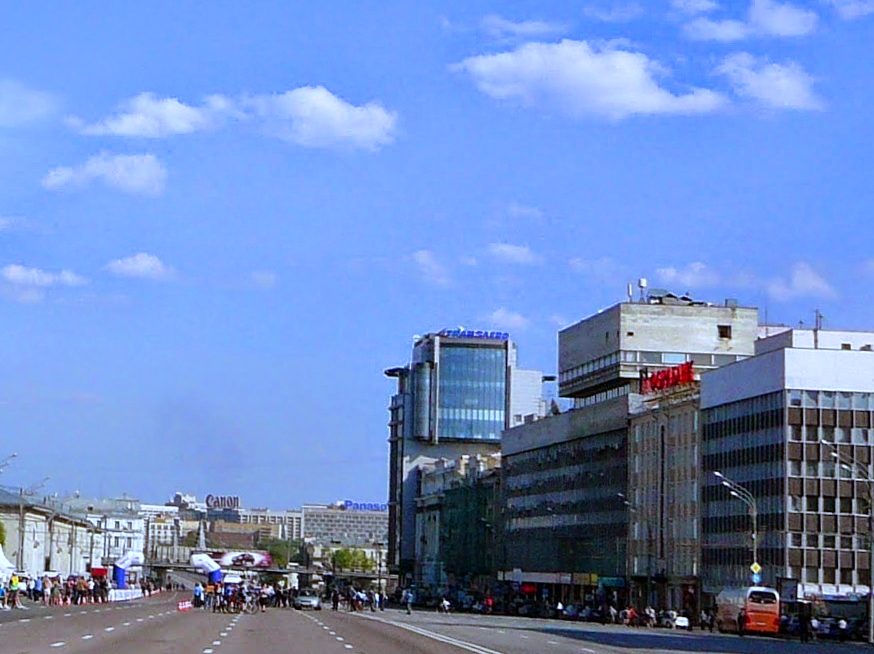
- Type: Publisher
- Founded: 1931
- Headquarters: Moscow, Russia
- Products: Books
- Website: moscow.progresspublishers.org

Progress Publishers is a Moscow-based Soviet, and later Russian, publisher founded in 1931. It is still in existence today.

== Publishing program ==
Progress Publishers published books in a variety of languages: Russian, English, and many other European and Asian languages. They issued many scientific books, books on arts, political books (especially on Marxism–Leninism), classic books, children's literature, novels and short fiction, books in source languages for people studying foreign languages, guidebooks and photographic albums.

Progress Publishers joined with International Publishers in New York and the Communist Party of Great Britain's publishing house, Lawrence and Wishart, in London to publish the 50-volume Collected Works of Karl Marx and Frederick Engels, a project launched in 1975 and completed only in 2004.

Other books published in English by Progress included Marx and Engels on the United States (1979), a compilation drawn from letters, articles, and various other works, and A Short History of the USSR (1984).

One of the common features of all Progress books was their "request to reader" to send an opinion and suggestions on the book. It reads:

REQUEST TO READERS. Progress Publishers would be glad to have your opinion of this book, its translation and design and any suggestions you may have for future publications. Please send all your comments to 17, Zubovsky Boulevard, Moscow, U.S.S.R.

== Book series ==
- ABC of Social and Political Knowledge
- Books About the USSR
- Classics of Russian Literature
- Current International Problems
- Imperialism: Acts, Facts, and Records
- Impressions of the USSR
- International Communist and Working-Class Movement
- V. I. Lenin: Collected Works
- Library of Political Knowledge
- Library of Soviet Literature
- Man Through the Ages
- Modern Working-Class Novels Series
- On the Track of Discovery
- Progress Books about the USSR
- Progress Guides to the Social Sciences
- Progress Marxist–Leninist Theory
- Progress Military Series
- Progress Problems of the Third World (also known as: Problems of the Third World)
- Progress Russian Classics Series (also known as: Russian Classics Series)
- Progress Soviet Authors Library
- Russian Readers for Beginners
- Scientific Socialism Series
- Socialism Today
- Soviet Foreign Policy and International Relations
- Soviet Literature for Young People
- Soviet Military Thought Series
- Soviet Novels Series
- Soviet Short Stories Series
- Stormy Petrel Series
- Student's Library
- Theories and Critical Studies
- War Memoirs

== See also ==
- International Publishers
- Lawrence and Wishart
