= Adolf Rutenberg =

German journalist

- Born: October 30, 1808; Berlin, Germany
- Died: December 6, 1869 (aged 61); Berlin, Germany

Adolf Friedrich Rutenberg (30 October 1808 – December 1869) was a German geography teacher, Young Hegelian and journalist. He was a close friend of German philosophers Karl Marx and Max Stirner. He was alongside Bruno Bauer as one of two reported mourners at Stirner's graveside.

== Biography ==
Rutenberg was the son of Adolph Friedrich Rutenberg, a shoemaker from Mecklenburg, and his wife Dorothea Elisabeth Dohrmann, who had moved to Berlin shortly before his birth and acquired local citizenship. He attended the Friedrich Wilhelm Gymnasium, where he met Bruno Bauer, who was one year above him and later became his brother-in-law. He studied philosophy, philology and theology from 1828 to 1831 at the Humboldt University of Berlin. In the winter of 1828/29, he attended Georg Wilhelm Friedrich Hegel's lectures on aesthetics and philosophy of history. In 1831, he transcribed Hegel's lecture on the philosophy of religion.

After passing his exams in philosophy, philology and theology, Rutenberg taught at various schools in Berlin for nine years. From 1838, he taught geography at the cadet school in Neuen Friedrichstraße, but was dismissed two years later for "drunkenness" and/or "political reasons". He then worked for various magazines, including Arnold Ruge's Hallische Jahrbiicher.

In Berlin he joined the Doctor's Club, a philosophical debating circle of young lecturers and students in advanced semesters, among which Karl Marx, Karl Friedrich Köppen, Bruno and Edgar Bauer, and Ludwig Buhl. At this time, he developed a close friendship with Marx, describing Marx to his father as "the most intimate of Berlin's friends".

On 25 March 1838, Rutenberg married Anna Bertha Spiller, the 25-year-old daughter of a locksmith, in Berlin. Their daughter Agatha was born in the same year on 10 December and baptized on 3 February 1839 at St. Nicholas Church, Berlin. He later had two sons: the lawyer Adolph Bruno (b. 5 April 1840) and the sculptor Walter (b. 29 December 1858).

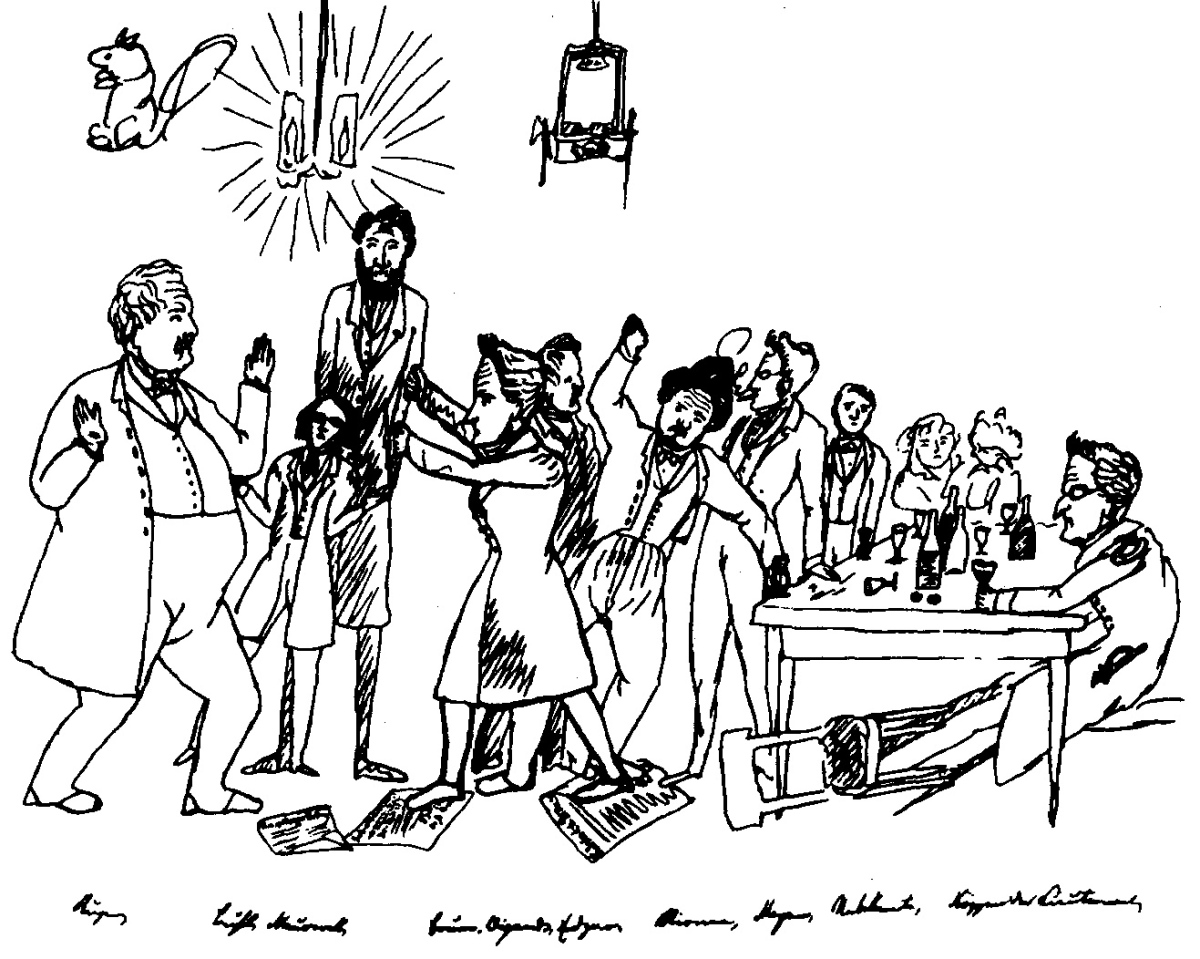
Die Freien, a group on which Rutenberg participated in the 1840s

In November 1841 Georg Jung invited Rutenberg to be the first editor of the Rheinische Zeitung. On 2 February 1842, upon the suggestion of Karl Marx, he became the newspaper's editor-in-chief in Cologne. He was responsible for editorial articles about Germany and Prussia. In September 1842, during the celebrations of the rebuilding of the Cologne Cathedral, Hoffmann von Fallersleben visited Rutenberg. However, the editorial board became dissatisfied with Rutenberg and on 15 October 1842 dismissed him and replaced him with Marx. He then returned to Berlin and joined a circle called Die Freien ("The Free [Ones]"), of which Max Stirner also took part.

Rutenberg was later invited by Carl Theodor Welcker to contribute to his geopolitical encyclopedia Staatslexikons: Encyklopädie der sämmtlichen Staatswissenschaften für alle Stände. He wrote the articles "Poland", "Prussia (Statistics)"; "Serbia (History)"; "Sina, China"; "Turkey, Ottoman Empire" and "Radical, Radicalism". Journalist and historian Gustav Mayer praised the latter.

On 1 April 1848, he founded the National-Zeitung in Berlin, which he edited until the September Crisis of 1848. He took an active role in the March Revolution.

During his last years, he worked as a journalist for the Preußische (Adler) Zeitung (1851-1853) and the Royal Prussian State Gazette (1851-1871) and is said to have turned to the National Liberals.
