= Carl Nauwerck =

German journalist (1810–1891)

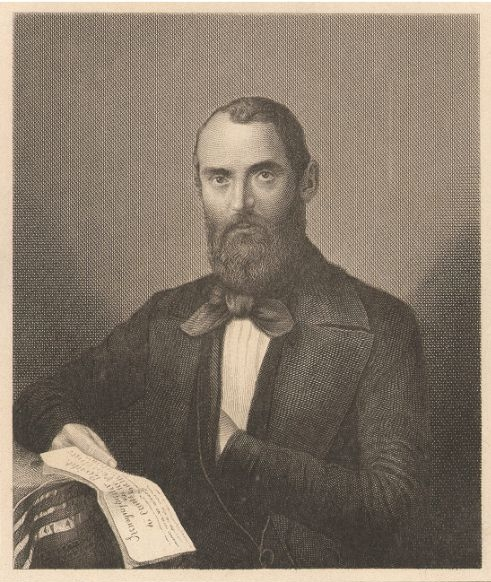
- Born: Ludewig Gottlieb Carl Nauwerck; March 26, 1810; Salem, Duchy of Holstein
- Died: July 7, 1891 (aged 81); Riesbach (now Zürich), Switzerland

Philosophical work
- Era: 19th-century philosophy
- Region: Western philosophy
- School: Young Hegelians

Ludewig Gottlieb Carl Nauwerck (German: [ˈnaʊvɛʁk]; 26 March 1810 – 7 July 1891) was a German journalist, orientalist and member of the Frankfurt Parliament.

== Biography ==
Carl Nauwerck was born the illegitimate son of Marie Dorothee Zink, a mason's daughter, and Ludwig Nauwerck. After graduating from the cathedral school in Ratzeburg, he studied orientalism and evangelical theology from 1828 to 1831 at several universities, including Humboldt, Bonn and Jena; his academic career included membership in the Alten Bonner Burschenschaft, a traditional student's association (Burschenschaft). He received his PhD at Halle in 1834, becoming a professor the following year in Berlin. With a license to teach Arabic literature and the history of philosophy, he was employed from 1836 to 1844 as a Privatdozent at the Philosophical Faculty. He was a member of the Doctorklub (Graduates' Club), along with Karl Marx, Bruno and Edgar Bauer.

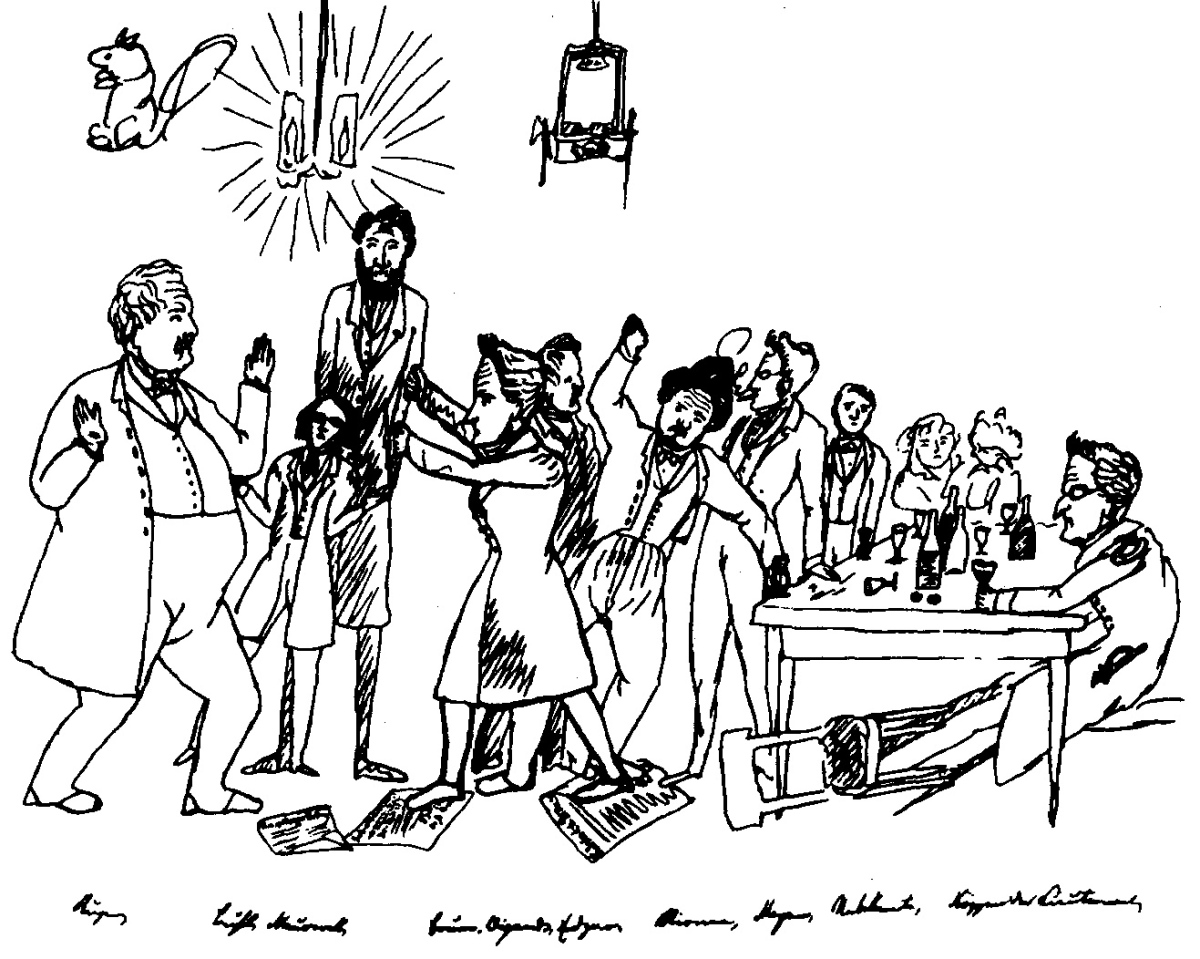
Die Freien, a group of which Nauwerck (here the third from left to right) was a member.

Nauwerck wrote an article for the magazine Athenäum and was an eager contributor to another one, the Hallische Jahrbücher. From 1842 to 1843 he was a correspondent for the Rheinische Zeitung. In 1844, he became a member of the Central Association for the Welfare of the Working Classes. In the same year, he was banned from teaching because of his liberal opinions about Friedrich Wilhelm IV, who demanded consequences for the "patented revolutionary". His students protested against that sanction. He later worked as a free opinion writer in Berlin. From 1847 to 1848, he served in the city council of Berlin, where he represented, along with Julius Berends, the "highest democracy".

In 1848, he was elected for the two constituencies of the 5th Province of Brandenburg (Berlin, Georgenvorstadt) in the Paul's Church Parliament. He attended every session and was an eager debater. He was a member of the faction Deutscher Hof and later joined the Central March Association. He was primarily committed to fundamental rights, foreign policy for Polish solidarity, opposed Danish feudal supremacy in the Schleswig–Holstein question and supported the independence of Italy. Regarding domestic policy, he spoke against unemployment. He advocated for the right to work and criticized the so-called "leonine societies" (Leoninischer Verträge).

With the failure of the German revolutions of 1848–1849, he fled to Switzerland, where he lived in Bönigen and Thun and from 1850 in Rechberg. From 1850 to 1851, he was an editor of Actionair, an economic policy insert of the Neue Zürcher Zeitung. From 1859 he managed a tobacco cigar business. In 1851, he was sentenced to death in absence for his participation in the Paul's Church Parliament, but would receive amnesty ten years later in 1862. He was a co-editor of the newspaper Der deutsche Eidgenosse along with Gottfried Kinkel. From 1862 to 1877, he was a member and later president of the German Aid Society in Zurich.

He died in 1891 in the town of Riesbach, which became a borough of Zürich shortly after.

== Family ==
On 5 July 1840, he married Angelica Julia Coelestina Dubois (29 September 1816 – 15 October 1900) in Neustrelitz. He had six children:

- Robert Carl Cölestin Nauwerck (born 25 March 1841),
- Gabriela Johanna Sophie Amalie Luise Nauwerck (7 September 1842 – 14 May 1908);
- Arnold Carl Julius Ludwig Nauwerck (born 12 July 1845);
- Ludwig Emmanuel Carl Alexander Nauwerck (6 July 1847 – 17 December 1916),
- Coelestin Nauwerck (1853–1938);
- another unnamed child.
