= The Principles of Communism =

1847 work written by Friedrich Engels

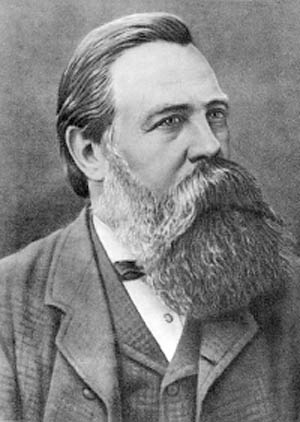
Engels, 1877

Principles of Communism (German: Grundsätze des Kommunismus) is a brief 1847 work written by Friedrich Engels, the co-founder of Marxism. It is structured as a catechism, containing 25 questions about communism for which answers are provided. In the text, Engels presents core ideas of Marxism such as historical materialism, class struggle, and proletarian revolution. Principles of Communism served as the draft version for the Communist Manifesto.

Principles of Communism was composed during October–November 1847, and was preceded by the Draft of a Communist Confession of Faith, a very similar but distinct text which Engels had previously written in June 1847. Like Principles, the earlier Confession of Faith also used the catechism convention, but with only 22 question-answer pairs. On Engels' recommendation, the catechism format was ultimately rejected in favor of a historical prose narrative, which was used by Karl Marx to compose the Manifesto. All three documents were attempts to articulate the political platform of the newly-forming Communist League, a political party which was being created through the merger of two ancestors: the League of the Just, and the Communist Correspondence Committee, the latter led by Marx and Engels. The Manifesto emerged as the best-known and final version of the Communist League's mission statement, drawing directly upon the ideas expressed in Principles. In short, Confession of Faith was the draft version of Principles of Communism, and Principles of Communism was the draft version of The Communist Manifesto.

== Background ==
During the early 19th century, the effects of the Industrial Revolution inspired utopian socialists to theorize improved forms of social organization based upon cooperation, as opposed to free market competition; such theorists included Robert Owen and Charles Fourier. Additionally, radical groups sought to overthrow the existing European social order in favour of similar goals. These parties also lamented harsh labour conditions.

One such organization was the League of the Just, which formed in 1836 by splitting off from an ancestor, the League of Outlaws, which had formed in Paris in 1834. The League collaborated with like-minded groups to plan a violent overthrow of the existing social order, in order to bring about their own ideal society, which they referred to as the "new Jerusalem". However, the League was not composed of industrial wage labourers or proletarians in the Marxist sense, but instead of journalists, political radicals, and craftsmen whose livelihoods were being displaced by the Industrial Revolution. The League structured itself in chapters divided into local cells, typically of five to ten individuals.

In November 1842, Engels and Marx met each other for the first time in Cologne, at the office of the Rheinische Zeitung, a newspaper that Marx was editing at the time. Nothing came of this first encounter, but during 1842–43, both had separately contacted the League, though neither joined. In 1844, Engels and Marx met a second time, at the Café de la Régence in Paris. This second meeting was the one which began their lifelong friendship and collaboration, which started with the production of The Holy Family and The German Ideology. In 1846, Engels and Marx began their own organization, the Communist Correspondence Committee, and sought other groups for the practical application of their political goals. Again in 1846, Marx invited the League's Paris and London branches to join as chapters of the Committee, and the League reciprocated by inviting Marx's Brussels branch of the Committee to join as a chapter of the League and to assist with political reorganization. By early 1847, the League and the Committee had aligned.

At two important congresses during 1847 (2–9 June and 29 November-8 December), the two groups merged into one, which now called itself the Communist League. For each of these congresses, Engels drafted versions of a political platform for the new organization. The first version, Draft of a Communist Confession of Faith, was discussed and approved at the first June congress; Marx was not present at the June congress, but Engels was. This first draft, unknown for many years, was rediscovered in 1968. The second draft, Principles of Communism, was then used at the second November/December congress. Both drafts used a catechism question-and-answer format, with which Engels had grown dissatisfied. Immediately before the second congress, describing Principles, Engels wrote to Marx recommending a further re-draft, in historical prose:

"Give a little thought to the Confession of Faith. I think we would do best to abandon the catechetical form and call the thing Communist Manifesto. Since a certain amount of history has to be narrated in it, the form hitherto adopted is quite unsuitable. I shall be bringing with me the one from here, which I did; it is in simple narrative form, but wretchedly worded, in a tearing hurry. I start off by asking: What is communism? And then straight on to the proletariat – the history of its origins, how it differs from earlier workers, development of the antithesis between the proletariat and the bourgeoisie, crises, conclusions."

— Engels, letter to Marx, 23/24 November 1847

Following the second congress of the Communist League, it commissioned Marx to write a final program. Drawing directly upon the ideas in Principles of Communism, Marx delivered a final revision, the Manifesto, in early 1848. Although Marx was the exclusive author of the Manifesto's manuscript, the ideas were adapted from Engels' earlier drafts, with the result that the Manifesto was credited to both authors.

== Synopsis ==
Beginning with a definition of communism as a political theory for the liberation of the proletariat, Engels provides a brief history of the proletariat as the 19th century working class. Ideas are developed in a sequential and logical progression, within the frame of the question-answer style. A given question's answer implies further questions, which are phrased subsequently.

Engels explains the origins of the proletariat as a result of the Industrial Revolution. He describes its differences from other historical poor classes, its precarious and miserable daily life, and its opposition to the owning class, or bourgeoisie. Eventually, all people must inevitably fall into one social class or the other, with the large majority of humanity becoming proletarians. A solution is presented: the abolition of private property. Such abolition is now possible, where previously it was not, because of the newly existing capacity for mass production. This productive capacity can be reorganized to provide for all on a basis of cooperation, as opposed to market competition. Engels predicts that unfortunately, such social reorganization will have to be carried out using violence, because the bourgeoisie will not voluntarily give up its power. Moreover, due to the global character of the Industrial Revolution, such violence must eventually and necessarily occur in all countries, not being limited to some.

When carried out on a sufficiently wide scale, Engels predicts that the abolition of private property will be a panacea for social ills, as effort previously wasted in competition will be redeployed to the benefit of all. As a result, class and ethnic differences among humanity will gradually dissipate over time, and religion will be rendered superfluous as a historical artefact. Engels also asserts that communism will not have harmful effects upon women or the family, as critics fear. Quite the opposite, Engels rejects critics' fears that communism implies a "community of women", a 19th century euphemism which means that several men may have sex with a given group of women. On the contrary, Engels asserts that such an exploitative "community of women" already exists under the existing social order, based in private property and money, which communism will overthrow: prostitution. Engels therefore dismisses the fear as hypocritical, intimating instead that the abolition of private property will eliminate prostitution, thereby emancipating women.

Because the Communist Manifesto is a redrafting of Principles, it contains many of the same ideas. One difference between the documents is that in the Manifesto, Marx first emphasizes historical technological development and the rise of the bourgeoisie, introducing the proletariat second, whereas in Principles, Engels began by detailing the proletariat.

== Adaptation: from Confession to Principles to Manifesto ==
This table shows the reorganization and expansion of material which began with Engels' Confession of Faith, continued with his Principles of Communism, and which concluded with the Manifesto as re-drafted and completed by Marx. (Note: Engels' work Principles of Communism reflects the next stage in the elaboration of the programme of the Communist League following the "Draft of a Communist Confession of Faith". This new version of the programme was worked out by Engels on the instructions of the Paris circle authority of the Communist League. The decision was adopted after Engels' sharp criticism at the committee meeting, on October 22, 1847, of the draft programme drawn up by the "true socialist" M. Hess, which was then rejected. Comparison of the text of the Principles of Communism with that of the "Draft of a Communist Confession of Faith" proves that the document written by Engels at the end of October 1847 is a revised version of the Draft discussed at the First Congress of the Communist League. The first six points of the Draft were completely revised. Engels had felt compelled at that time to make some concessions in them to the as yet immature views of the League of the Just leaders. Some of these points were omitted in the Principles, others substantially changed and put in a different order. In the rest, the arrangement of both documents coincides, though there are several new questions in the Principles: 5, 6, 10–14, 19, 20 and 24–25. In his book Birth of the Communist Manifesto, Dirk J. Struik notes that the occasional vagueness in the Draft (e.g., the answer to Question 5: "each human being is in search of happiness") was improved upon in the Principles, which offered more detailed, concrete answers. The Principles of Communism constituted the immediate basis for the preliminary version of the Communist Manifesto. In his letter of November 23–24, 1847 to Marx, Engels wrote about the advisability of drafting the programme in the form of a communist manifesto, and rejecting the catechism format. In writing the Manifesto, the two founders of scientific socialism used propositions formulated in the Principles of Communism.) First, the Confession of Faith's material was reorganized and slightly expanded with new matter (dash marks) to give rise to Principles. In many cases, parallel sections of the first two drafts had identical, or near-identical text. Since the Manifesto had both a different primary author (Marx) and a different narrative form, its redrafting process was more significant. Effectively, Principles' first half was rephrased as the Manifesto's first section, its second half was rephrased as the Manifesto's second section, its penultimate question-answer pair was significantly expanded to become the Manifesto's third section, and its final question-answer pair was rephrased as the Manifesto's fourth and final brief section.

Due to their brevity, all questions are reproduced verbatim from the English translation given below. The answers are significantly longer and therefore summarized here, except for the first, which is the shortest.

Confession	Principles of Communism			Manifesto
Q&A	Q&A	Question	Answer (Summary)	Section
1-2	1	What is Communism?	Communism is the doctrine of the conditions of the liberation of the proletariat.	Preamble
7	2	What is the proletariat?	The 19th century working class, which lives by selling its labor, deriving no profit from capital.	I
8	3	Proletarians, then, have not always existed?	No. Although there have always been poor people, they have not previously lived under today's specific historical circumstances.	I
9	4	How did the proletariat originate?	The industrial revolution of the 18th century gave rise to heavy machinery and mass production, enriching the owners and impoverishing the workers. This led to the owning class, or bourgeoisie, and the proletariat.	I
–	5	Under what conditions does this sale of the labor of the proletarians to the bourgeoisie take place?	The tendency is for the proletariat, on average, to be paid a subsistence wage.	I
–	6	What working classes were there before the industrial revolution?	There were slaves, serfs, handicraftsmen, and manufacturing workers.	I
10	7	In what way do proletarians differ from slaves?	Slaves are sold discretely, proletarians sell themselves continuously-daily and hourly, via wage labor. Slaves are outside competition; proletarians are subjected to the whims of market competition.	I
11	8	In what way do proletarians differ from serfs?	Serfs are provided land by lords, which they are expected to farm, giving a portion of the product to the lord. Thus, serfs have an assured existence which proletarians lack.	I
12	9	In what way do proletarians differ from handicraftsmen?	The handicraftsman is poised to rise or fall, and may enter either the bourgeoisie or the proletariat.	I
–	10	In what way do proletarians differ from manufacturing workers?	Manufacturing workers were rural, proletarians urban. Manufacturing workers had their own tools and equipment, proletarians do not.	I
–	11	What were the immediate consequences of the industrial revolution and of the division of society into bourgeoisie and proletariat?	New machinery rapidly upset global commerce. A new machine invented in Europe now has the ability to put many people in a far-off country, such as China, out of work. The bourgeoisie became the preeminent class, even above nobility.	I
–	12	What were the further consequences of the industrial revolution?	Periodic commercial crises due to overproduction.	I
–	13	What follows from these periodic commercial crises?	Large-scale human misery, even for the bourgeoisie. But, the new capacity for mass production can be reorganized, to the benefit of all, with a new and different social order.	I
3–6	14	What will this new social order have to be like?	It must take control of industry away from mutually competing owners and redeploy it for overall societal benefit on a new cooperative basis. Thus, private property must be abolished.	II
13	15	Was not the abolition of private property possible at an earlier time?	No. Different property relations prevailed in the past. Also as mass production did not previously exist, the said abolition could not have been usefully carried out in the past, to the benefit of all. Now, such is possible.	II
14	16	Will the peaceful abolition of private property be possible?	This is desirable, but it is unrealistic. History is predictable. Unfortunately, a violent struggle will be necessary in order to abolish private property.	II
15	17	Will it be possible for private property to be abolished at one stroke?	No. The abolition must be gradual, as resources become available to the common good through expropriation via revolution.	II
16–19	18	What will be the course of this revolution?	It will entail a constitution, dominance of the proletariat, and 12 specific points which include gradual abolition of private property, the centralization of credit and money, and universal education.	II
–	19	Will it be possible for this revolution to take place in one country alone?	No. Since capitalism has led to globalization of trade, it has created a global proletariat. Revolution must eventually be carried out in every country on Earth, beginning in Western Europe, where the industrial revolution began.	II
–	20	What will be the consequences of the ultimate disappearance of private property?	It will be a panacea for all social ills. Effort previously wasted in market competition will be redeployed to provide for all. Society will become classless, and distinctions between rural and urban life will also vanish.	II
20	21	What will be the influence of communist society on the family?	It will make relations between the sexes purely private, eliminating familial property-relations via state education. It will also not bring about a "community of women", as some critics hypocritically fear.	II
21	22	What will be the attitude of communism to existing nationalities?	Ethnic and national differences will eventually dissipate through co-mingling of peoples, just as class differences will.	II
22	23	What will be its attitude to existing religions?	Religions have historically been expressions of human development-so-far. But communism is the stage of social development which will make religion superfluous, causing its disappearance.	II
–	24	How do communists differ from socialists?	There are three relevant types of socialists. Reactionary and bourgeois socialists are antagonistic to communist aims, and must be fought. Democratic socialists may sometimes usefully align with communists.	III
–	25	What is the attitude of the communists to the other political parties of our time?	There are several international groups with whom communists may collaborate on friendly terms, including the Chartists and the National Reformers.	IV
