= Rheinische Zeitung =

German newspaper

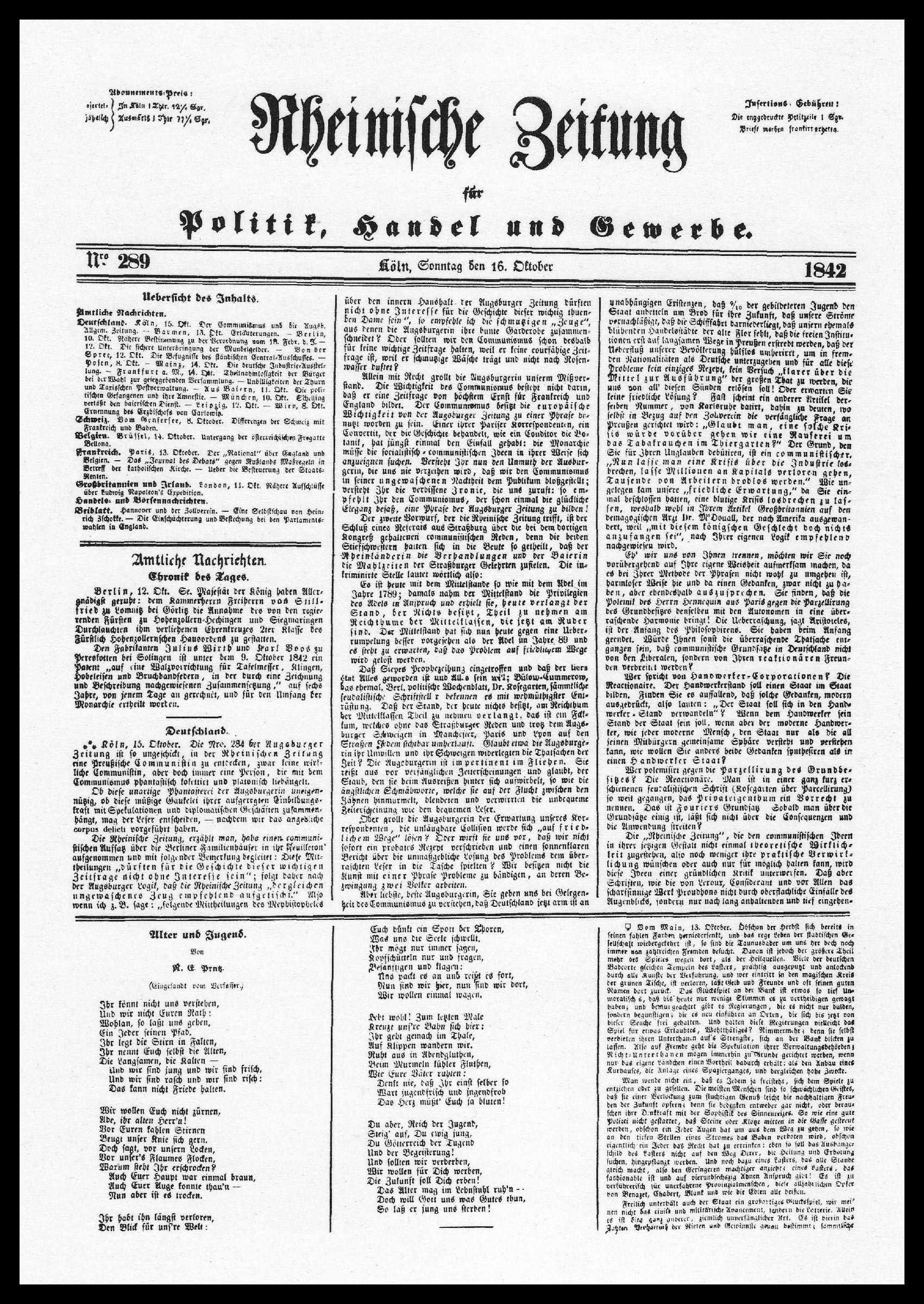
Front page of the Rheinische Zeitung, 16 October 1842

The Rheinische Zeitung ("Rhenish Newspaper") was a 19th-century German newspaper, edited most famously by Karl Marx. The paper was launched in January 1842 and terminated by Prussian state censorship in March 1843. The paper was eventually succeeded by a daily newspaper launched by Marx on behalf of the Communist League in June 1848, called the Neue Rheinische Zeitung ("New Rhenish Newspaper").

== Publication history ==
=== Background ===
The city of Cologne (Köln) has long been the most important urban center of the region of Germany known as Rhineland. During the decade of the 1830s a newspaper called the Kölnische Zeitung ("Cologne Newspaper") emerged as the voice of the Catholic political opposition based in that city. The protestant Prussian government, based in Berlin, considered this newspaper and its 8,000 subscribers a thorn in its side, and looked favorably upon attempts by others to establish new newspapers to undercut the Kölnische Zeitung's dominant position.

A series of papers had been launched in Cologne, each failing, with the powerful Kölnische Zeitung generally buying out its fledgling competitors. One of this series of hapless rivals was a newspaper launched in Cologne in December 1839 called the Rheinische Allgemeine Zeitung ("Rhenish General Newspaper"). The paper struggled for two years without successfully gaining a foothold and seemed headed for extinction. When it was evident that the newspaper was becoming bankrupt soon, George Jung and Moses Hess convinced some leading rich liberals of the Rhineland, like Camphausen, Mevissen and Oppenheim to establish a company to buy out the newspaper. The sub-heading was "For politics, Commerce and Industry'. The shareholders initially chose Friedrich List as editor but were declined due to his health problems. Then the editorship was offered to Gustav Höfken, while Hess given the post of sub-editor.

At the eleventh hour a group of prominent Cologne citizens decided to raise fresh working capital and to attempt to reestablish the paper on a new basis. This new version of the old Rheinische Allgemeine Zeitung was to be known as the Rheinische Zeitung ("Rhenish News").

=== Establishment ===
The Rheinische Zeitung was launched on 1 January 1842, with Moses Hess serving as an editor. The paper originally expressed a pro-government stance, but its political line soon shifted to better accord with popular sentiment among Rhinelanders, many of whom regarded the Prussian government in Berlin as an oppressive alien entity.

Although living in Bonn at the time of the paper's launch, Karl Marx seems to have been aware of the project from its inception and he began contributing articles to its pages, which drew notice from among the paper's readers. These articles would be the first of Marx's writings (beside his doctoral dissertation) to be published for the public. Previously fixated upon questions of abstract philosophy, Marx was first introduced to practical journalism in the course of writing for the Rheinische Zeitung. It was during this period, too, that Marx first came into contact Moses Hess and with French socialist ideas.

In the pages of the Rheinische Zeitung Marx had criticized the failings of the Rhineland Diet, seated at Düsseldorf, charging it with implementing class-based legislation which negatively impacted the rights and prosperity of common citizens in favor of a privileged stratum of landowners. In long articles Marx was additionally critical of the Diet's failings to advance the cause of freedom of the press, as well as its refusal to publish its own proceedings. Far from revolutionary at this juncture, Marx retained a faith that public debate in a free press would be sufficient to ameliorate the various evils facing society regardless of the Diet's weakness.

The government was agitated by the Rheinische Zeitung but did not take the step of forcing its closure, hoping instead that the paper would die on its own. This seemed a reasonable assessment, as by the middle of August 1842 the paper's subscriber list had dwindled to just 885. However, on 15 October 1842, Marx was appointed to the editorial board and the Rheinische Zeitung began an apparent rise from the ashes gaining nearly 1,000 subscribers over the course of the next month.

Marx analyzed the debate of the Rhineland Diet dealing with the alleged theft of wood by the peasantry—a topic which Marx later recalled "provided the first occasion for occupying myself in the economic questions." Frederick Engels, who first established close personal relations with Karl Marx in 1844, later affirmed that it was Marx's journalism at the Rheinische Zeitung which led him "from pure politics to economic relationships and so to socialism."

=== Suppression ===
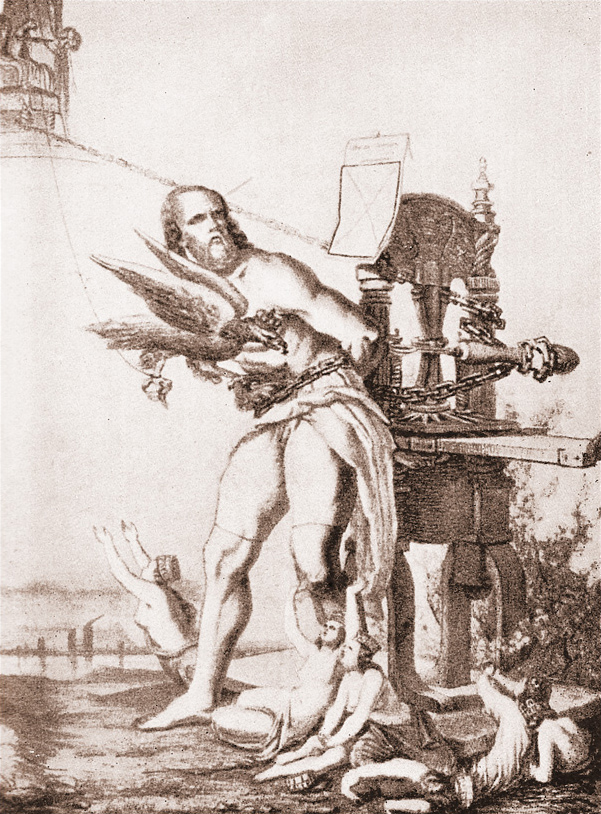
German political cartoon from the time of the 1843 closure of the Rheinische Zeitung, showing Karl Marx as Prometheus, bound to a printing press while the royal eagle of Prussian censorship rips out his liver

With the paper's fortunes on the rise, the Rheinische Zeitung continued to draw the government's ire, with the publication in January 1843 of a series of articles documenting the government's refusal to take seriously the complaints of the local peasantry. A defiant tone of some published correspondence and growing sentiment for democracy among the populace further alienated the authorities. On 21 January 1843 the Cabinet, with the King in attendance, decided that the Rheinische Zeitung should be suppressed.

The intelligentsia of the Rhineland saw the suppression of the newspaper as a personal affront and a delegation was sent to Berlin in an attempt to forestall the paper's final closure. Subscriptions had risen to more than 3,000—very few German papers of the day were larger and none more widely quoted. Moreover, thousands of citizens signed petitions calling for the publication's continuation.

Regardless of the appeals of the citizenry on behalf of the paper, King Friedrich Wilhelm IV refused to grant an audience to hear a personal appeal and the mass of public petitions gathered were pointedly ignored.

In desperation shareholders in the paper demanded that the Rheinische Zeitung tone down its aggressive political line, a move which prompted Marx to submit his resignation as editor on 17 March 1843. The local censor was enthusiastic about this change in the newspaper's staff, noting that a "really moderate though insignificant man" named Oppenheim had taken over the editorial chair and recommending that the decision to close the paper be reversed. The paper was shut down regardless on 31 March.

=== Legacy ===
In the view of historian David Fernbach, the suppression of the paper in March 1843 by the Prussian government shattered Marx's belief that the country could traverse the road from monarchy to constitutional democracy without revolutionary struggle.

In the aftermath of the suppression of the original Rheinische Zeitung, Marx had left Germany altogether, landing in Paris where a new publishing proposal awaited him. Marx would spend the next five years in France, Belgium, and England, waiting for a suitable moment to make a return to his native Rhineland.

Marx would return to Cologne during the first half of April 1848, amidst the Revolutions of 1848 in the German states and immediately began to make preparations to establish a new—and more radical—newspaper. This publication, launched on June 1, would be known as the Neue Rheinische Zeitung ("New Rhenish News").

== Employees and writers of the Rheinische Zeitung ==
- Berthold Auerbach
- Bruno Bauer
- Edgar Bauer
- Karl Heinrich Brüggemann
- Friedrich Engels
- Moritz Fleischer
- Julius Fröbel
- Karl Heinzen
- Georg Herwegh
- Moses Hess
- August Heinrich Hoffmann von Fallersleben
- Karl Friedrich Köppen
- Karl Marx
- Eduard Meyen
- Wolfgang Müller von Königswinter
- Carl Nauwerck
- Robert Prutz
- Adolf Friedrich Rutenberg
- Adolf Stahr
- Max Stirner

== See also ==
- Young Marx
- Neue Rheinische Zeitung
