= Edgar Bauer =

German writer, journalist and political philosopher (1820–1886)

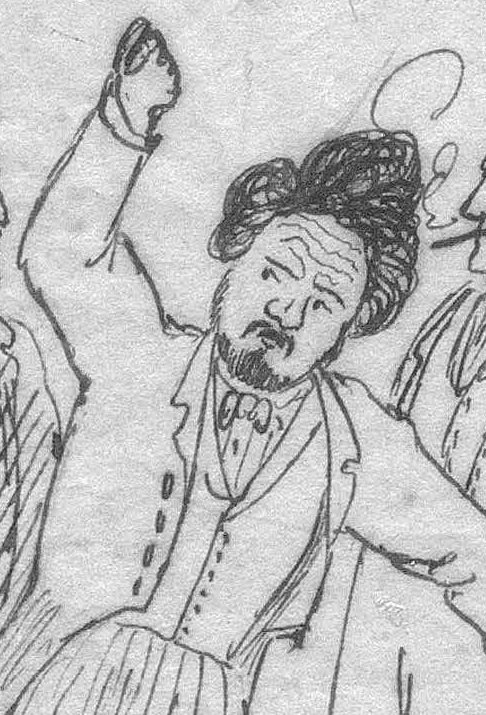
- Portrait of Bauer at a meeting of Die Freien by Friedrich Engels, 1842
- Born: 7 October 1820; Charlottenburg, Province of Brandenburg, Kingdom of Prussia
- Died: 18 August 1886 (aged 65); Hanover, Province of Hanover, Kingdom of Prussia
- Other name: Martin von Geismar
- Occupations: Writer, journalist
- Relatives: Bruno Bauer (brother)

Education
- Education: University of Berlin

Philosophical work
- Era: 19th-century philosophy
- Region: Western philosophy
- School: Young Hegelians
- Notable works: Critique's Quarrel with Church and State (1843)

Edgar Bauer (7 October 1820 – 18 August 1886) was a German writer, journalist and political philosopher associated with the Young Hegelians. The younger brother of Bruno Bauer, he became known in the 1840s for radical political and anti-religious writings. His 1843 book Critique's Quarrel with Church and State led to a conviction for sedition and four years' imprisonment in the fortress of Magdeburg.

After his release, Bauer took part in the German revolutions of 1848–49, becoming active in Berlin's democratic and radical political circles. Following the defeat of the revolution, he went underground and lived in exile in Hamburg, Altona, Denmark and later London. During his London years he worked as a journalist, moved among German political émigrés including Karl Marx, and from 1852 supplied reports on the émigré milieu to the Danish authorities while also publishing in support of the Danish position in the Schleswig–Holstein question. After the Prussian amnesty of 1861 he returned to Berlin, where he became editor of the Preußisches Volksblatt and continued to write on Denmark's behalf before the Second Schleswig War. In his later years, Bauer moved from his earlier anti-religious radicalism toward Christian and conservative journalism, a turn that marked a lasting break with his brother Bruno. After returning to Altona in 1869, he wrote in defense of Schleswig-Holstein church autonomy under Prussian rule before settling in Hanover in 1873.

In his early writings Bauer remained within the Young Hegelian milieu and was associated with anti-theism, radical democracy and socialism. Marx and Engels polemicized against him and his brother in The Holy Family (1844) and The German Ideology (1846). Some later anarchist writers treated Bauer's early work as an influence on German anarchism.

== Life and career ==
=== Early life ===
Edgar Bauer was born on 7 October 1820 in Charlottenburg. He came from a Thuringian family. His father F. G. Ch. Bauer was a porcelain painter in Eisenberg. In 1815, his father was appointed to Charlottenburg, where he served as director of an expanded painting workshop he had established, remaining in that post until his death in 1853.

Bauer's mother was Eleonore Karoline Wilhelmine Reichardt, whom Bauer's father married on 7 February 1809 after the early death of her sister Juliane Louise Reichardt (his first wife, married 22 October 1804 in Altenburg). Together they had four sons, of whom Edgar was the youngest. Around 1841, his mother read journal reviews and author sketches and closely followed David Strauss's life and work, including the reception of his Dogmatik. The Bauer family belonged to the German middle class.

=== Young Hegelian radicalism ===
==== Doktorklub, Die Freien and early journalism ====
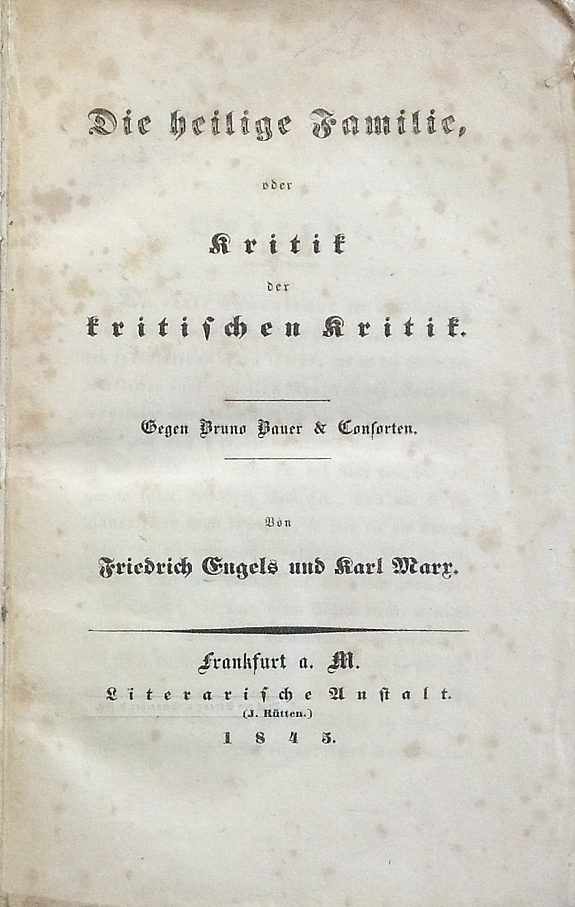
Title page of The Holy Family (1845), in which Karl Marx and Friedrich Engels polemicized against Edgar and Bruno Bauer.

Bauer studied jurisprudence and philosophy at the University of Berlin, where he joined the Young Hegelian circle around his brother Bruno Bauer. Other members of this circle included Arnold Ruge, Karl Marx, Max Stirner, Friedrich Engels, Georg Herwegh, Karl Grün, Moses Hess and Mikhail Bakunin. He was particularly close to Engels at that time. Bauer became a regular contributor to a range of philosophical and political publications, and he developed a strongly revolutionary political outlook.

After Bruno Bauer was dismissed from his academic position because of his atheism, Edgar Bauer regarded an academic career as closed to him, given his brother's reputation and his own growing profile as a radical publicist. In 1842 he abandoned his studies and became a freelance writer and journalist. He contributed to the liberal Rheinische Zeitung, among other publications.

==== Trial and imprisonment ====
In 1843 Bauer published Critique's Quarrel with Church and State, a work described as the first sustained theoretical defense of terrorist tactics for political and social ends. The book appeared on 7 August 1843, but the Berlin police confiscated what they believed to be the entire edition that same night. On 23 October 1843, Bauer was indicted for publishing without submitting the book to the royal censor. His trial ran from November 1843 to February 1844.

In September 1844 he was sentenced to three years of minimum-security confinement. Bauer had meanwhile smuggled a single copy to Switzerland, enabling the radical publisher Friedrich Jenni to issue a second edition. When copies reappeared in Berlin in mid-1844, Bauer was rearrested and retried, and in spring 1845 his sentence was extended to four years. He began serving his term at the fortress of Magdeburg on 9 May 1845.

While he was in prison, his former associates Marx and Engels published a polemical critique of him and his brother Bruno, The Holy Family (1845). They continued this critique in The German Ideology (1846), which was not published at the time.

==== Revolution of 1848 in Berlin ====
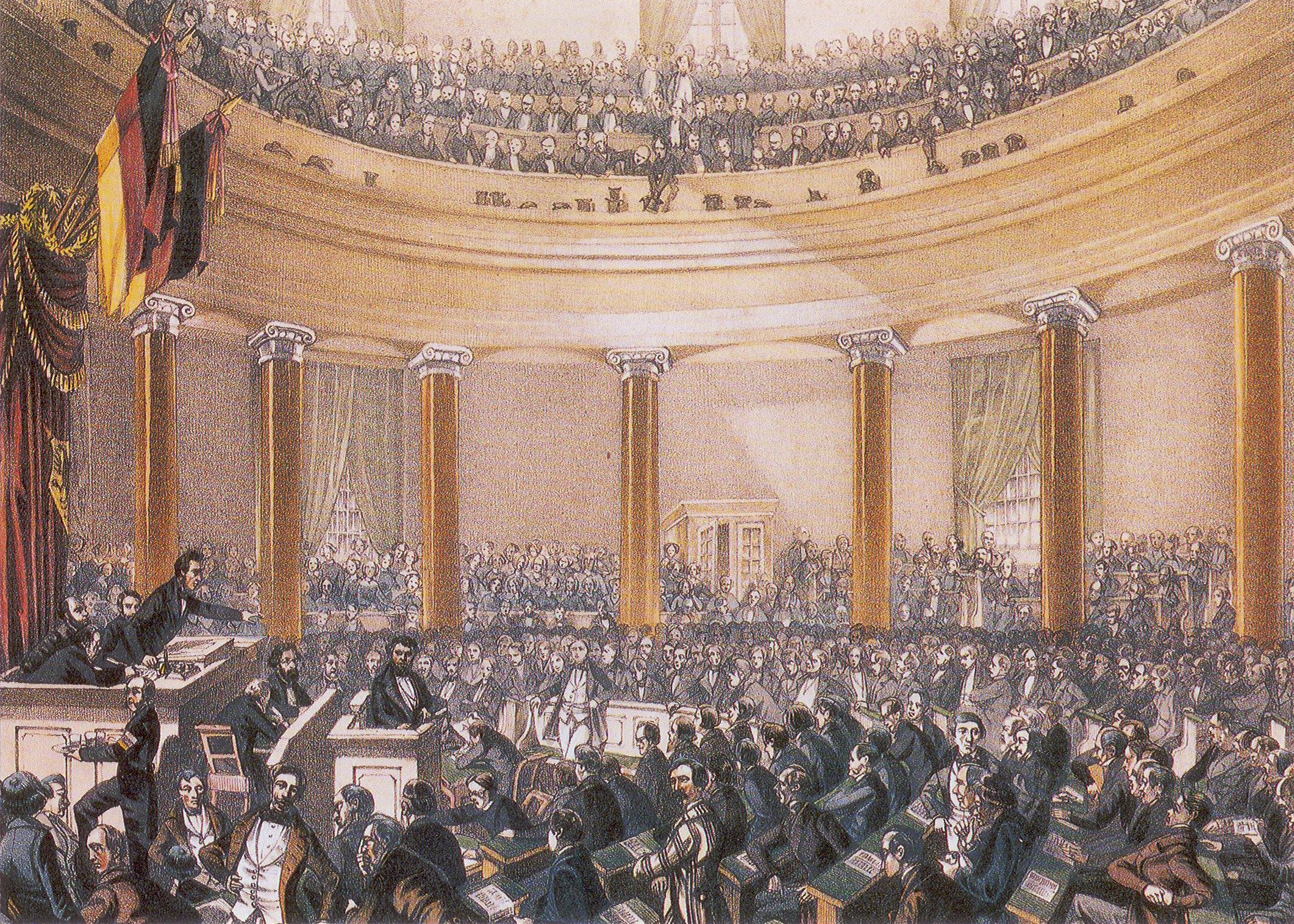
Session of the Frankfurt National Assembly in June 1848, which Bauer denounced for electing Archduke John of Austria as imperial regent.

Following Prussia's general amnesty for political prisoners of 18 March 1848, Bauer returned to Charlottenburg and Berlin in April, where he participated in the Revolution of 1848. Berlin's political situation had changed radically since his imprisonment. On 23 March, Berlin radicals had taken the initiative in founding the Political Club, in which Young Hegelians also gathered, under the chairmanship of the Cologne jurist and Young Hegelian Georg Jung. Bauer joined the club soon after his return, and on 16 April 1848 he became a member of the "Volks-Wahlcomité" (People's electoral committee), which was to choose the members of the National Assembly. The Political Club soon became the largest and most influential of the political clubs founded in Berlin in 1848, with more than 1,200 members, and on 21 May it was renamed the Democratic Club. On 27 June, Bauer was elected one of its two vice presidents.

Within the Democratic Club, Bauer quickly became one of the leaders of its more revolutionary wing. In speeches he criticized the caution of the Frankfurt National Assembly and denounced its election of Archduke John of Austria as imperial regent as a betrayal of the German people. He called for power to rest with the sovereign people rather than a hereditary monarchy, and submitted the text of a petition urging the deputies who had voted against John's election to withdraw from the Assembly and constitute a new representative body on republican principles. These initiatives provoked objections from more cautious members and brought the club close to a split. On 1 July 1848, Bauer announced that the presidium was resigning because it no longer appeared to enjoy the confidence of the club's members. After a sharp debate over political tactics, however, the meeting ended in a complete victory for the presidium, and the club asked the presidium to withdraw its resignation.

The increasingly revolutionary course of the Democratic Club formed part of the background to the disturbances in Charlottenburg and Berlin in August 1848. On 20 August, participants in a meeting called to found a democratic club in Charlottenburg were attacked by a crowd armed with clubs. According to a report cited by Gamby, some of those attacked fled to the house of Bauer's brother Egbert, where Edgar and Bruno Bauer were dragged into the street and beaten and the house was wrecked. The Berlin Democratic Club responded with a large placard, said to have been written by Edgar Bauer, calling on the public to resist the reaction, and a mass demonstration then marched on the ministers. As the unrest spread, the crowd first forced its way into the interior minister's hotel. Later, after constables tried to disperse the demonstrators, the crowd smashed the windows of the minister president's hotel. On 22 August, the authorities proposed a law against unauthorized popular assemblies and conspiracies, and arrest warrants were issued for the leaders of the demonstration, including Bauer. When police officers came to arrest him on 27 August, he was away from home. During the house search a railway worker who arrived at the apartment identified himself as Edgar Bauer and was arrested, but was quickly exposed when he was brought before the chairman of the Democratic Club.

=== Flight and exile ===
Bauer then went underground to avoid arrest. He first went to Vienna, where Gamby suggests that he was in close contact with the revolutionaries then active in the Austrian capital. There he contributed an article, "Aristokraten und Plebejer" (Aristocrats and plebeians), to Hermann Jellinek's Kritischer Sprechsaal (Critical forum). The article attacked the aristocracy and the Catholic Church from a plebeian social standpoint. Bauer remained in Vienna until October 1848. Reports then placed him back in Berlin, though before the police could arrest him he had again disappeared, reportedly for Breslau. In February 1849, Wilhelm, Prince of Prussia, wrote to General Friedrich Graf von Wrangel that Bauer had been under orders of arrest for three months, could not be found, and yet was said still to be visiting public places in Berlin. Despite military occupation, the state of siege, and the dissolution of the National Assembly, the democratic movement in the city remained active. By February 1849, however, Bauer appears to have left Berlin permanently.

After the defeat of the revolution, Bauer left Berlin for Hamburg in February 1849. He lived for a time in the suburb of St. Georg, contributed to the radical Altona newspaper Die Reform (The reform), and established contact with the publisher Hoffmann und Campe, which agreed to publish his new periodical Die Parteien. Politische Revue (The parties. Political review). The journal was planned as an irregular review, with one issue every four weeks. Bauer wrote its contents himself. It covered political developments in Berlin since 1848, the movement for German unity, and the reaction in France during and after the February Revolution. Only three issues appeared, the last two as double issues. Gamby argues that the journal shows Bauer still adhering to the programmatic indeterminacy of his earlier writings. In Die Parteien, Bauer treated democracy and socialism as distinct parties and expressed sympathies for both, but regarded neither as the final political form.

Bauer remained in Hamburg only briefly. By spring 1849 he was working for the Norddeutsche Freie Presse (North German free press) in Altona, founded by the Schleswig-Holstein politician and later German-American Forty-Eighter Theodor Olshausen. It was the largest newspaper in Holstein and a leading radical democratic paper of the Schleswig-Holstein progressive movement. He began there as a proofreader and joined the editorial staff when a position opened in summer 1849. Bauer later served as editor in chief, which Gamby places in 1850 and 1851, after the paper had begun to decline as the Schleswig-Holstein cause neared defeat in the First Schleswig War and Prussia withdrew its support.

By 1851, Bauer had been won over to the Danish side in the conflict. In that year, the Berlin and Hamburg police traced him to Ottensen near Altona, where he was living under the false name "Eduard Lange". He was arrested and identified during questioning, but escaped during a search of his lodgings and fled first to Flensburg and then to Copenhagen. During the summer of 1851, he reported on the proceedings of the Flensburg Notables' Assembly for the newly launched Altonaer Zeitung (Altona newspaper), and on 1 July he left the Norddeutsche Freie Presse for an editorial post on that paper, which was subsidized by the Danish government and advocated the Danish cause in the duchies.

=== London exile and Danish connections ===
==== Arrival in London ====
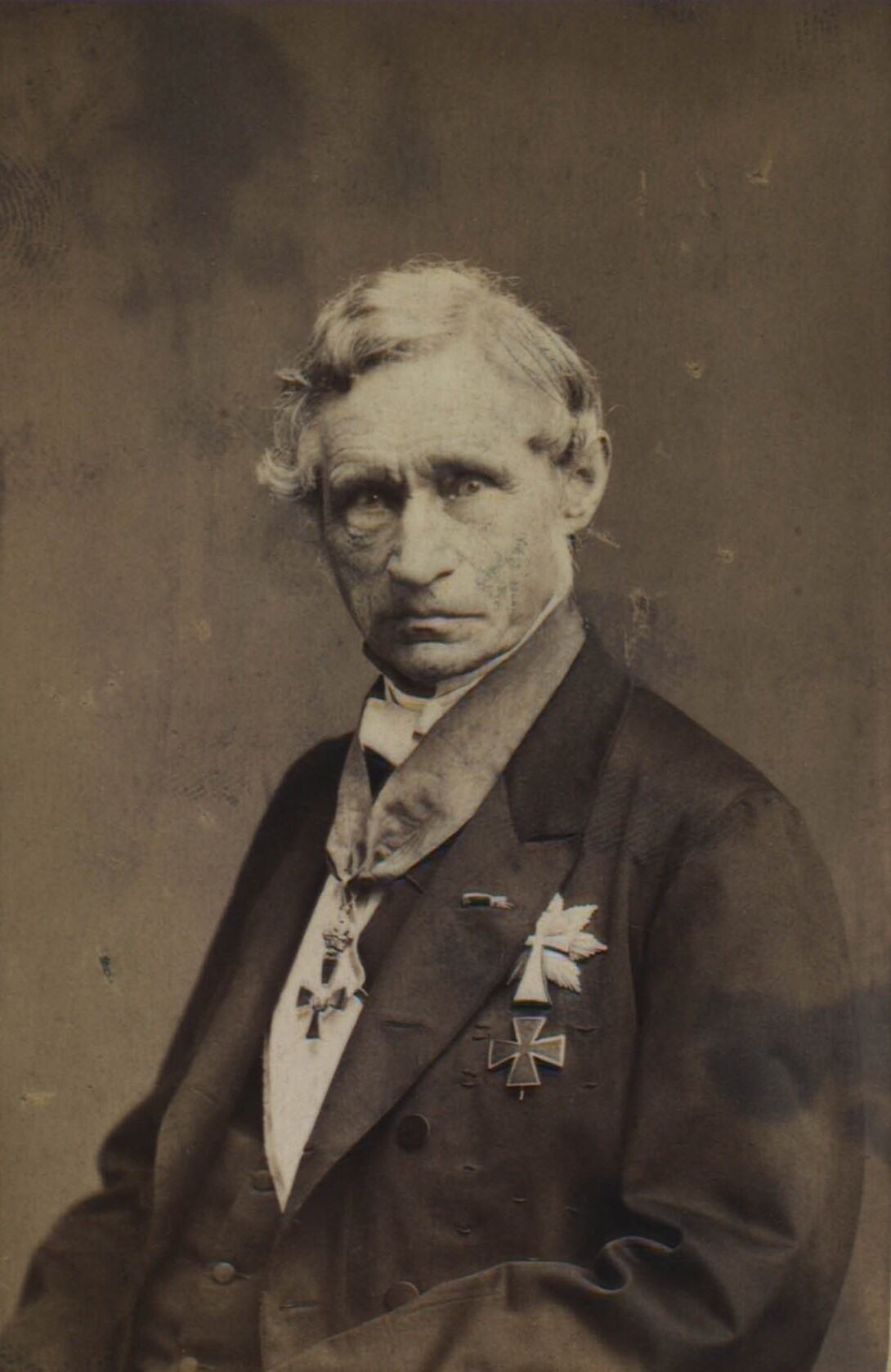
Cosmus Bræstrup, the Copenhagen police director who received Bauer's confidential reports on the émigré milieu in London.

After fleeing to Copenhagen in 1851, Bauer came into contact with the writer Peder Hjort who, according to Gamby, directed Danish foreign propaganda on behalf of the government and also oversaw the Altonaer Zeitung, as well as with Copenhagen's police director Cosmus Bræstrup. Hjort secured him a berth to England, while Prussian efforts to obtain his extradition were delayed until he had left Denmark. Bauer arrived in London on 13 October 1851, traveling via Hull under the false name "Glasermeister Lange".

Bauer remained in London for several years. Before leaving Denmark, he had been appointed London correspondent of the Altonaer Zeitung. From London, he sent the paper a daily correspondence article as well as one leading article each week. From 1856, when the paper appeared under the title Nordischer Courier und Altonaer Nachrichten (Nordic courier and Altona news), Bauer continued to contribute London reports for several years. Gamby notes that these were more extensive than the paper's reports from other capitals and usually occupied about two columns in each issue.

==== Contacts with Marx and other émigrés ====
In London, Bauer moved among the German political émigrés. Gamby suggests that by August 1852 he had attached himself to the Deutsche Revolutionspartei (German Revolutionary Party), an exile organization associated with Gottfried Kinkel and August Willich that aimed to serve as an umbrella group for German revolutionary refugees in Europe and the United States. One of its central projects was a revolutionary fund for a renewed uprising in Germany, modeled on Giuseppe Mazzini's Italian revolutionary fund and financed through subscriptions from emigrants. Bauer participated in an August 1852 London meeting on Kinkel's proposed revolutionary loan, where he spoke in the discussion.

By 1853, Bauer was in regular contact with Karl Marx in London and at times supplied him with information on current political developments. By May 1854, Marx described Edgar Bauer as a frequent visitor in his household who was there every week. Wilhelm Liebknecht later recalled a drinking expedition in London involving himself, Marx and Bauer, a story that suggests relations between Bauer and Marx had become socially close despite their earlier polemics. In December 1855 Edgar and Bruno Bauer visited Marx in London while Bruno was exploring the possibility of emigrating to England. On this basis, Gamby concludes that the hostility dating from The Holy Family had by then largely subsided, although Marx appears to have remained politically reserved toward Bauer.

In 1858, Bauer became more visibly active in the German émigré milieu in London. That year Wilhelm Liebknecht entered him as a member of the Arbeiterbildungsverein (Workers' Educational Association). He was also a member of the International Association, a successor to the Fraternal Democrats. As its secretary, he drafted its statutes but soon withdrew. He also belonged to a group called Deutsche Männer (German men), which Gamby describes as apparently not politically active. After joining the Arbeiterbildungsverein, Bauer became editor of the German-language émigré newspaper Die neue Zeit (The new age), but the paper sold poorly and ceased publication in less than a year. He later also contributed to Kinkel's weekly Hermann. By the end of 1858, his London contributions to the Nordischer Courier und Altonaer Nachrichten had declined, and in a letter to Hjort, he complained that the paper was no longer accepting his articles. At the same time, his confidential reporting to the Danish authorities remained active. Gamby notes that in 1858 alone Bauer received £116 10s. for this work, and that by 1859 his reports were being valued highly by police officials in Dresden. Marx also remained reserved toward him in these later years, hinting after Bauer joined the Arbeiterbildungsverein that he merely played the communist and referring to him repeatedly as "the clown". He does not appear to have suspected that Bauer was acting as an informant for the Danish police.

==== Press work and Danish connections ====
In autumn 1852, after a visit to London by Bræstrup, whom Bauer had met in Copenhagen the previous year, Bauer began supplying confidential reports on the political émigré milieu in England to the Danish police. Through the Danish consul general in London, Regnar Westenholz, he delivered at least four substantial reports totaling 326 pages between November 1852 and June 1853, including information on Karl Marx, Friedrich Engels and Karl Schapper. Although the reports are unsigned, Gamby attributes them to Bauer on the basis of letters he sent at the same time to Bræstrup and Peder Hjort, and suggests that payment was not at first Bauer's principal motive. Part of the material was forwarded in copy to police authorities in Dresden, Hanover and Vienna. After this initial phase, Bauer's connection with the Danish police lapsed for about three years, but Bræstrup renewed contact in early 1856.

By at least 1857, Bauer was also working on behalf of Peder Hjort in support of the Danish position on the Schleswig-Holstein question. Letters preserved in the Danish National Archives in Copenhagen show him placing articles in the German press and writing English-language pamphlets intended to win sympathy in Britain for the integrity of the Danish monarchy. Gamby names among the outlets in which Bauer published on Danish behalf the Neue Preußische Zeitung (Kreuzzeitung), the Berliner Revue and the Preußisches Volksblatt. He also contributed to Hermann Wagener's Staats- und Gesellschaftslexikon (State and society lexicon), edited by his brother Bruno Bauer, including a substantial article on Denmark that was later translated into Danish. In 1857 he published the pamphlet Reflections on the Integrity of the Danish Monarchy and, with Otto Wigand in Leipzig, the essay collection Englische Freiheit (English freedom).

By the spring of 1861, Bauer's confidential reporting for the Danish authorities had reached a considerable scale. By then he had submitted 135 reports totaling more than 2,000 pages, together with about 50 letters containing additional political information. He adds that the reports ranged beyond the German émigré milieu to other European and American revolutionary movements, and that the Danish Foreign Ministry remained sufficiently satisfied with Bauer's work for George Quaade, the Danish ambassador in Berlin from 1861, to continue employing him after Bauer's return to Germany. In the same year Bauer also published the English-language pamphlet Schleswig.

A Dresden police report from London dated 28 January 1861 also related an unproven story that Bauer struck Karl Marx in the face during a gathering after Marx allegedly replied to Bauer's suggestion that his wife should work by saying that such work might suit Bauer's wife, but not his own. Gamby notes, however, that the episode reads like gossip and that Bauer himself did not mention it. Eric v.d. Luft likewise cites the incident as part of Bauer's later London years. Gamby suggests that, despite Bauer’s growing entanglement with the Danish authorities, his London reports generally remained sympathetic to democratic politics.

=== Return to Germany and later journalism ===
==== Berlin and pro-Danish journalism ====
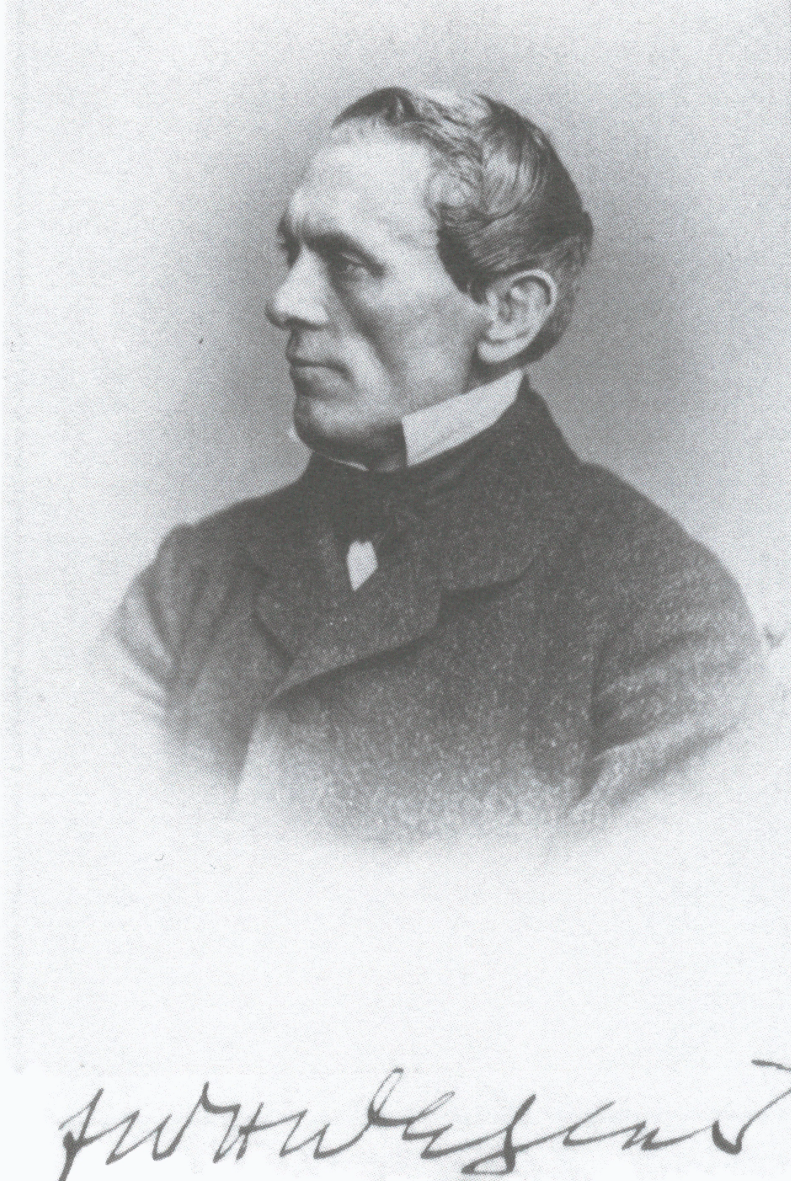
Hermann Wagener, whose political and journalistic network helped Bauer become editor of the Preußisches Volksblatt in Berlin.

The amnesty for political offenses issued in Prussia on 12 January 1861, following the accession of Wilhelm I, made Bauer's return from exile possible. As the anticipated return of political refugees reduced the Danish government's interest in maintaining an agent in London, Bauer also sought employment in Berlin. In the same period, his article "Dänemark" in Wagener's Staats- und Gesellschaftslexikon met with marked approval in Danish official circles and was published in Danish translation at government expense. In correspondence with Hjort, Bræstrup and Quaade, Bauer set out the case for moving to Berlin, presenting himself as a publicist committed to a political accommodation between Prussia and the Danish monarchy and argued that Berlin offered the most effective position from which to counter anti-Danish agitation in the German press. After receiving, through Quaade, an advance for future literary work, he left London with his family on 16 May 1861 and settled in Berlin after a brief stay with his mother-in-law.

After his arrival, Bauer renewed contact with Wagener, whose political and journalistic network became central to his position in Berlin. Through Wagener's mediation, Bauer became editor of the Preußisches Volksblatt (Prussian people's paper), a post he held for about two years before resigning shortly before the outbreak of the Second Schleswig War in 1864. During this period he continued to write in support of the Danish position, arranged for articles by Peder Hjort to appear in the paper, and remained active in the press campaign surrounding Schleswig-Holstein. In 1861, a German translation of his London pamphlet Schleswig appeared in Hamburg, although Gamby notes that Bauer himself had no involvement in that edition. In 1862, his "Holstein" article from Wagener's lexicon was published in Danish translation, and in 1863 he published Das Herzogthum Holstein und seine Rechte (The Duchy of Holstein and its rights), a memorandum for the Holstein municipal assembly which Gamby identifies as apparently identical with the work Bauer had outlined two years earlier in correspondence with Copenhagen police director Cosmus Bræstrup.

From Berlin, Bauer continued to send reports to Bræstrup. Between 1863 and 1865 he submitted a series of reports on debates in the Prussian parliament and on minister-president Otto von Bismarck's relations to the king, the parliament, and divisions within the government, although Gamby notes that these later reports contained little new factual material. After 1866, Bauer was again used by the Danish legation in Berlin as an intermediary in matters connected with the Schleswig question, including contacts involving the North German Reichstag deputies Hans Andersen Krüger and Nicolai Ahlmann. Danish observers in Berlin regarded him with some suspicion in part because he was a Prussian and because of his drinking, even while acknowledging his familiarity with Prussian political conditions and his usefulness to the legation. In December 1868, after Bismarck referred before a Reichstag committee to a supposed Danish agent with a two-syllable name and the title "doctor", Gamby suggests that Bauer may have been the person intended. Bauer moved to Altona later that year to assume the editorship of the Altonaer Mercur, apparently with the approval of the Danish legation, which no longer regarded his continued presence in Berlin as necessary.

==== Altona and Christian political journalism ====
Bauer became editor of the Altonaer Mercur in January 1869. The long-established newspaper was strongly sympathetic to Denmark, a position that had cost it much of its former readership, and by the time Bauer took over it was already nearing the end of its run. In July 1869 the paper complained of pressure against the Schleswig-Holstein press, including rumors that it would soon cease publication and accusations of pietism, the first public sign of Bauer's turn from his earlier anti-religious radicalism toward a pronounced religious outlook. His religious turn also marked a lasting break in Bauer's relationship with his brother Bruno, with whom he had been closely associated since youth.

In the first sixteen issues of the Altonaer Mercur in 1869, Bauer also serialized the entertainment novel Bekenntnisse eines Hoffräuleins. Nach Mirabella's Papieren (Confessions of a court lady. From Mirabella's papers) under the pseudonym Martin von Geismar. Gamby interprets the novel as an attempt to broaden the newspaper's appeal, and notes that "Mirabella" had been the nickname of Bauer's wife Albertine from their time in Berlin. He resigned from the newspaper in mid-October 1869, soon after which it ceased publication.

By the end of 1869 Bauer was involved in a new publishing project with Wilhelm Heinrich Koopmann, the Lutheran bishop in Kiel. They published the weekly Kirchliche Blätter (Church gazette) from 1870 to 1872, with Bauer as editor and publisher and Koopmann initially responsible for its content. At the time, Koopmann was working to maintain unity among the clergy in Schleswig-Holstein in opposition to the introduction of the Prussian church constitution, which threatened the church autonomy of the conquered duchies. After Koopmann's death in May 1871, Bauer continued publishing the paper alone until May 1872.

The Kirchliche Blätter brought Bauer into close contact with ecclesiastical circles in Schleswig-Holstein. In 1870, he briefly took over the publication and distribution of Sonntagsblatt für's Haus (Sunday paper for the home). In October that same year, Bauer founded the Christian quarterly Altonaer Staatszeitung (Altona state newspaper), which had a more openly political orientation and ran until March 1872. Occasionally, Bauer also issued longer essays from his journals as separate pamphlets, including Die Wahrheit über die Internationale (The truth about the international) in 1872. In that pamphlet, he advanced the mistaken claim that the International Workingmen's Association had originated in the International Association, of which he had briefly been secretary during his London exile.

In March 1872, the Altona police informed Bauer that he had not posted the required security deposits for either the Kirchliche Blätter or the Altonaer Staatszeitung. His finances had probably already worsened after his resignation from the Altonaer Mercur, and the monthly payment he had received for his work for the Danish legation in Berlin was discontinued. Unable to meet the new demand, including 2,500 marks for the Kirchliche Blätter alone, Bauer was forced to cease publication of both periodicals.

==== Hanover and Welf journalism ====
Bauer eventually settled in Hanover in 1873.

=== Final years and death ===
Bauer suffered a stroke in 1884 that temporarily left him paralyzed. The paralysis gradually receded, but he never fully recovered and later became fully incapacitated. At the time, Bauer's son William had emigrated to the United States, worked on the Mississippi railroad, and was seriously ill in Colorado Springs.

Bauer died in Hanover on 18 August 1886 after a heart attack. His widow sought assistance from George Quaade in selling his library, but Bauer's papers, including letters and diaries, have not been recovered.

== Young Hegelian thought and reception ==
Edgar Bauer did not follow the "materialist turn" in Young Hegelian philosophy associated with Ludwig Feuerbach (as Marx, Engels, Grün and others did), but continued to work within the idealist and activist current associated with his brother Bruno Bauer. Like Bruno, Bauer was an anti-theist and treated emancipation from religion as a necessary precondition of social emancipation. Unlike Bruno, who was skeptical of socialism, Bauer described himself as a socialist and was usually associated with the "True Socialists" around Hess and Grün.

According to Lawrence Stepelevich, Bauer was the most anarchistic of the Young Hegelians, and "...it is possible to discern, in the early writings of Edgar Bauer, the theoretical justification of political terrorism." German anarchists such as Max Nettlau and Gustav Landauer highlighted Bauer's 1843 book Critique's Quarrel with Church and State as an early anarchist text in Germany.

== Works ==
- Geschichte Europas seit der ersten französischen Revolution (von Archibald Alison). In: Deutsche Jahrbücher für Wissenschaft und Kunst, 14./15./16. Dezember 1842
- Der Streit der Kritik mit Kirche und Staat (Charlottenburg, 1843)
- Denkwürdigkeiten zur Geschichte der neuern Zeit (1843–1844, 12 Hefte, with Bruno Bauer)
- Die Geschichte der konstitutionellen Bewegungen im südlichen Deutschland während der Jahre 1831–34 (Charlottenburg, 1845, 3 Bd.)
- Die Kunst der Geschichtsschreibung und Herrn Dahlmanns Geschichte der französischen Revolution (Magdeburg, 1846)
- Geschichte des Luthertums (under the pen name Martin von Geismar, Leipzig, 1846–1847)
- Über die Ehe im Sinn des Luthertums (Leipzig, 1847)
- Der Mensch und die Ehe vor dem Richterstuhle der Sittlichkeit. In: Die Epigonen. Fünfter Band (1848), pp. 317–343
- Das Teutsche Reich in seiner geschichtlichen Gestalt (Altona, 1872)
- Die Wahrheit über die Internationale (Altona, 1873)
- Englische Freiheit (Leipzig, 1857)
- Die Rechte des Herzogtums Holstein (Berlin, 1863)
- Die Deutschen und ihre Nachbarn (Hamburg, 1870)
- Artikel V, der deutsche Gedanke und die dänische Monarchie (Altona, 1873)
- Der Freimaurerbund und das Licht (Hannover, 1877)
- Der Magus des Nordens. Novelle. 1882
