= Young Hegelians =

German intellectual group of the 1830s–1840s

The Young Hegelians (German: Junghegelianer), or Left Hegelians (Linkshegelianer), were a group of German intellectuals who were active from the late 1830s to the mid-1840s. Their thought represented a radicalization of Georg Wilhelm Friedrich Hegel's philosophy, moving from the analysis of religion to critiques of politics and society that laid the groundwork for socialism and Marxism. A central feature of their work was a critique of what they saw as the intertwined religious, philosophical, and political dogmas of "personalism".

Centered at the University of Berlin, the group initially focused on theological questions, galvanized by David Strauss's controversial book The Life of Jesus (1835), which treated the Gospels as mythological expressions of the early Christian community's consciousness rather than as historical fact. This led to a split in the Hegelian school between the conservative "Right Hegelians" who defended the compatibility of Hegel's philosophy with orthodox Christianity and the radical "Young Hegelians" who drew increasingly atheistic and anti-religious conclusions.

The movement's leading figures included Bruno Bauer, Ludwig Feuerbach, Moses Hess, and Max Stirner. Bauer developed a philosophy of "self-consciousness" and "criticism" that rejected all religious and external authority. Feuerbach's influential work The Essence of Christianity (1841) argued that God was merely a projection of humanity's own alienated "species-essence", a concept that profoundly influenced his contemporaries, including the young Karl Marx. Under the editorship of Arnold Ruge, journals such as the Hallische Jahrbücher became the movement's main organs, evolving from literary and theological concerns to direct political opposition against the Prussian state.

The Young Hegelians' radicalism intensified after 1840, but government repression, particularly the dismissal of Bauer from his academic post in 1842 and widespread press censorship, led to the movement's rapid fragmentation. In its final phase, Stirner's The Ego and Its Own (1844) pushed the critique to its nihilistic conclusion by rejecting not only God and the state but also Feuerbach's concept of "Man" in favor of the unique, sovereign ego. Simultaneously, figures like Hess and Marx began applying the Hegelian-Feuerbachian concept of alienation to economics, transforming the movement's philosophical radicalism into the foundations of communism. By the end of 1844, the Young Hegelian movement had dissolved as a coherent force, its intellectual trajectory logically exhausted by 1846 with the work of Karl Schmidt. Nevertheless, it decisively shaped the development of Marxism and other radical philosophies.

== Origins ==
=== Hegel's legacy and the school's division ===
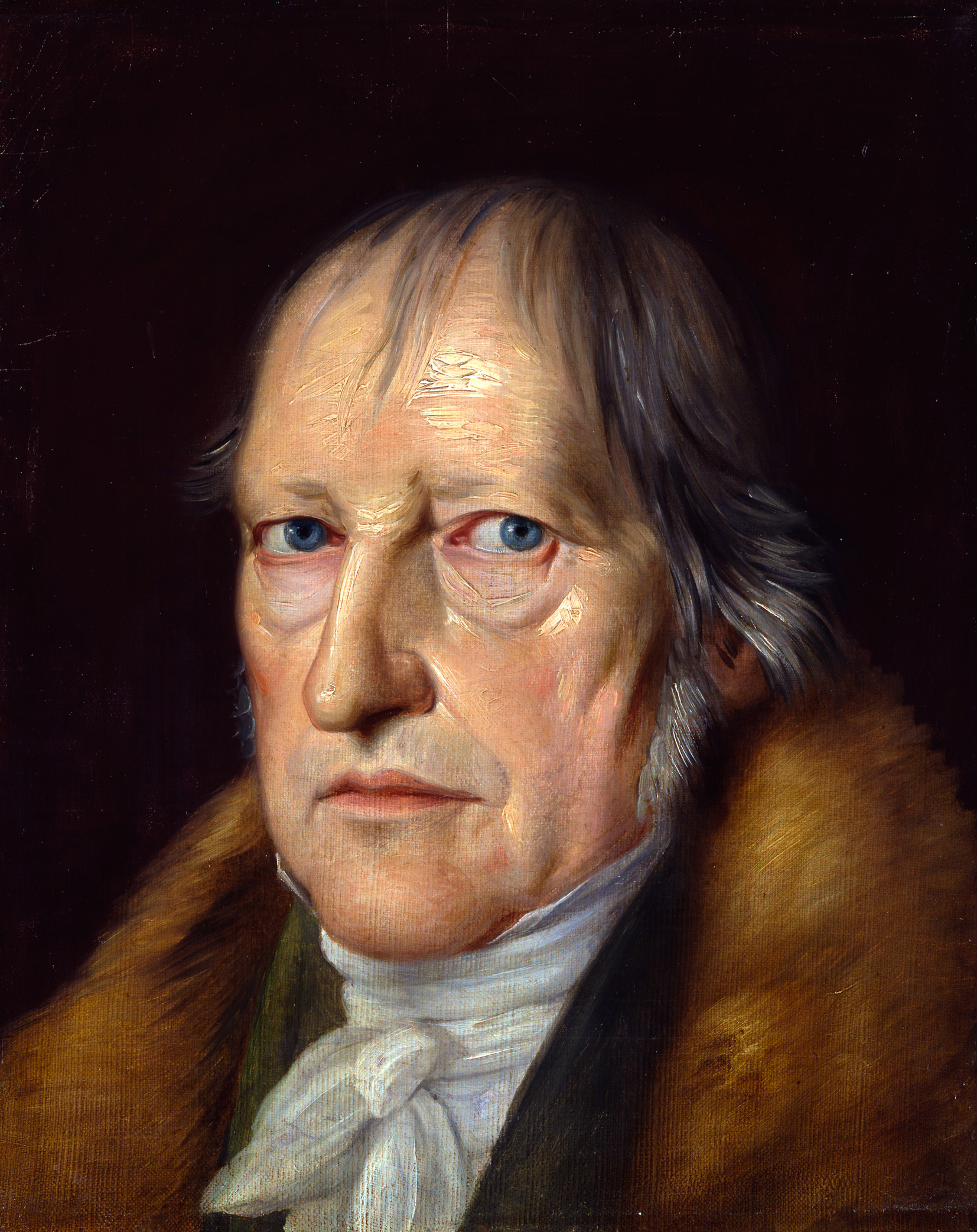
Georg Wilhelm Friedrich Hegel

Following Georg Wilhelm Friedrich Hegel's death in 1831, his disciples initially worked to preserve and elaborate his philosophical system, which had become dominant in Germany. Based in Berlin, Hegel's closest followers founded the Hegelian periodical Jahrbücher für wissenschaftliche Kritik and began preparing a complete edition of his works. The prevailing view was that Hegel's philosophy was the final and ultimate system, leaving his pupils to work out its implications in various fields. This initial phase was marked by debates over the metaphysical worth of the Hegelian system, with conservative figures like Carl Friedrich Göschel defending its orthodox implications.

However, ambiguities within Hegel's own writings, particularly concerning religion, soon led to internal divisions. While Hegel had described Christianity as the "absolute" and "perfect" religion, his framework, in which philosophy and religion shared the same content but differed in form (philosophy using concepts, religion using images), left room for conflicting interpretations. Some of his statements suggested that God's knowledge of himself was simply humanity's self-consciousness, a theme the Young Hegelians would later develop. The most debated questions were the immortality of the soul and the personality of God. This "controversy over personality" became the central point of intersection for the theological, political, and social debates that would define the Young Hegelian movement.

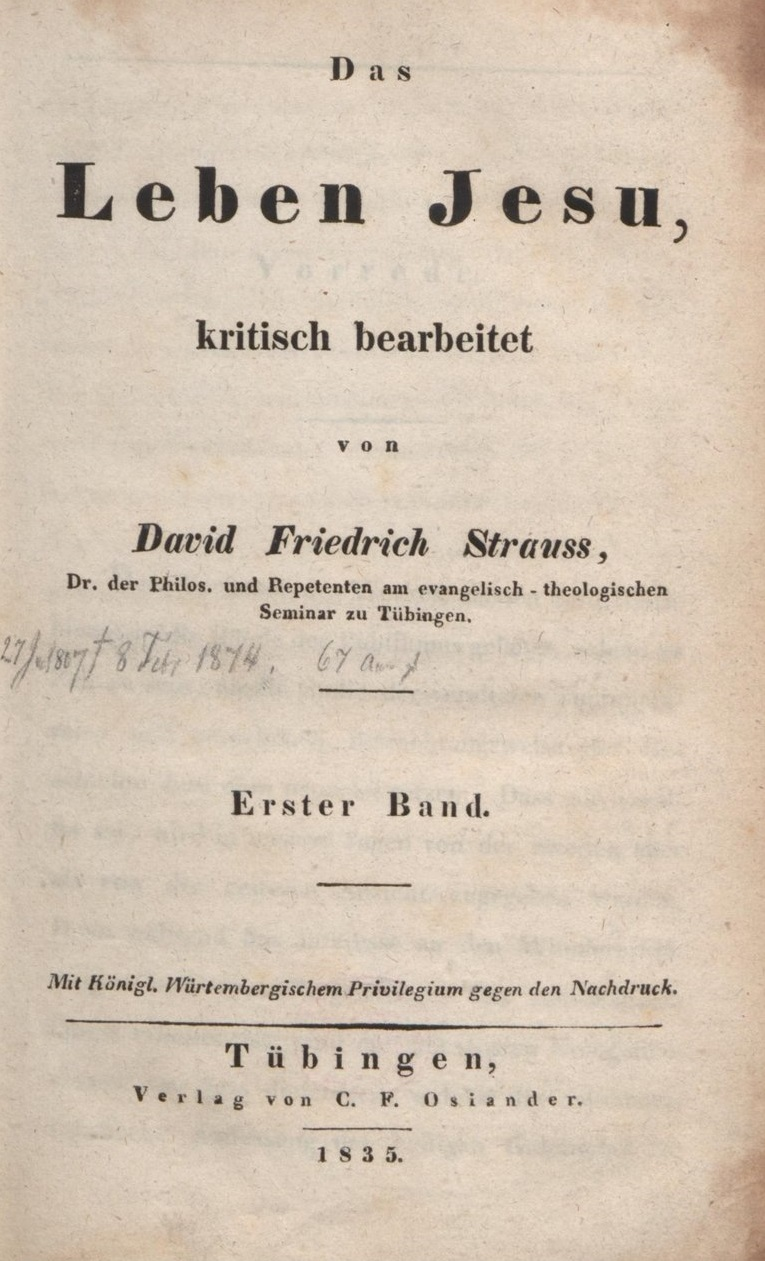
Title page of David Strauss's The Life of Jesus (1835)

The split was catalyzed by the publication of David Strauss's Das Leben Jesu (The Life of Jesus) in 1835. Strauss, a student of the Tübingen school, argued that the Gospel narratives were not historical accounts but "myths" produced by the collective consciousness of the early Christian community to express its profound desires. This implied that the incarnation of the divine was not limited to a single individual but was realized in humanity as a whole. The book caused an immediate and profound controversy, drawing attacks from orthodox Lutherans and from those Hegelians who wished to maintain the master's reconciliation of philosophy and Christianity. Strauss's critique of the personal Christ intensified the ongoing polemics about the "personality of God" and brought the political dimension of these theological debates to the forefront.

It was Strauss himself who, borrowing from the seating arrangement of the French parliament, first categorized the divisions within the Hegelian school. He labeled those who believed the Gospel narratives were fully compatible with Hegel's philosophy as the Right Hegelians (or the "Old Hegelians"). Those who, like himself, believed only parts were compatible formed the Centre. Those who concluded that Hegel's philosophy and Christian dogma were fundamentally irreconcilable became the Left Hegelians or Young Hegelians. Initially, these divisions were almost exclusively theological. The Young Hegelians' first collective project was a radical critique of established religion.

=== Socio-political context ===
Map of the German Confederation

The intellectual development of the Young Hegelians occurred within the restrictive political climate of pre-1848 Germany. The territory was divided, and in the dominant state of Prussia, strict press censorship severely limited political discourse. Berlin, the center of Hegelianism, was considered by figures like Bruno Bauer to be an unpolitical city dominated by court officials and small merchants. In this environment, religion, art, and literature were the only fields where relatively free debate was possible. Consequently, the movement's early development was overwhelmingly theological, as religious criticism became the primary vehicle for expressing dissent.

This theological focus was, however, inherently political. The Young Hegelians operated in a context shaped by the "political theology of Restoration," in which conservative thinkers sought to bolster the authority of the monarchy after the Napoleonic Wars. These thinkers, such as Friedrich Julius Stahl, developed a political theory based on a homology between divine and earthly sovereignty. Just as God was a personal, transcendent being ruling over creation, the monarch was a personal, sovereign ruler standing above the state and society. For the Young Hegelians, a critique of the theological concept of the personal God was therefore also a direct political challenge to the monarchical principle of personal sovereignty.

The Young Hegelians' radicalization was also a response to the "uneasy and incomplete shift from 'traditional' to 'modern' social forms in Prussia." Hegel's philosophy had attempted to create a theoretical balance between tradition and modernity, but this synthesis failed to match the political and social reality of Prussia. On one hand, the state's traditionalist aristocracy resisted modernization; on the other, the state's encouragement of liberalized economic reforms and an expanding population created a new class of dispossessed poor that threatened social order. Hegelian philosophy, which had no theoretical remedy for this "surging forth of sensuous" poverty, was increasingly seen as inadequate to explain the changing reality.

Different regions of Germany had distinct liberal traditions. The liberalism of East Prussia was influenced by Immanuel Kant's philosophy and looked to English models of government. In Southwest Germany, the movement was more inspired by the French Revolution and benefited from the existence of constitutions and provincial assemblies. The Rhineland, having experienced nearly twenty years of French occupation, retained a knowledge of republican institutions and was the most industrially advanced region. The Young Hegelians would eventually draw heavily on the tradition of the French Enlightenment and Revolution in their turn to political radicalism.

== Philosophy and development ==
=== General characteristics ===
The Young Hegelians were an intellectual and academic group, composed almost entirely of university-educated men from well-to-do, middle-class families. Key figures such as Bruno Bauer, Edgar Bauer, Ludwig Feuerbach, and Arnold Ruge had all begun their studies in theology before turning to philosophy, following Hegel's own path. Hegel's philosophy had promised them a "twofold harmony": existential coherence and political community. By identifying their own personal development with the cosmic evolution of Hegel's "Spirit", they could confer rational order and spiritual meaning onto their own lives. At the same time, they believed that the evolving Prussian state represented the objective realization of this philosophical reason, a "substance" in which they, as rational "subjects", could find their place in academic careers. However, their unorthodox ideas quickly closed the universities to them, leaving them as jobless intellectuals on the margins of society. This social position contributed to their radicalism and their apocalyptic belief that they were living at the dawn of a new era.

Their philosophy has been described as a "speculative rationalism", combining romantic and idealist elements with the sharp critical tendencies of the Enlightenment. They saw themselves as heralds of a continually unfolding process of reason, and their task was to use criticism to break down existing dogmas and institutions. They placed immense faith in the power of ideas and theory to precede and direct action, a belief articulated by Ludwig Buhl: "Theory blazes the trail and prepares the arrival of the new Messiah. Christianity was a theory, the Reformation was a theory, the Revolution a theory: they have become actions."

=== From theory to praxis ===
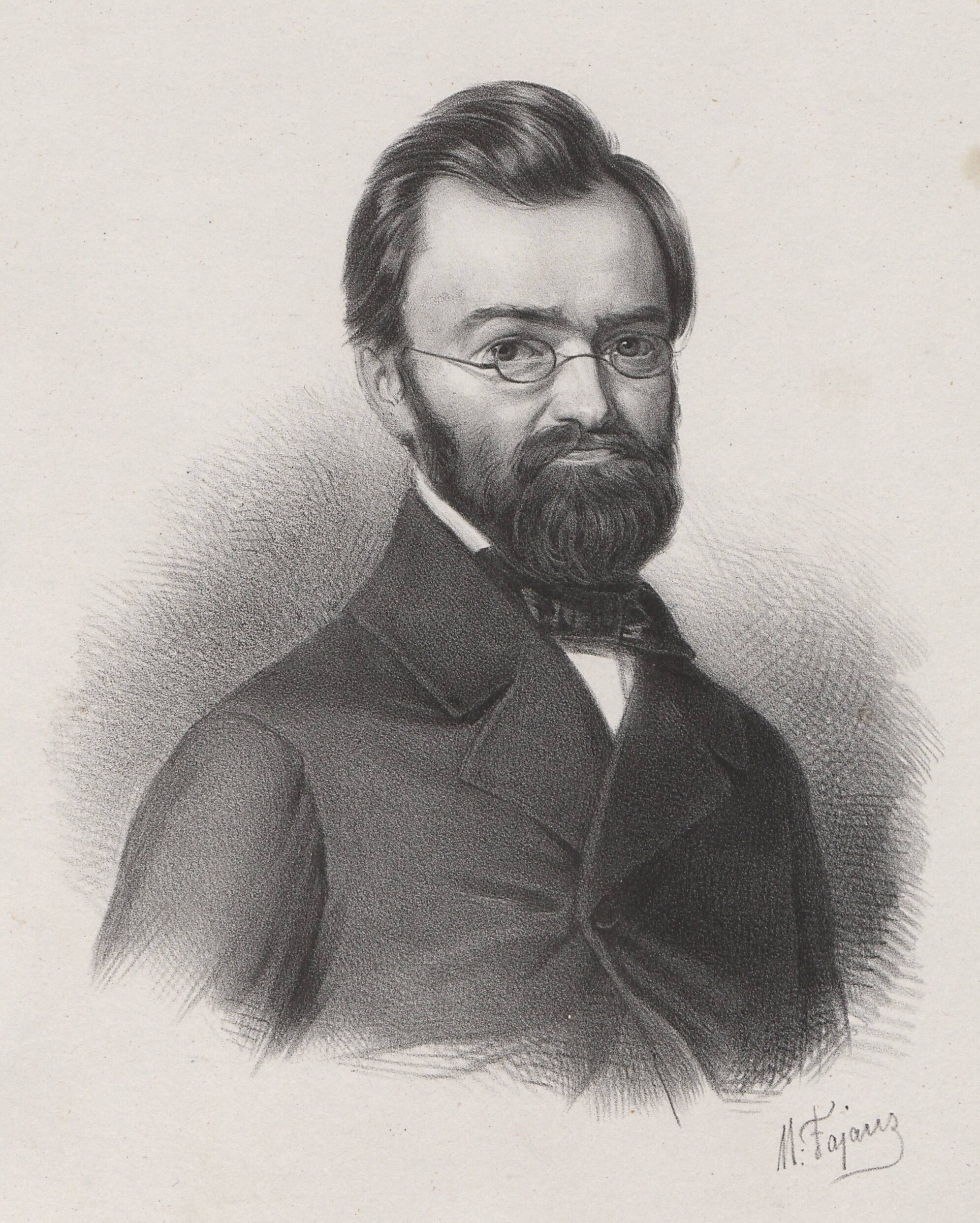
August von Cieszkowski

The transition from pure philosophy to a demand for action was first formulated by the Polish philosopher August von Cieszkowski in his 1838 book Prolegomena zur Historiosophie. Cieszkowski argued that Hegelian philosophy, which could only contemplate and explain the past post factum, was no longer sufficient. He re-oriented Hegelianism from a merely retrospective doctrine into a program for fundamental social change. He divided world history into three epochs: antiquity (the age of feeling), the Christian era (the age of thought), and the future (the age of action). He called for a "philosophy of practical activity" that would not merely interpret history but consciously shape the future, transforming Hegel's "Owl of Minerva", which takes flight at dusk, into an "Eagle of Apollo" flying into the dawn of a new age.

For this synthesis of thought and action, Cieszkowski coined the term praxis, which would become highly influential. He argued that the main agent of transformation would be the human will, not abstract thought, a position closer to Johann Gottlieb Fichte than to Hegel. Cieszkowski's call to move beyond Hegel's retrospective philosophy was part of a broader Young Hegelian effort to translate Hegel's reconciliation of thought and being into reality. His work gave the first impetus to the secularization process that would soon dominate the Young Hegelian movement.

=== Critique of religion ===
The Young Hegelians' views on religion evolved from a liberal interpretation of Protestantism to a comprehensive critique of Christianity as a form of human self-alienation. The movement can be said to have begun with Ludwig Feuerbach's anonymous 1830 work, Thoughts on Death and Immortality, in which he denied personal immortality and divine transcendence, establishing himself as the first Young Hegelian. Initially, figures like Arnold Ruge saw Protestantism as a progressive force compatible with a liberal Prussian state. However, as the political situation worsened, they came to view both Catholicism and orthodox Protestantism as incompatible with freedom.

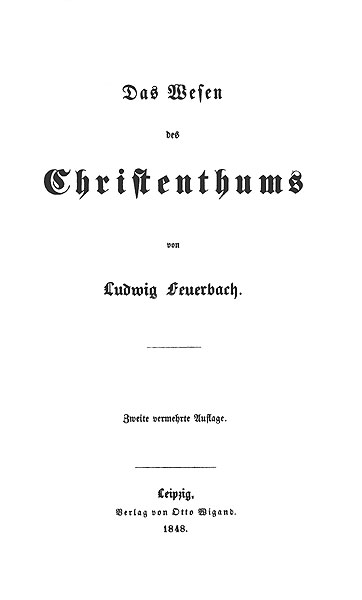
Title page of the 1848 edition of Ludwig Feuerbach's The Essence of Christianity (1841)

The core of their religious critique was the concept of alienation, developed most systematically by Feuerbach and Bruno Bauer. In The Essence of Christianity (1841), Feuerbach argued that God is nothing more than a projection of the human "species-essence". Humanity unconsciously externalizes its own highest qualities—reason, love, goodness—and worships them as a separate, divine being. In doing so, "the richer is God, the poorer is man." The critique was aimed not only at the existence of God but at the personalist form this projection took. The Christian conception of a personal God, Feuerbach argued, was the source of an asocial egoism that alienated individuals from their collective species-life. Feuerbach's aim was not to abolish religion but to reclaim these alienated human attributes, transforming theology into anthropology and creating a "new religion" of humanity.

Bruno Bauer's critique was more radical and historical. In his critiques of the Gospels, he argued that the Christian narrative was not a collective myth but a literary creation of individual evangelists, reflecting a stage of "self-consciousness" where the human ego had become alienated from itself. For Bauer, Christianity represented the most extreme form of self-alienation because it demanded total submission to an external, arbitrary God, thereby becoming the greatest obstacle to the progress of free self-consciousness. By 1842, most Young Hegelians, particularly the Berlin Freien, had adopted an openly atheistic stance, connecting philosophy with the explicit denial of God.

=== Politics and the state ===
The group's political thought mirrored its religious evolution, moving from moderate reformism to radical democracy and republicanism. Initially, they subscribed to Hegel's idealization of the state as the incarnation of objective morality and believed the Prussian state could be perfected through reform. They looked to the throne of Frederick William IV, who acceded in 1840, with hope for liberal reforms.

However, the new king's Christian-Romantic conservatism and the government's increasingly reactionary policies quickly disillusioned them. Their political critique became more direct, viewing the "Christian state" as a corrupt institution that had subordinated itself to the divisive influence of the Church. Their attack was specifically aimed at the doctrine of personal sovereignty advocated by Restoration thinkers. In place of the transcendent personal monarch, they championed the immanent sovereignty of the people. They argued, in line with Bauer, that the state's true essence was rational and universal, and that it was the task of philosophy to liberate it from religious dogma. In articles for the Rheinische Zeitung, Karl Marx defended the "rational state" as a "great organism in which legal, moral and political freedom is to find its realisation".

By 1842, the Young Hegelians had embraced "philosophical radicalism", a theoretical movement inspired by Jean-Jacques Rousseau and the French Revolution, which distinguished them from the more practical, Kantian-inspired German liberals. They began to advocate for constitutional democracy, and their critique of the liberal ideal of a juste milieu (middle way) intensified, with figures like Edgar Bauer arguing for a politics of irreconcilable extremes. Their critique also extended to civil society, which they associated with the egoism of Christian personalism. Influenced by French socialist thought, particularly Saint-Simonianism, figures like Moses Hess and Heinrich Heine developed a "social pantheism" that connected the rehabilitation of the material world with the creation of a harmonious social community, counteracting the individualism of modern commercial life.

=== Relationship with Hegel's dialectic ===
While the Young Hegelians claimed to be employing Hegel's dialectical method, they fundamentally altered its spirit. Hegel's dialectic was a process of mediation and synthesis (Aufhebung), in which a later stage of development preserves and completes earlier, one-sided stages. The Young Hegelians transformed this into a dialectic of pure opposition and "absolute negation". Influenced by the confrontational style of the French Enlightenment, they saw history as a struggle between contradictory principles, one of which must utterly triumph. This view reached its classic expression in an 1842 article by Mikhail Bakunin, who concluded with the famous line: "The passion for destruction is a creative passion, too."

Instead of seeing themselves as having broken with Hegel, the Young Hegelians preferred to accuse their master of compromise or of concealing his true, revolutionary principles. They developed the theory of an "esoteric" (secret) versus an "exoteric" (public) Hegel. Bruno Bauer's anonymous 1841 pamphlet, The Trumpet of the Last Judgement over Hegel the Atheist and Antichrist, was the key text for this interpretation. Posing as a devout pietist, Bauer argued that Hegel's philosophy, when stripped of its cautious formulations, was fundamentally atheistic and revolutionary. This allowed the Young Hegelians to position their own radicalism not as a rejection of Hegel but as the true fulfillment of his system.

== Key figures ==
=== Bruno Bauer ===
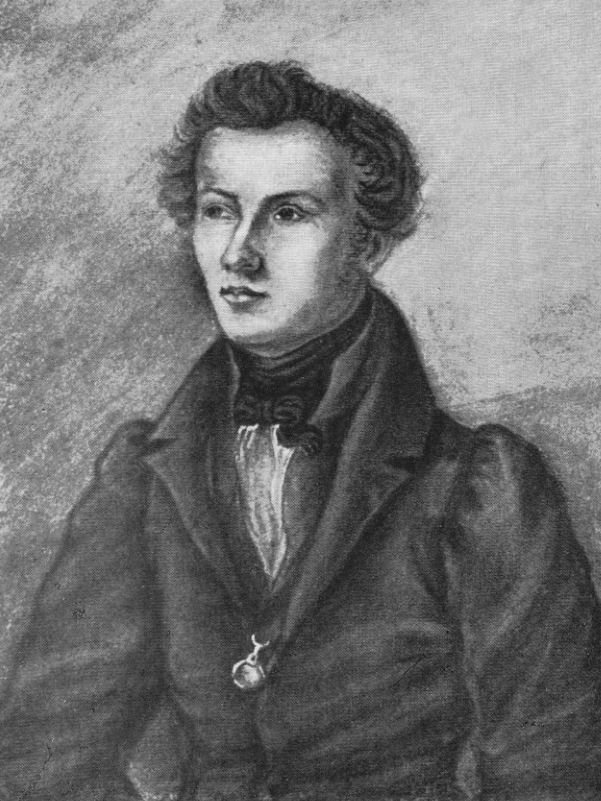
Bruno Bauer

Bruno Bauer (1809–1882) was the leading spokesman of the Young Hegelian movement during its most radical phase (1840–1842). His direct, personal influence as the leader of the Berlin circle, Die Freien, was particularly powerful, in contrast to figures like Strauss or Feuerbach who influenced primarily through their writing. Originally chosen to write the orthodox Hegelian refutation of Strauss's Life of Jesus, Bauer's own biblical studies led him to an even more extreme position. In his Critique of the Synoptic Gospels (1841–42), he argued that the Gospels were purely literary inventions of single authors and denied the historicity of Jesus. His central philosophical concept was "infinite self-consciousness", a development of Hegel's idea of spirit, which he saw as the sole creative force in the universe. History was the process of this self-consciousness progressively overcoming its self-alienation, a process driven by "criticism". For Bauer, criticism was a revolutionary force, a "terrorism of pure theory" capable of demolishing the old world of religion and dogma. His dismissal from his teaching post at the University of Bonn in 1842 was a decisive event that radicalized the entire movement. In response to the political and social crises of the 1840s, Bauer retreated into a theory of "pure criticism", an aristocratic intellectual stance that scorned both the state and the "brutalized masses".

=== Ludwig Feuerbach ===
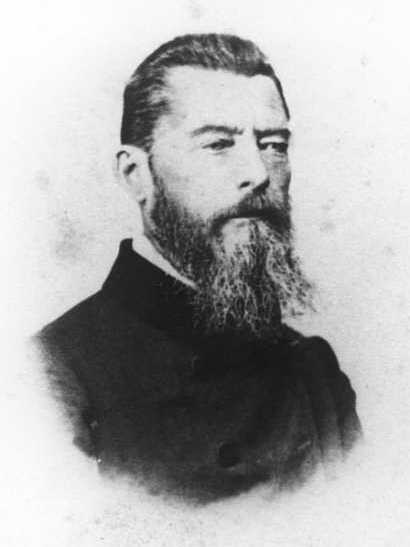
Ludwig Feuerbach

Ludwig Feuerbach (1804–1872) was the most influential Young Hegelian philosopher in the period immediately preceding the rise of Marxism. His 1841 work, The Essence of Christianity, had a profound impact on his contemporaries; the young Karl Marx considered him the only one "who has a serious and critical relationship to the Hegelian dialectic" and "has truly overcome the old philosophy". In it, he used a "transformative method" to argue that theology was a form of inverted anthropology. The qualities attributed to God—omniscience, omnipotence, love—are in fact the alienated qualities of the human "species-essence" (Gattungswesen). In subsequent essays, such as "Preliminary Theses on the Reform of Philosophy" (1842), he extended this critique to Hegel's philosophy, which he called "the last rational support of theology". Feuerbach's early critique of Christian personalism in works like Thoughts on Death and Immortality (1830) was an explicitly political attack on what he saw as the egoistical, asocial values of modern "Christian-bourgeois society." He advocated for a new philosophy founded on a sensuous, materialist humanism, where the proper object of study was "the real, ... the finite, the limited", and the relationship between human beings ("man with man") was the primary principle.

=== Moses Hess ===
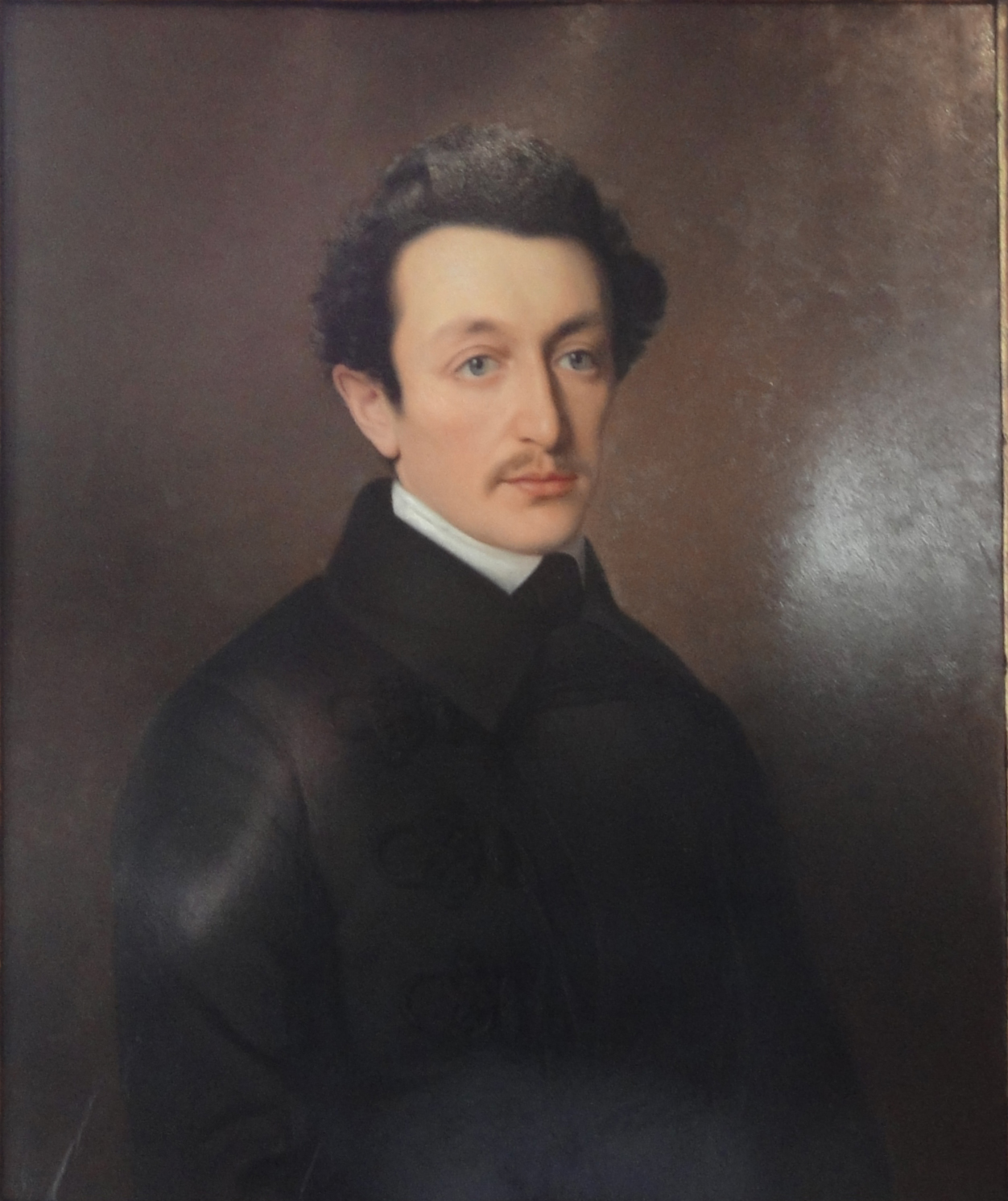
Moses Hess

Moses Hess (1812–1875) was a pivotal figure who bridged the gap between Young Hegelianism and socialism, being the first to introduce communist ideas into the group's discussions. An autodidact who never shared in the strictures of German academic life, Hess's first book, The Holy History of Mankind (1837), was the first socialist treatise written in German. In subsequent works like The European Triarchy (1841), he synthesized German philosophy with French socialist ideas, particularly Saint-Simonianism, and called for a synthesis of German philosophy, French political action, and English economic reform. He was the first to apply Feuerbach's theory of alienation to the economic sphere. In an argument that directly linked the theological critique of personalism to a critique of property, Hess claimed that the belief in personal immortality provided the spiritual justification for the right of inheritance, which he saw as the core of modern social inequality. In his 1843 essay "On the Essence of Money" (published in 1845), he argued that money was the practical equivalent of God in the theoretical world—the alienated power of humanity that had come to dominate its creators. This idea directly influenced the economic theories of the young Marx, who acknowledged his debt to Hess. Hess was instrumental in converting the young Friedrich Engels to communism and was a central figure in the "true socialist" movement, which sought to ground socialism in Feuerbach's ethical humanism.

=== Max Stirner ===
Max Stirner

Max Stirner (the pseudonym of Johann Kaspar Schmidt, 1806–1856) represented the nihilistic culmination of the Young Hegelian movement. In his only major work, The Ego and Its Own (Der Einzige und sein Eigentum, 1844), he pushed the critique of alienation to its absolute limit. Stirner argued that not only God and the state were oppressive abstractions ("spooks"), but so too were the concepts promoted by his fellow Young Hegelians, such as Feuerbach's "Man", Bauer's "Criticism", and the communists' "Society". All of these were external ideals that demanded the sacrifice of the individual. Stirner's radical alternative was the "unique" (Einzige), the concrete, egoistic self, which is its own sole law and creator of its own values. His book was a direct challenge to the humanism of Feuerbach and the nascent socialism of Marx, forcing them to confront the implications of their own critiques.

== Journals and public activity ==
=== The Hallische Jahrbücher ===
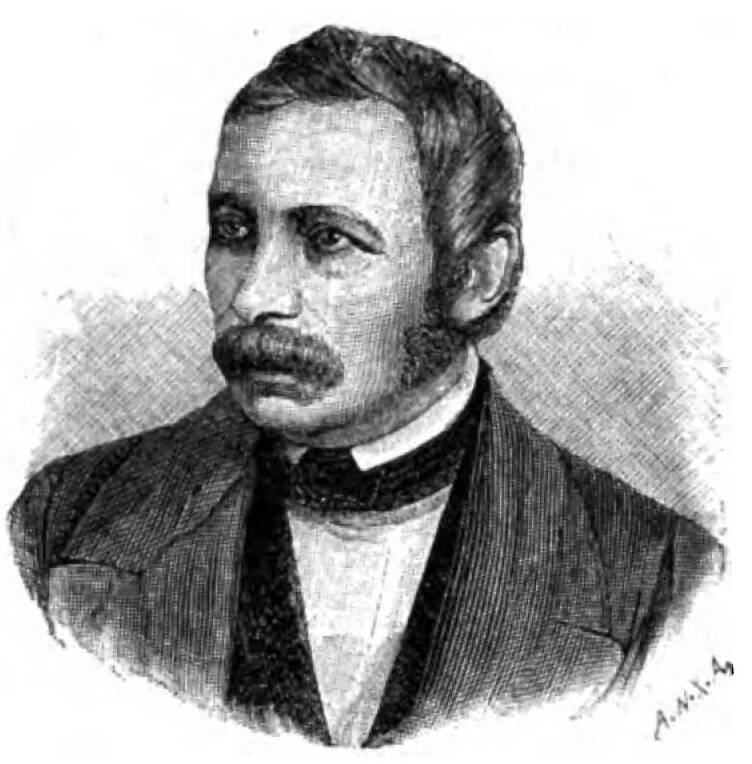
Arnold Ruge

The primary organ of the Young Hegelian movement was the Hallische Jahrbücher für deutsche Wissenschaft und Kunst (Halle Annals for German Science and Art), founded in 1838 by Arnold Ruge and Theodor Echtermeyer. Ruge served as the movement's "devoted publicity manager," and his journal became "the only bridge between philosophical theory and political and social activism." Initially intended as a broad-based journal of literary and philosophical criticism, its defense of Strauss and its increasingly anti-clerical stance soon gave it a radical reputation. A key turning point was the "Cologne Troubles" of 1837, a dispute between the Prussian state and the Catholic Archbishop. Ruge's aggressive reviews of pamphlets related to the affair, in which he championed the principles of the Reformation and the Enlightenment, alienated conservative contributors and firmly aligned the journal with the emerging political opposition.

After 1840, the journal became more overtly political. In 1841, facing censorship in Prussia, Ruge moved the publication to Dresden and renamed it the Deutsche Jahrbücher (German Annals). It became increasingly influenced by Feuerbach's humanism, advocated for democracy, and published articles by prominent Young Hegelians, including Feuerbach, Bruno Bauer, and Moses Hess. The journal was finally suppressed by the Saxon authorities in January 1843 at the instigation of the Prussian government.

=== The Freien and the Rheinische Zeitung ===
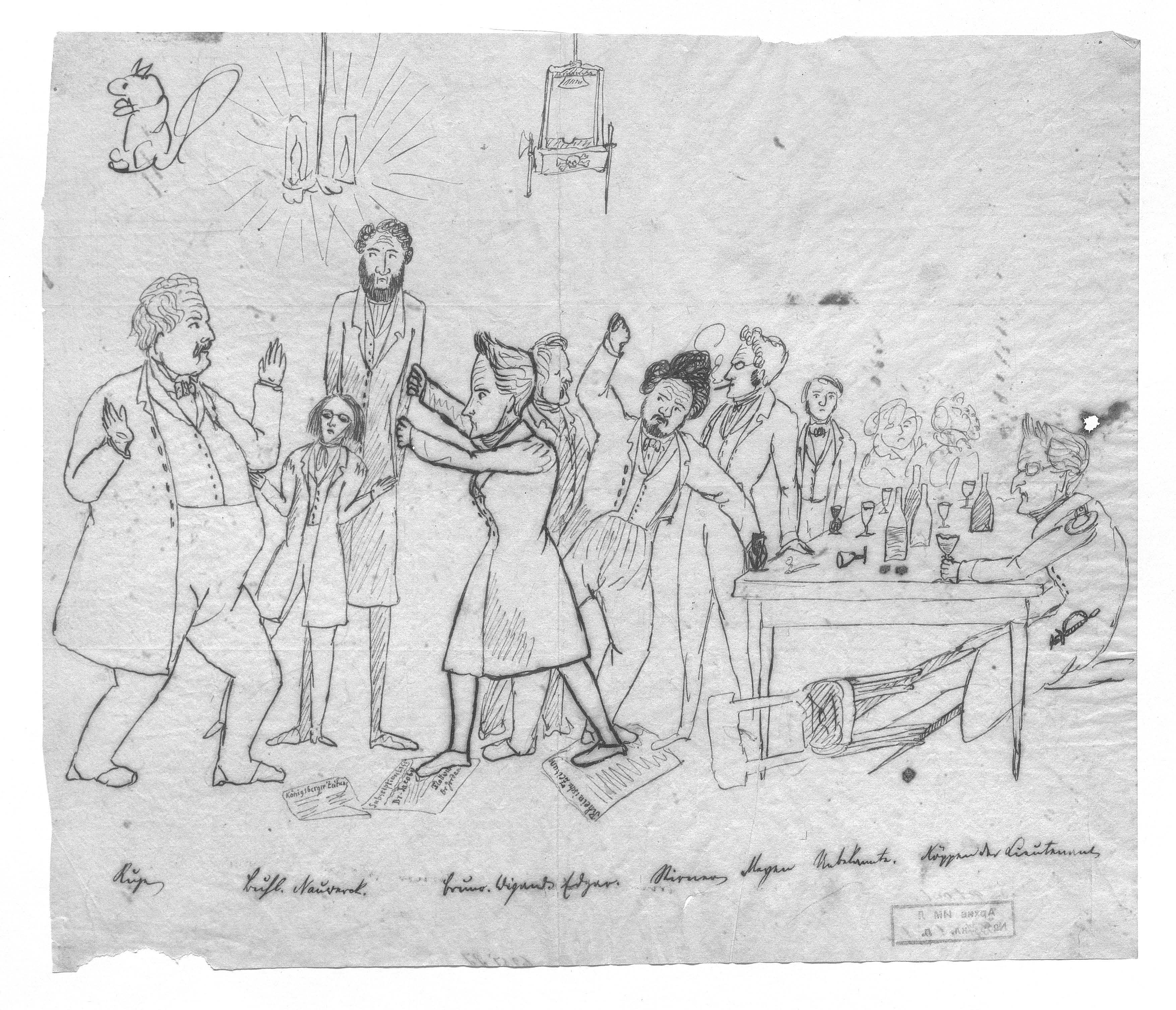
Sketch depicting the Freien by Friedrich Engels, 1842

In Berlin, the most radical Young Hegelians formed an informal discussion group known as the Doktorklub (Doctors' Club), which by 1841 evolved into a more notorious circle called Die Freien (The Free or The Freemen). Members included Bruno and Edgar Bauer, Max Stirner, and Karl Köppen. They met in a wine bar and cultivated a bohemian and highly confrontational style, becoming famous for their extreme atheism and abstract radicalism.

Several Young Hegelians were key figures in the founding of the Rheinische Zeitung, a liberal newspaper established in Cologne in late 1841. Moses Hess was a central organizer, and Karl Marx became its editor in October 1842. The newspaper served as a more popular outlet for Young Hegelian ideas, campaigning for press freedom and constitutional reform. However, a split soon developed between Marx in Cologne and the Freien in Berlin. Marx found their contributions too abstract, theatrical, and doctrinaire, complaining that they were smuggling "socialist and communist ideas... into incidental theatre reviews". He eventually broke publicly with the Berlin group, but the paper's radical tone led to its suppression by the Prussian authorities on 31 March 1843.

== Decline and legacy ==
=== Repression and fragmentation ===
The years 1842–1843 marked the swift decline and dissolution of the Young Hegelian movement as a cohesive force. The primary cause was government repression. The Prussian government, under Minister of Culture Johann Albrecht Friedrich von Eichhorn, took a series of decisive actions against the group. In February 1841, the aged philosopher Friedrich Wilhelm Joseph Schelling was brought to Berlin to "root out the dragon-seed of Hegelianism". In March 1842, Bruno Bauer was dismissed from his post at the University of Bonn, a move that ended the group's academic ambitions and was seen as a declaration of war. This was followed by the suppression of the Rheinische Zeitung and the Deutsche Jahrbücher by early 1843.

Deprived of their public platforms and academic prospects, the movement of intellectuals, which had no large-scale popular backing, quickly fragmented. The Berlin Freien reacted by adopting even more extreme theoretical positions, culminating in Stirner's egoism, while Ruge, Marx, and Hess looked to continue the struggle from abroad. A two-volume collection of censored articles, the Anekdota zur neuesten deutschen Philosophie und Publicistik (Anecdotes on the Most Recent German Philosophy and Journalism), published by Ruge in March 1843, served as the movement's last united publication, featuring articles by Ruge, Marx, Bauer, and Feuerbach's "Preliminary Theses".

=== The Deutsch-Französische Jahrbücher and turn to socialism ===
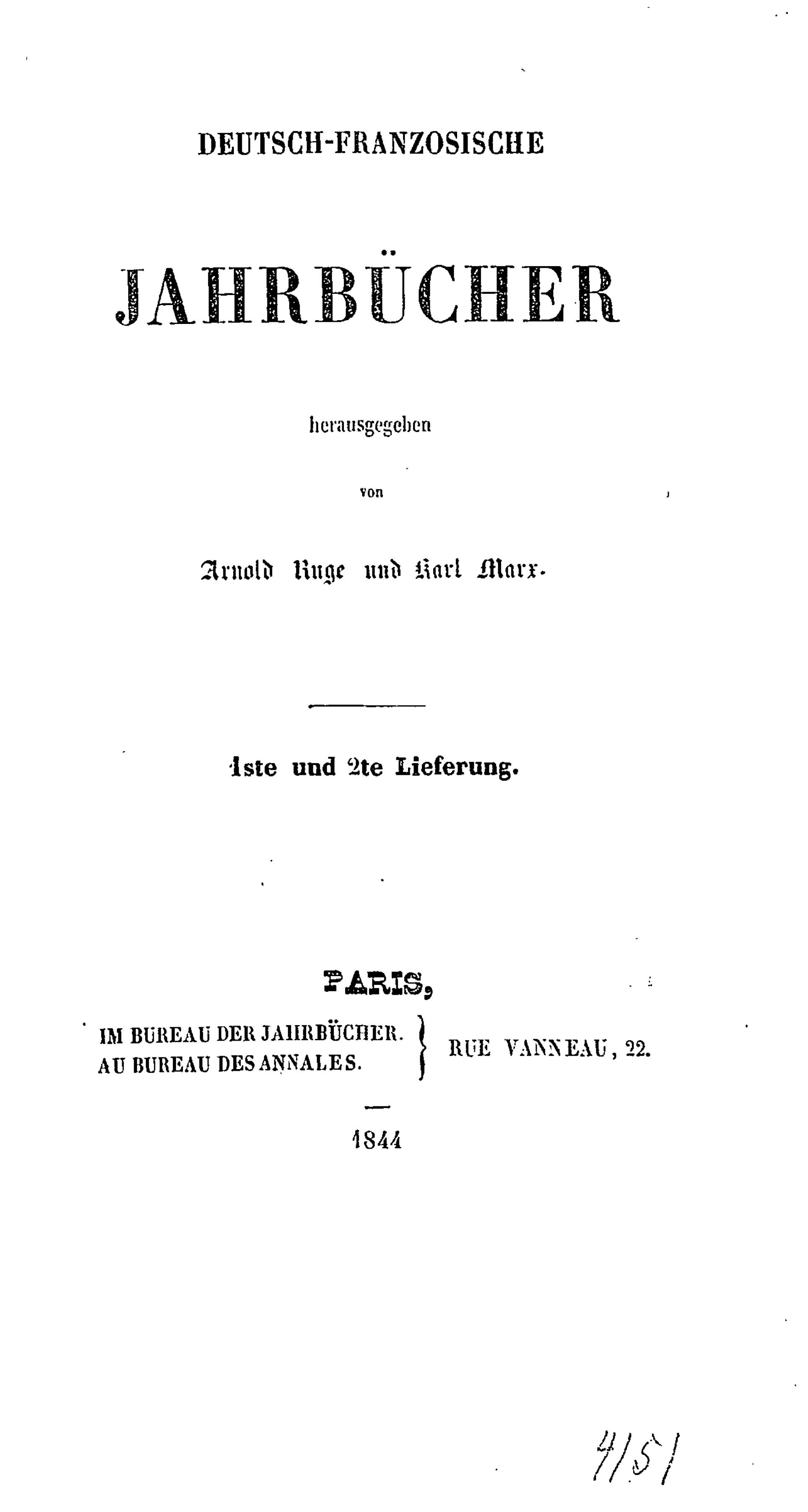
Cover of the first and only issue of the Deutsch-Französische Jahrbücher, 1844

The final chapter of the movement was the attempt by Ruge and Marx to found the Deutsch-Französische Jahrbücher (German-French Annals) in Paris in 1843. The project aimed to create an alliance between German philosophy and French socialism. However, it was plagued by doctrinal disagreements and financial troubles from the start. Ruge and Marx failed to enlist any French contributors, and their own relationship soured.

Only one double-issue was ever published, in March 1844. It contained Marx's essays "On the Jewish Question" and "Introduction to a Contribution to the Critique of Hegel's Philosophy of Right", as well as Friedrich Engels's "Outlines of a Critique of Political Economy". These works marked a definitive turn toward social and economic critique and the embrace of the proletariat as the agent of universal emancipation. The journal's failure, and Marx's subsequent break with Ruge, symbolized the end of the Young Hegelian movement and the emergence of Marxism from its intellectual matrix. By the end of 1844, with the publication of Stirner's book and Bauer's retreat into "pure criticism", the movement was "dead as a coherent force". The "last coherent expression" of the school's thought appeared in Karl Schmidt's 1846 work, The Realm of the Understanding and the Individual, which logically exhausted its philosophical potential.

=== Formulation of the theory of ideology ===
The political and social trauma of the early 1840s led the Young Hegelians to a critical re-examination of Hegelianism itself. Having been promised a harmony between philosophical reason and social reality, they were confronted with an increasingly hostile state and a chaotic civil society. Their response was to invert the traditional concept of the "sovereignty of philosophy". Instead of seeing philosophy as an autonomous and authoritative force shaping reality, they concluded it was an "ideology"—a system of abstract thought that was dependent on and determined by a deficient "mundane reality". In a series of anxious, self-lacerating "recapitulations" of Hegelianism's failure, they argued that philosophy served two main ideological functions: it compensated for the inadequacies of the real world by creating a fantasy of rational harmony in thought, and it justified the existing order by giving intellectual legitimacy to its institutions.

This new theory of ideology confronted the Young Hegelians with the problem of relativism: if all philosophical thought was ideological, how could their own critique be exempt? This "nerve-wracking leitmotif" dominated their later work. Bauer and Ruge failed to resolve the contradiction, remaining loyal to philosophical reason and thus unable to escape the "German ideology" they criticized. Marx, however, found a solution by abandoning philosophy altogether and embracing the "hegemony of sensuousness". He grounded his theory in the concrete reality of the proletariat, an "unphilosophical" perspective that he believed was synchronized with reality and therefore objective. This led to his systematic formulation of historical materialism in The German Ideology (1845–1846), a project that marked the "uncompromising completion" of the Young Hegelians' ambivalent search for a new relation to reality and the creation of a formal theory of ideology.

=== Influence on Karl Marx ===
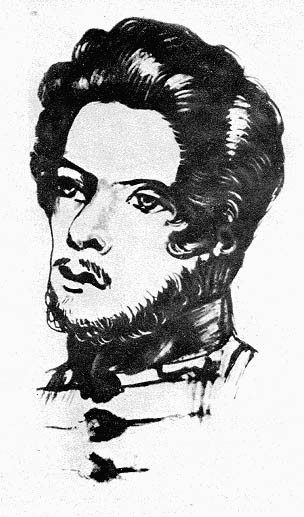
Depiction of the young Karl Marx

The Young Hegelians formed the immediate intellectual context for the development of Karl Marx's thought. His philosophy emerged through a process of adopting, transforming, and ultimately transcending the ideas of his contemporaries. Marx's "philosophical apprenticeship" ended around 1845, by which time he had established his own distinct system. The movement's central critique of Christian personalism provided the conceptual framework for Marx's subsequent critique of liberal democracy and its concept of individual autonomy. Marx's analysis of the "political state" in his 1843 writings emerged directly from his prior engagement with the Young Hegelian critique of the "Christian state," transferring the critique of theological personalism to the secular realm of liberal rights.

- From Bruno Bauer, Marx inherited the model of incisive, radical criticism. Bauer's critique of religion as alienation served as a template for Marx's later analysis of the alienation inherent in politics and economics.
- Ludwig Feuerbach provided the crucial bridge away from Hegelian idealism. Marx adopted Feuerbach's "transformative method", his rejection of the Hegelian Idea in favor of a radical humanism, and his focus on humanity's "species-essence".
- Moses Hess pioneered the application of the concept of alienation to the economic sphere. His analysis of money as the practical alienation of human social activity was a direct precursor to Marx's early economic writings.
- Max Stirner's critique of all abstractions, including Feuerbach's "Man", compelled Marx to move beyond a static, ahistorical humanism. Stirner's attack on "true socialism" pushed Marx to ground his philosophy not in abstract ideals but in the real, historical development of material society, a key step toward the formulation of historical materialism.

Marx's mature philosophy was a systematic synthesis and critique of these influences. As David McLellan concludes, a knowledge of this "contemporary intellectual scene and of the concepts peculiar to it" is essential for a just appreciation of Marx's thought.

== See also ==
- Neo-Hegelianism
- The Holy Family – 1845 book by Marx and Engels critiquing the Young Hegelians
