= Arnold Ruge =

German political agitator and writer

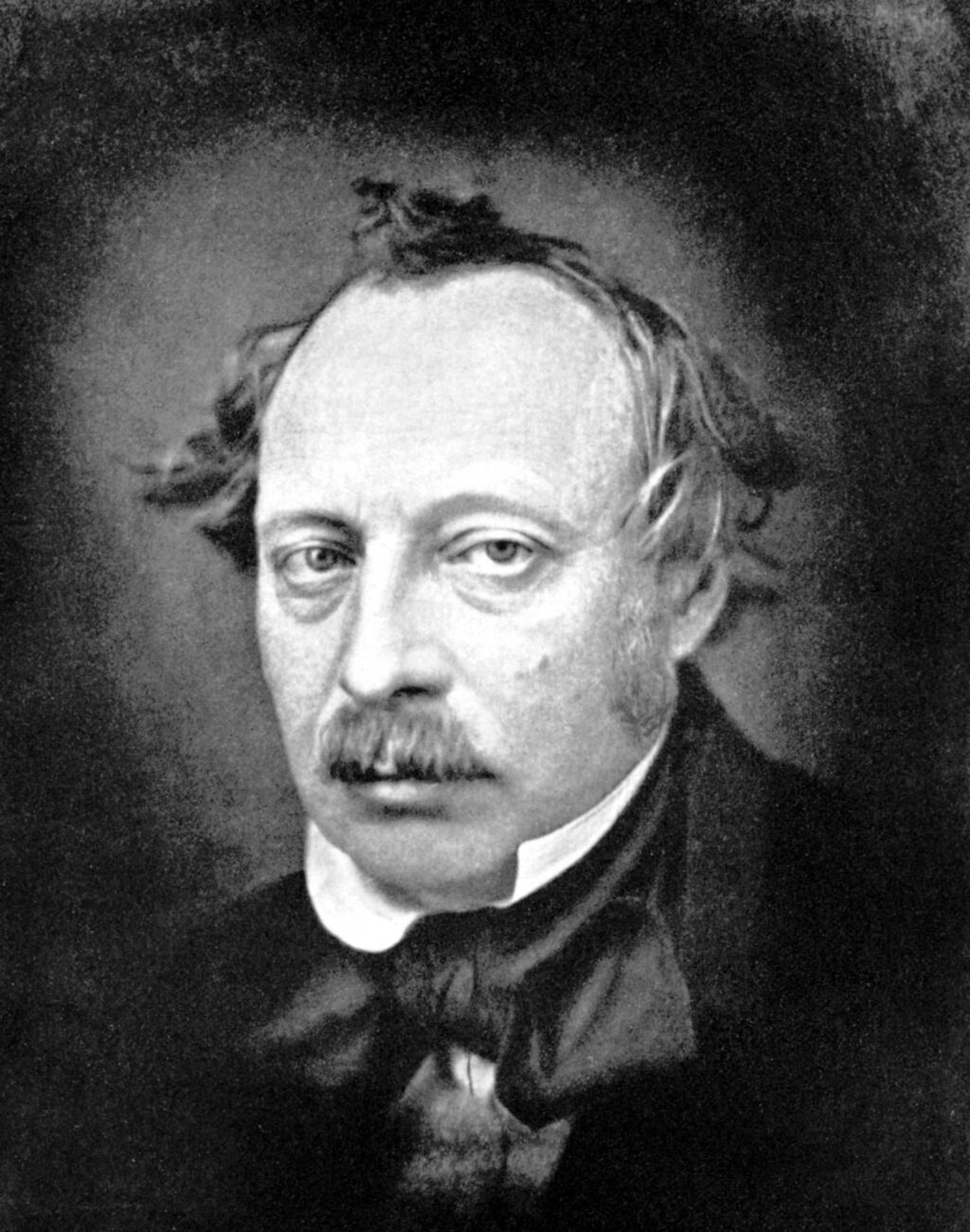
- Born: 13 September 1802; Bergen auf Rügen, Swedish Pomerania, Holy Roman Empire
- Died: 31 December 1880 (aged 78); Brighton, England

Education
- Education: University of Halle; University of Jena; Heidelberg University

Philosophical work
- Era: 19th-century philosophy
- Region: Western philosophy
- School: Young Hegelians

Arnold Ruge (German: [ˈʁuːɡə]; 13 September 1802 – 31 December 1880) was a German philosopher and political writer. He was the older brother of Ludwig Ruge.

== Studies in university and prison ==
Born in Bergen auf Rügen, he studied at Halle, Jena and Heidelberg. As an advocate of a free and united Germany, he took part in the student agitations of 1821–1824 and was jailed from 1824 to 1830 in the fortress of Kolberg, where he studied Plato and the Greek poets. Moving to Halle on his release, he published a number of plays (including Schill und die Seinen, a tragedy) and translations of ancient Greek texts (e.g. Oedipus at Colonus). He became a Privatdozent at the University of Halle in 1832.

== Hegelians ==
He also became associated with the Young Hegelians. In 1837, with Ernst Theodor Echtermeyer, he founded the Hallesche Jahrbücher für deutsche Kunst und Wissenschaft. In this periodical he discussed the questions of the time from the point of view of the Hegelian philosophy. According to Frederick Copleston:

"Ruge shared Hegel's belief that history is a progressive advance towards the realization of freedom, and that freedom is attained in the State, the creation of the rational General Will.[...] At the same time he criticized Hegel for having given an interpretation of history which was closed to the future, in the sense that it left no room for novelty."

The Jahrbücher was detested by the orthodox party in Prussia; and was finally suppressed by the Saxon government in 1843, and Ruge left for Paris.

In Paris, Ruge co-edited the Deutsch–Französische Jahrbücher with Karl Marx briefly. He had little sympathy with Marx's socialistic theories, and soon left him. He left Paris in 1845 for Switzerland, and then became a bookseller in Leipzig.

== Revolutions of 1848 ==
In the revolutionary movement of 1848, he organized the extreme left in the Frankfurt Parliament, and for some time he lived in Berlin as the editor of the Die Reform. He supported the Polish demands during the revolution, but based on his belief that failure to meet Polish demands would result in Russia unleashing "the hatred of the entire Slavic element, of this monstrous family of peoples."

The Prussian government intervened and Ruge soon afterwards left again for Paris, hoping, through his friend Alexandre Ledru-Rollin, to establish relations between German and French republicans; but in 1849 both Ledru-Rollin and Ruge had to take refuge in London.

== London and Brighton ==
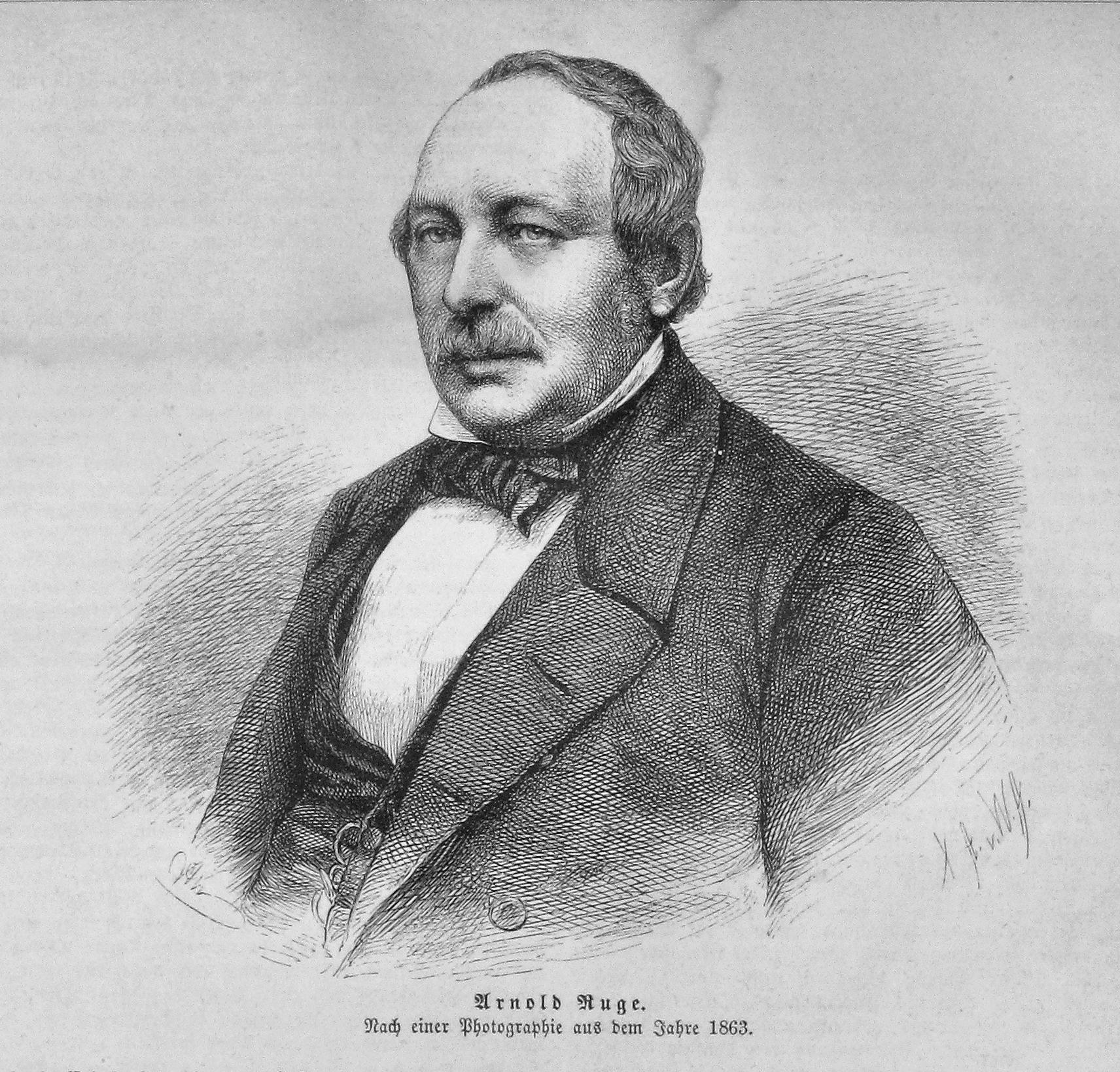
Ruge in 1863

In London, in company with Giuseppe Mazzini and other advanced politicians, he formed a "European Democratic Committee." From this Ruge soon withdrew, and in 1850, Ruge moved to Brighton to live as a teacher and writer. In 1866, he vigorously supported Prussia against Austria in the Austro-Prussian War, and in 1870, he supported Germany against France in the Franco-Prussian War. On a smaller scale, while in Brighton, he was chairman of the successful Park Crescent Residents' Association. In his last years, beginning in 1877, he received from the German government a pension of 1000 marks.

He died in Brighton in 1880.

== Works ==
In his time, Ruge was a leader in religious and political liberalism. In 1846–1848 his Gesammelte Schriften (Collected writings) were published in ten volumes. After this time he wrote, among other books:

- Manifest an die deutsche Nation (1866)
- Geschichte unserer Zeit (1881), Unser System
- Revolutionsnovellen, Die Loge des Humanismus
- Aus früherer Zeit (his memoirs; 1863–1867).

He also wrote many poems, and several dramas and romances, and translated into German various English works, including:

- Letters of Junius
- Buckle's History of Civilization

His Letters and Diary (1825–80) were published by Paul Nerrlich (Berlin, 1885–1887). See A. W. Bolin's L. Feuerbach, pp. 127–52 (Stuttgart, 1891).

An anthology edited by Franck Fischbach includes five of his essays. Selected translations from German to French, including besides Ruge: Karl Marx, Mikhaïl Bakounine, Bruno Bauer, Edgar Bauer, Ludwig Feuerbach, Moses Hess, Karl Friedrich Köppen, and Max Stirner: Les Jeunes Hégéliens : politique, religion, philosophie. Une anthologie, Paris: Gallimard, coll. "NRF, Bibliothèque de Philosophie", 384 p., 2022. ISBN 9782072895241.

== See also ==
- Karl Friedrich Köppen
