= Karl Friedrich Köppen =

German teacher and political journalist

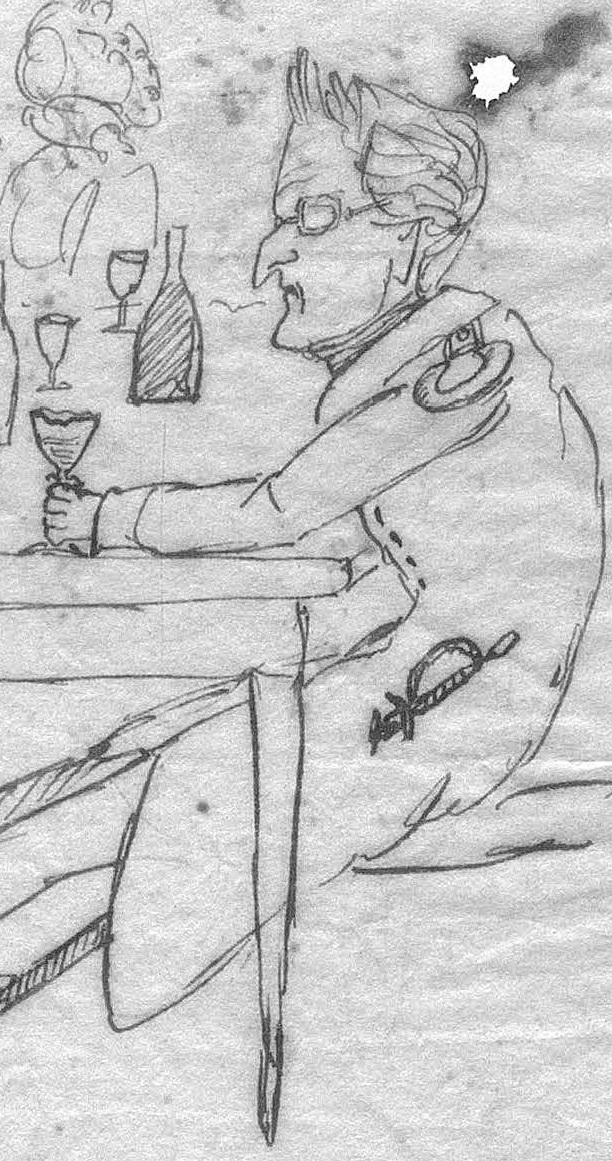
- Portrait of Köppen from a sketch by Friedrich Engels, 1842
- Born: April 26, 1808; Nieder-Görne, Altmark, Kingdom of Prussia
- Died: April 26, 1863 (aged 55); Berlin, Kingdom of Prussia
- Education: Königliche Friedrich-Wilhelms-Universität zu Berlin
- Era: 19th century
- Notable work: Frederick the Great and his Opponents
- Movement: Young Hegelians

Karl Friedrich Köppen (26 April 1808 – 26 April 1863) was a German teacher and political journalist. He was one of the Young Hegelians.

== Life ==
Köppen was born in a pastor's family in Nieder-Görne, a small municipality in the Altmark. He studied theology at the University of Berlin from 1827 to 1831, but later turned to religio-critical Hegelianism. After his studies and military service in 1833, he taught at the secondary school Dorotheenstädtischer. In 1837, he met Karl Marx, with whom he developed a close friendship.

In 1840 he became one of the most active associates of Arnold Ruge, the founder of the Hallischen Jahrbücher (1841: Deutsche Jahrbücher). He wrote many reviews on political and scientific literature. Contemporary journalistic practice has been strongly influenced by his opinions reviews. He thus began a renewal of the Enlightenment as Köppen's criticism of classical literature, idealist philosophy and Romanticism. Köppen's views were deeply indebted to Karl Marx and he dedicated his book Frederick the Great and his Opponents to Marx.

He died in Berlin.

== Works ==
- Literarische Einleitung in die nordische Mythologie. Berlin: Bechtold und Hartje, 1837
- Friedrich der Große und seine Widersacher. Leipzig: Verlag Otto Wigand, 1840 ISBN 1-161-25072-7
- Die Religion des Buddha. 2 vol., Berlin: F. Schneider 1857–1859. Vol. 1, Die Religion des Buddha und ihre Entstehung, Vol. 2, Die lamaische Hierarchie und Kirche
- Hexen und Hexenprozesse. Zur Geschichte des Aberglaubens und des inquisitorischen Prozesses. 2. Aufl., Leipzig: O. Wigand, 1858
- Ausgewählte Schriften. edited by Heinz Pepperle. 2 vol., Berlin: Akademie-Verlag, 2003 ISBN 3-05-003625-7

== Sources ==
- Foster, John Bellamy (2000). Marx's Ecology. New York: Monthly Review Press.
- Hirsch, Helmut (1936). "Karl Friedrich Köppen. Der intimste Berliner Freund Marxens". International Review for Social History. 1: 311–370. doi:10.1017/S1873084100000082.
- Pepperle, Heinz (2003). Einleitung, in Karl Friedrich Köppen Ausgewählte Schriften in zwei Bänden, Band 1. Berlin: Akademie Verlag. ISBN 3-05-003625-7.
