= The Holy Family (book) =

1845 book by Karl Marx and Friedrich Engels

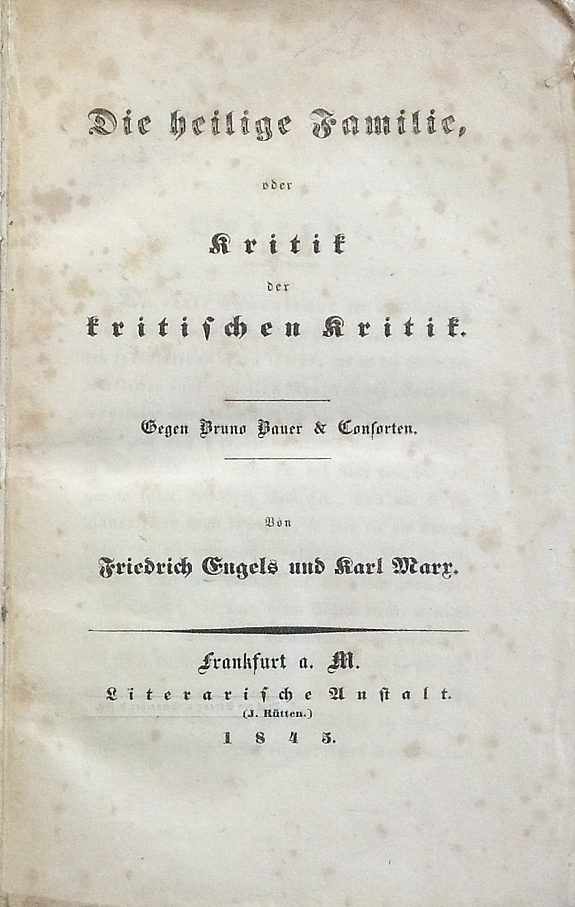
Title page of the first edition, 1845

The Holy Family, or Critique of Critical Critique (German: Die heilige Familie, oder Kritik der kritischen Kritik) is a book written by Karl Marx and Friedrich Engels in November 1844 and published in 1845. The book is a critique of the Young Hegelians and their trend of thought, which was very popular in academic circles at the time. The title was a suggestion by the publisher and is meant as a sarcastic reference to the Bauer Brothers and their supporters. The book created a controversy with much of the press and caused Bruno Bauer to refute the book in an article which was published in Wigand's Vierteljahrsschrift in 1845. Bauer claimed that Marx and Engels misunderstood what he was saying. Marx later replied to his response with his own article that was published in the journal Gesellschaftsspiegel in January 1846. Marx also discussed the argument in the second chapter of The German Ideology.

== History ==
During Engels' short stay in Paris in 1844, Marx suggested that they should write together a critique of the rage of their day, the Young Hegelians. While accomplishing their plan, the first joint writing project between them was accomplished and thus the beginning of their friendship.

After conversing, they began drawing up plans for a book about the Young Hegelian trend of thought very popular in academic circles. Agreeing to co-author the foreword, they divided up the other sections. Engels finished his assigned chapters before leaving Paris. Marx had the larger share of work, and he completed it by the end of November 1844. Marx would draw from his Economic and Philosophic Manuscripts, on which he had been working the spring and summer of 1844.

The foremost title line, The Holy Family, was added at the suggestion of the book publisher Lowenthal. It is a sarcastic reference to the Bauer brothers (Bruno and Edgar) and their supporters amongst the Hegelians who had attempted a critical renovation of Christianity, hence the subtitle A Critique of Critical Critique. Later Marx will continue this sarcasm by referring to them as Saint Bruno, Saint Max (Stirner), etc.

The book made something of a splash in the newspapers. One paper noted that it expressed socialist views since it criticized the "inadequacy of any half-measures directed at eliminating the social ailments of our time."

== Content ==
The Holy Family is among the earlier works of Marx and Engels which discusses the concept behind the later-coined term false consciousness. Marx describes how communist workers are able to break out of the false consciousness prevalent under capitalism:

They (the communist workers) are most painfully aware of the difference between being and thinking, between consciousness and life. They know that property, capital, money, wage-labor and the like are no ideal figments of the brain but very practical, very objective products of their self-estrangement.

— Karl Marx and Friedrich Engels, The Holy Family, Chapter IV. "Critical Criticism" as the Tranquillity of Knowledge, or "Critical Criticism" as Herr Edgar, Section on Proudhon.
