= The German Ideology =

Work by Karl Marx and Friedrich Engels, written 1845–1846

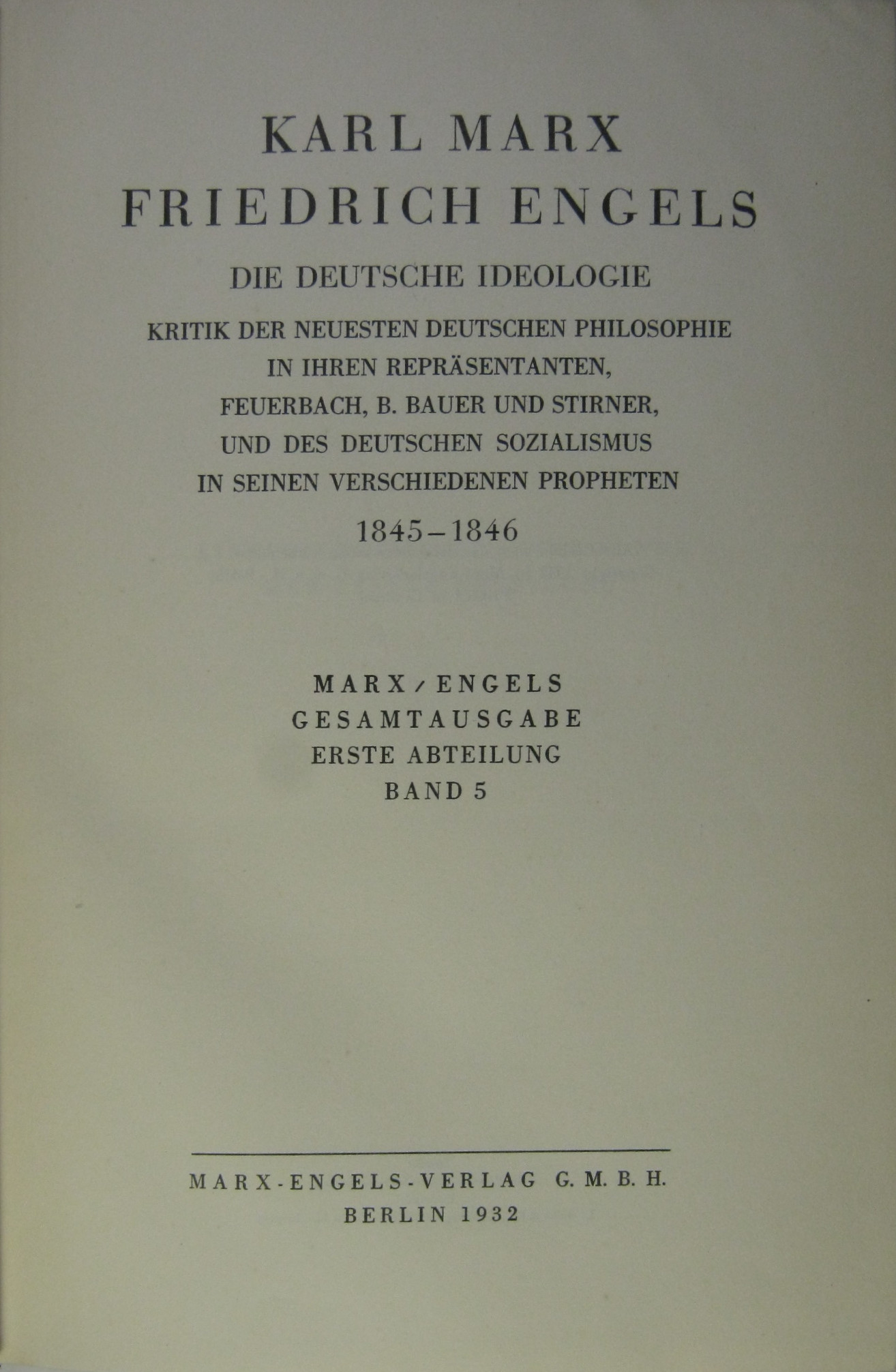
- Title page of the first edition
- Author: Karl Marx and Friedrich Engels
- Original title: Die Deutsche Ideologie
- Language: German
- Subject: Historical materialism, philosophy, history
- Published: 1932
- Publisher: Marx-Engels Institute
- Publication place: Berlin, Germany
- The work was written in 1845–1846 and published posthumously.

The German Ideology (German: Die Deutsche Ideologie) is a work written by Karl Marx and Friedrich Engels in 1845–1846. After their failure to find a publisher, Marx famously remarked that they had left it to "the gnawing criticism of the mice"; it went unpublished during their lifetimes. The book as it is known today is an editorial construction from the manuscripts first published in their entirety in 1932 by the Marx-Engels Institute in Moscow. It marks the authors' definitive break from German idealism and sets the foundation for their later economic and political works, including The Communist Manifesto and Das Kapital.

The German Ideology is a major work of political and philosophical thought, considered the first to be recognizably "Marxist". In it, Marx and Engels articulate for the first time their materialist conception of history, also known as historical materialism. This new worldview posits that the material conditions of individuals' lives—specifically their mode of production—form the basis of society and that consciousness and ideas are products of these material realities, not the other way around. The famous formulation, "Life is not determined by consciousness, but consciousness by life," originates from this text.

The published book is divided into three parts, though the original manuscript was left incomplete and unrevised. Part I, "Feuerbach", contains the most systematic exposition of historical materialism and is the most frequently published and studied section, often being read in isolation. Parts II and III consist of detailed and often satirical polemics against some of their fellow German philosophers, particularly Bruno Bauer and Max Stirner, as well as a critique of "True Socialism". Marx and Engels accused these "Young Hegelians" of engaging in a purely philosophical struggle against "phrases" rather than critiquing the real, material world from which those phrases arose.

== Background ==
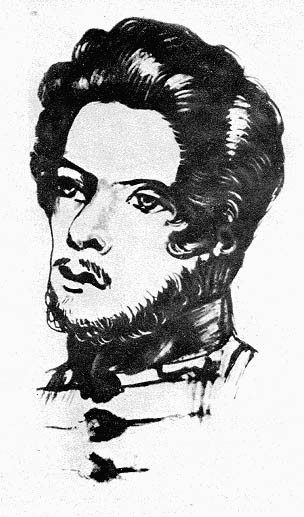
Karl Marx

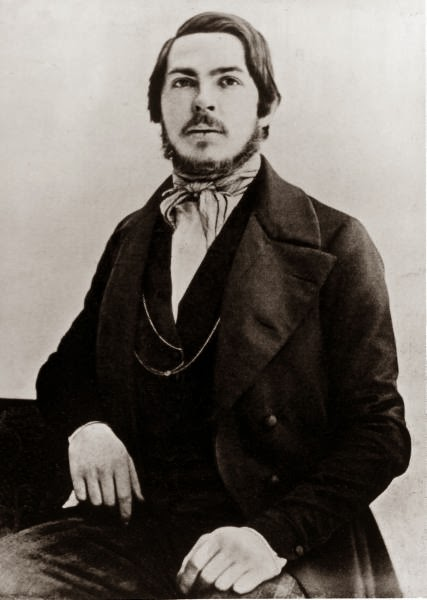
Friedrich Engels

The German Ideology was written during a period of intense intellectual development for both Karl Marx and Friedrich Engels, representing a key moment of "self-clarification" and the synthesis of their new worldview. In 1846, it was the first work to be written that could be described as distinctly "Marxist". Its creation followed a series of earlier writings in which Marx and Engels progressively broke from the German idealism of Georg Wilhelm Friedrich Hegel and the Young Hegelians.

Marx's early work, particularly his essays in the Deutsch–Französische Jahrbücher (1844), had already shifted the focus of critique from the state to "civil society" (bürgerliche Gesellschaft). In "On the Jewish Question", Marx argued that genuine human emancipation required overcoming the division between the abstract political citizen and the egoistic individual of civil society, a sphere dominated by private interests and economic conflict. In his "Contribution to the Critique of Hegel's Philosophy of Right", Marx identified the proletariat for the first time as the historical agent capable of achieving this "universal emancipation".

The concept of alienation, central to Marx's Economic and Philosophic Manuscripts of 1844, was also a crucial precursor. Marx rooted alienation not in consciousness (as did the Hegelians) but in the material process of labour under capitalism. He argued that under conditions of "alienated labour", the worker's own product confronts him as a hostile power, and the process of work itself becomes an external, oppressive activity. Crucially, Marx concluded that private property was not the cause but "the product, the result, the necessary consequence, of alienated labour".

Engels's work also provided a vital impetus. His 1844 essay, "Outlines of a Critique of Political Economy", published in the Jahrbücher, sparked Marx's intensive study of political economy. In July 1844, Engels met Marx in Paris, beginning their lifelong collaboration. Together they wrote The Holy Family (1845), a polemic against the Young Hegelian Bruno Bauer, which contained hints of their developing dialectical approach to history, analyzing the proletariat and private property as a unified antithesis whose resolution required the abolition of both.

The German Ideology represents the culmination of this period. It was here that Marx and Engels made their definitive break from the humanism of Ludwig Feuerbach, whom they had previously admired. While Feuerbach had inverted Hegelianism by arguing that God was a human projection, Marx and Engels criticized him for remaining in the realm of abstract ideas and for viewing "Man" ahistorically. Instead, they formulated their materialist conception of history, arguing that human beings and their ideas are shaped not by abstract essences but by the concrete, material conditions of their lives, which they create and recreate through labour.

== Writing and manuscript ==
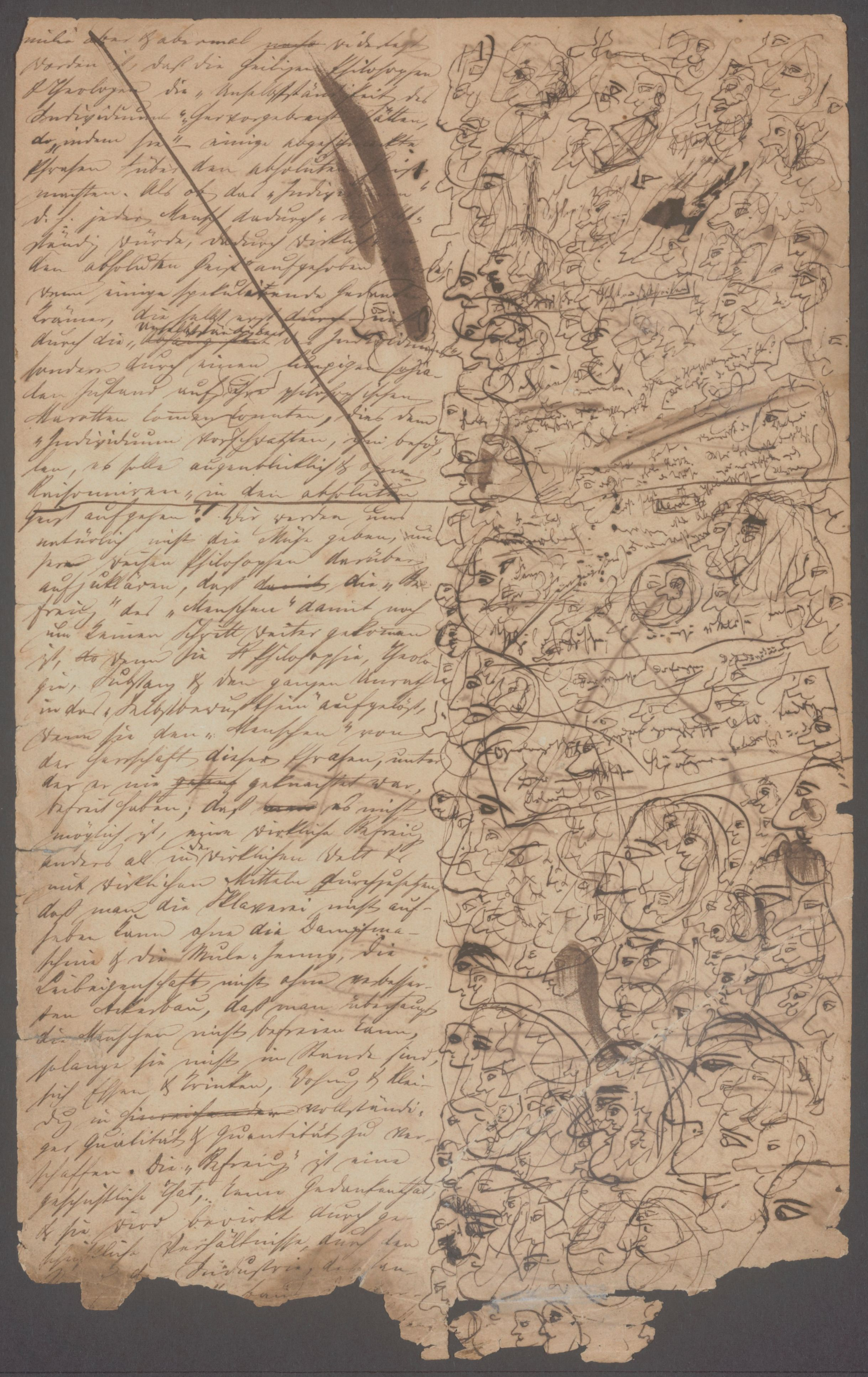
Page from the manuscript for The German Ideology, with Marx's handwriting and Engels's doodles

The bulk of The German Ideology was written between November 1845 and the summer of 1846. The complete manuscript was a substantial work, comprising two large volumes totaling over 700 pages, the majority of which consisted of detailed, line-by-line polemics against contemporaries. The first volume was largely a critique of the views of Bruno Bauer and Max Stirner, while the second volume was dedicated to attacking the proponents of "True Socialism". The first section of Volume I, ostensibly a critique of Ludwig Feuerbach, was written later, in the second half of 1846, but was never completed.

The project began as an effort to publish a quarterly journal. At the suggestion of Moses Hess, Marx and Engels were to co-author critiques for the journal, which was to be financed by two "true socialist" businessmen, Julius Meyer and Rudolph Rempel. In May 1846, the main part of the manuscript was sent from Brussels to Joseph Weydemeyer in Westphalia, who was to arrange for its publication. However, when the publishers expressed disapproval of the polemical content and later withdrew their financial backing, the project collapsed. Throughout 1846 and 1847, Marx and Engels made repeated but unsuccessful attempts to find another publisher in Germany. The failure was partly due to difficulties with the police and partly because publishers were reluctant to print the work, as their sympathies lay with the philosophical trends that Marx and Engels attacked.

Having failed to find a publisher, Marx and Engels abandoned the project. In a public declaration from 1847, Marx stated that he had left the materials "to the sleep of the just". He would later recall this episode in his 1859 book A Contribution to the Critique of Political Economy, writing: "we abandoned the manuscript to the gnawing criticism of the mice all the more willingly as we had achieved our main purpose—self-clarification." This statement highlights Marx's own view of the manuscripts as an unfinished work whose primary value was in the authors' own intellectual development. The manuscript remained unpublished during the authors' lifetimes.

The physical state of the manuscript was chaotic. It was a set of "very rough, discontinuous, and hitherto unwanted manuscripts" that were never revised into a finished book. Some pages were missing, and the text was filled with marginalia. The authors never completed or revised the work into a structured whole, posing a "considerable editorial problem" for later editors, who constructed the published versions of the text in the 20th century.

== Content ==
The German Ideology is divided into a preface and three main parts, though the work as a whole is incomplete. Part I contains the foundational exposition of the materialist conception of history, while Parts II and III consist of extensive polemics.

=== Part I: Critique of Modern German Philosophy ===
This part, subtitled "Opposition of the Materialist and Idealist Outlook," is the most well-known and widely read section of the book. It begins by satirizing the Young Hegelians, whom Marx and Engels dismiss as "philosophic heroes" who mistake their intellectual battles with ideas for world-changing revolutions. They argue that these critics, despite their "world-shattering" statements, remain "the staunchest conservatives" because they only fight against "phrases" and never challenge the real, material world that produces these phrases. According to Marx and Engels, the substantive arguments of their own philosophy are developed "as political points through and through", in contrast to the abstract truths sought by the idealists.

==== Materialist conception of history ====
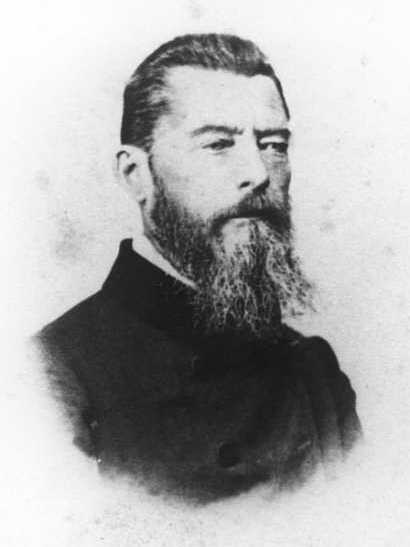
Ludwig Feuerbach

In contrast to the idealist philosophy of their contemporaries, Marx and Engels present their new materialist method. Their starting point is not ideas, but "real individuals, their activity and the material conditions under which they live". This approach was a new form of materialism, distinct from what Marx called the "contemplative" materialism of Feuerbach. In his "Theses on Feuerbach", written shortly before The German Ideology, Marx had critiqued "all previous materialism" for viewing reality as an object of contemplation rather than as human "sensuous activity, practice".

The new materialism defines "actuality" in terms of "sociality and history," where material conditions and human activity intersect in practice. The fundamental condition of all human history is the necessity for human beings to produce their means of subsistence.

Men can be distinguished from animals by consciousness, by religion or anything else you like. They themselves begin to distinguish themselves from animals as soon as they begin to produce their means of subsistence, a step which is conditioned by their physical organisation. By producing their means of subsistence men are indirectly producing their actual material life.

This production of material life is the basis of society. The "mode of production" determines the social, political, and intellectual life of individuals. This relationship is famously summarized in the reversal of the Hegelian axiom: "Life is not determined by consciousness, but consciousness by life." "Civil society," which embraces the whole material intercourse of individuals, is identified as "the true source and theatre of all history". This view also entails a historicization of nature itself; Marx and Engels refer to "a historical nature and a natural history," arguing that the natural world in which humans live is one that has been fundamentally shaped by human industry.

The development of the productive forces gives rise to the division of labour, which in turn determines the forms of property. Marx and Engels outline a history of ownership, beginning with tribal property, moving to the communal and state property of antiquity (based on the slavery of the city-state), and then to the feudal or estate property of the Middle Ages.

==== Alienation, the state, and communism ====
The division of labour creates a contradiction between the interest of the individual and the "communal interest." To mediate this contradiction, the communal interest takes on an independent form as the state. The state becomes an "illusory communal life," a separate entity that stands above society while in reality serving the interests of the dominant class. Consequently, "all struggles within the State ... are merely the illusory forms in which the real struggles of the different classes are fought out." The ideas of this ruling class are, in every epoch, the "ruling ideas".

This social division also leads to alienation. The division of labour results in "man's own deed" becoming "an alien power opposed to him, which enslaves him instead of being controlled by him." The manuscript shows Marx's growing dissatisfaction with the philosophical term "alienation," as he edits the text to replace it with less abstract terms such as "intolerable power". In modern society, this social power appears to individuals as an external, uncontrollable force, such as the market. In a famous passage, Marx and Engels contrast this with life in a communist society:

in communist society, where nobody has one exclusive sphere of activity but each can become accomplished in any branch he wishes, society regulates the general production and thus makes it possible for me to do one thing today and another to-morrow, to hunt in the morning, fish in the afternoon, rear cattle in the evening, criticise after dinner, just as I have a mind, without ever becoming hunter, fisherman, herdsman or critic.

Communism is not presented as a "state of affairs which is to be established, an ideal to which reality [will] have to adjust itself." Rather, it is "the real movement which abolishes the present state of things." This movement is only made possible by specific material premises: the universal development of productive forces and the establishment of "world-historical" intercourse, which create a "propertyless" mass (the proletariat) on a global scale and make each nation dependent on the revolutions of others.

=== Parts II and III: Polemics ===
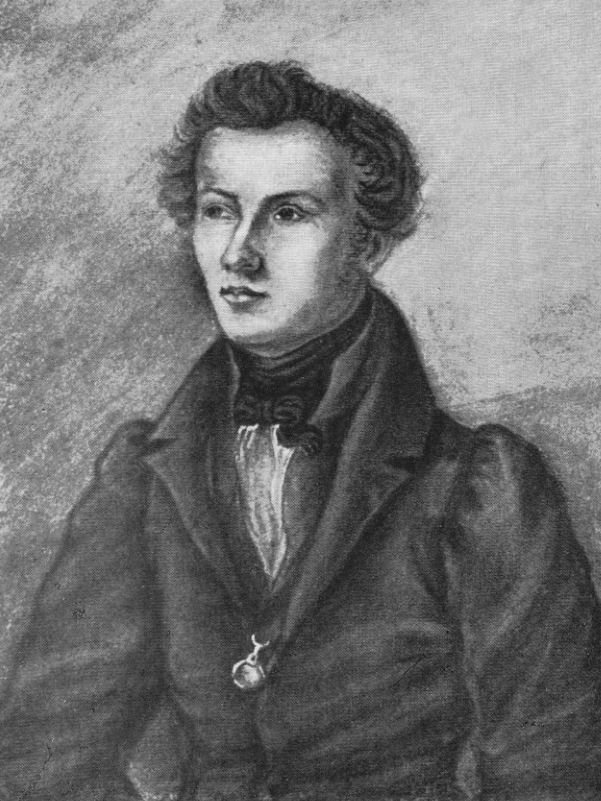
Bruno Bauer

The latter parts of The German Ideology, which constitute the bulk of the original manuscript, are dedicated to lengthy critiques of Bruno Bauer, Max Stirner, and the "True Socialists". These sections are less focused on the exposition of Marx and Engels's own theory and are characterized by detailed, often satirical, attacks on the texts of their opponents. The substantive arguments of the work are developed through these polemics, rather than existing independently of them.

==== Critique of Max Stirner ====
Max Stirner

The critique of Max Stirner and his book The Ego and Its Own is particularly extensive, taking up more than two-thirds of the entire manuscript. Stirner, an extreme individualist anarchist, argued that all abstract concepts—such as God, humanity, the state, and the law—were "spooks" or "phantoms" of the mind that enslaved the individual Ego. He saw all causes beyond his own as manifestations of "the Holy".

Marx and Engels ridicule Stirner's philosophy as the ultimate expression of idealism, arguing that he merely fights against the idea of these concepts in his mind, leaving their real-world basis untouched. They contend that Stirner does not realize that concepts like the state or money are not just ideas to be dismissed but expressions of real material relations. By "changing only his conception," Stirner leaves everything as it is. Marx and Engels argue that Stirner's "Unique" individual is itself an abstraction, divorced from the complex unity of social life that actually constitutes a person. In the 1960s and 1970s, thinkers such as C. J. Arthur argued for a positive re-evaluation of Stirner's influence, suggesting that his critique of abstractions helped push Marx towards a more concrete materialist position. This view ran counter to the mainstream Soviet-Marxist interpretation, which dismissed Stirner as a "petit-bourgeois author" and an "intellectual trailblazer of fascism".

==== Critique of "True Socialism" ====
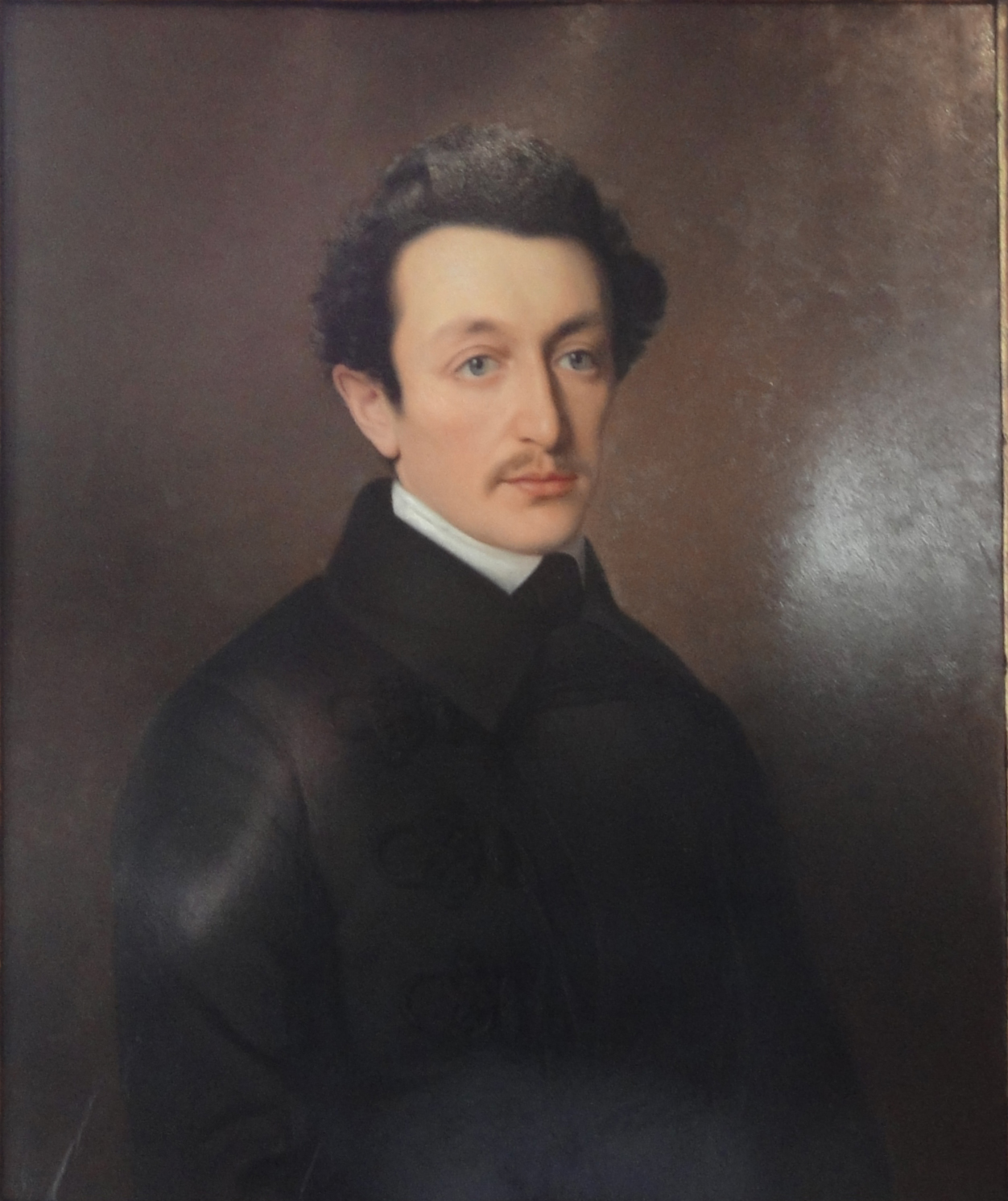
Moses Hess

The final section of the work is an attack on a group of German intellectuals known as the "True Socialists," including Moses Hess. Marx and Engels criticize them for misunderstanding the nature of the communist movement. Instead of seeing it as a movement arising from the needs and situation of a particular class (the proletariat), the "True Socialists" sought to give it a more "elevated tone" by basing it on abstract philosophical principles about "Man" or "human nature".

Marx and Engels argue that these writers had simply absorbed French and English communist ideas and "amalgamated them with their own German philosophical premises," stripping them of their connection to any real movement. By detaching communist ideas from the real historical conditions of their origin and connecting them instead to German philosophy, they had turned a real movement into a purely literary and ideological affair, fabricating a "fantastic relationship" between communism and the "absolute".

== Publication history ==
The history of the editions of The German Ideology is a "political history" deeply embedded in the ideological struggles of the 20th century. The transformation of the chaotic manuscript materials into a published book was a politically charged process, with different editorial teams shaping the text to fit their own interpretations of Marxism.

Small portions of the manuscript were published during Marx and Engels's lifetimes. A short article critiquing Bruno Bauer was anonymously published in the journal Gesellschaftsspiegel in January 1846, and two other articles on "True Socialism" appeared in 1847. After Engels's death, Eduard Bernstein published larger sections of the critique of Max Stirner between 1903 and 1904.

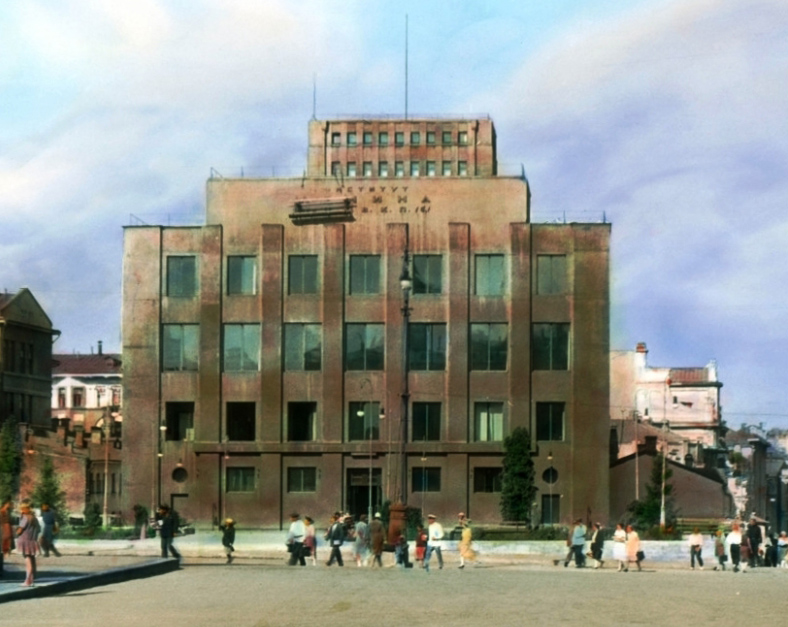
Marx-Engels Institute building in Moscow, 1931

The "political history" of the work began in earnest in the 1920s. The manuscripts, which had been in the possession of the Social Democratic Party archives and Bernstein, became the subject of a dispute between the German Social Democrats and the newly founded Marx-Engels Institute in Moscow. In 1921, Social Democratic historian Gustav Mayer published parts of the critique of Bauer and Stirner. Soon after, David Riazanov, director of the Marx-Engels Institute, published the first edition of the "Feuerbach" chapter in Russian (1924) and German (1926), presenting it as the key to understanding the materialist conception of history.

The first complete edition of The German Ideology was published in German in 1932 as part of the Marx-Engels-Gesamtausgabe (MEGA), edited by the Marx-Engels Institute in Moscow under Vladimir Adoratsky. This landmark edition was a "logical" construction, in which the editors arranged the manuscript fragments to create a coherent and systematic text, thereby establishing the "Feuerbach" chapter as the foundational exposition of historical materialism. This arrangement was driven by the political need in the Stalinist era to present a definitive, foundational text of Marxism.

During the Cold War, the text's publication remained ideologically contested. In 1953, Siegfried Landshut published an edition in West Germany that emphasized Marx's early humanist writings and presented an idealist interpretation of The German Ideology, omitting large portions of the polemics. This was contrasted with the 1958 edition from the East German Institute of Marxism-Leninism, published as part of the Marx-Engels-Werke (MEW). The MEW edition followed the Moscow-approved scientific interpretation of Marxism-Leninism, presenting the text as a finished, authoritative work.

Modern scholarship has moved away from these constructed versions. The discovery of long-lost manuscript pages in 1962 initiated a new phase of research, leading to editions that prioritized the chronological order of the manuscripts and the raw, unfinished nature of the text, such as the 1966 German edition in the Deutsche Zeitschrift für Philosophie and the 1972 MEGA "Probeband" (trial volume). Modern editions, such as the one edited by C. J. Arthur, have attempted to organize the material and add section headings to improve readability, though the arrangement of some sections remains a matter of editorial discretion.

== Legacy ==
The German Ideology holds a significant place in the Marxist canon as the first comprehensive exposition of the materialist conception of history. Editor C. J. Arthur calls it the "first recognisably 'Marxist' work" and the location of the "breakthrough" that marked Marx and Engels's final departure from their "German philosophical past". The work has been praised as the "first mature work of Marxism" and the "birth certificate of the world view of Marx and Engels". The traditional view of the work as a singular moment of "self-clarification" has been challenged by scholars such as Terrell Carver and Daniel Blank, who argue this narrative is a "scholarly trope" constructed through the work's later editorial and reception history.

The fundamental principle articulated in the book—that "man produces himself through labour"—and the dialectical relationship between human activity and material conditions became a foundational assumption for all of Marx and Engels's subsequent thought, including Das Kapital. The book's critique of idealism, its analysis of the division of labour, and its theory of the state and ruling ideas have remained influential concepts in political theory and social science. The fact that The German Ideology was an unpublished and abandoned project has sometimes been overlooked, leading to its elevation above the works Marx and Engels chose to publish and arguably distorting the understanding of their intellectual development.

Written around the same time as The German Ideology were Marx's "Theses on Feuerbach", which Engels discovered in one of Marx's old notebooks and later published. Engels described them as "the first document in which is deposited the brilliant germ of the new world outlook". Like the "Theses", which famously conclude, "The philosophers have only interpreted the world, in various ways; the point is to change it," The German Ideology represents a decisive turn from pure philosophy toward an analysis of the real world with the aim of its practical transformation.
