= Outlines of a Critique of Political Economy =

1844 article by Friedrich Engels

'Outlines of a Critique of Political Economy' is an article by Friedrich Engels, written in 1843, and first published in German, under the title 'Umrisse zu einer Kritik der Nationalökonomie' in 1844 in the Deutsch–Französische Jahrbücher.

The Deutsch–Französische Jahrbücher (German-French Annals) was a journal, published by Karl Marx and Arnold Ruge in Paris, that had only one issue. In that issue Engels wrote two articles: 'The situation in England' (p. 152-181) and 'Outlines of a Critique of Political Economy' (p. 71-85). Among the other contributors to the Jahrbücher were Heinrich Heine and Karl Marx.

The 'Umrisse', as the article is often called, was first translated into English in 1964 by Martin Milligan, who also translated the Economic and Philosophical Manuscripts of 1844 by Karl Marx.

The article was also translated in other languages, like Italian in 1895, Russian in 1905 and French in 1974.

The article has often been neglected, but played an important role in the development of the marxian critique of political economy.

== Bibliographical information ==
The original German article was published in 1843:

- Engels, Friedrich (1843). "Umrisse zu einer Kritik der Nationalökonomie". Deutsch–Französische Jahrbücher. 1 (1 / 2). – German edition (in German) of the Deutsch-Französische Jahrbücher, on German Wikisource, with (a link to) the German version of the Umrisse.

The English translation by Martin Milligan was first published in 1964 as 'Outlines of a Critique of Political Economy'. It was then published as an Appendix of the Economic and Philosophical Manuscripts of 1844 of Karl Marx.

The English translation was republished several times, for instance (digitally) in 1997 and in 2012.

The 'Umrisse' was published in many translations, for instance:

- In Italian, in 1895.
- In Russian in 1905.
- In French, 1974.

== Background ==
The 'Umrisse' was the first economic text written by Friedrich Engels. It was published in the Deutsch-Französische Jahrbücher in 1844, and "together with the programme articles written by Marx it determined the journal's communist trend." The articles contributed by Marx were: 'Zur Kritik der Hegelschen Rechtsphilosophie' ('Critique of Hegel's Philosophy of Right') and 'Zur Judenfrage' ('On the Jewish Question').

Marx was interested in Engels' 'Umrisse', and wrote a summary of it. Marx has mentioned Engels text several times, for instance in the 'Preface' to A Contribution to the Critique of Political Economy: a "brilliant essay on the critique of economic categories".

== Contents of the article ==
Engels begin the article by claiming that "Political economy came into being as a natural result of the expansion of trade, and with its appearance elementary, unscientific huckstering was replaced by a developed system of licensed fraud, an entire science of enrichment". Engels then goes on to critique and tell the history of the making of the mercantile system as a system to gain competitive advantage. Mercantilism claimed that there was a need to always make sure that one had to export more than import. This led to that "The art of the economists [...] consisted in ensuring that [...] exports should show a favourable balance over imports; and for the sake of this ridiculous illusion thousands of men have been slaughtered!"

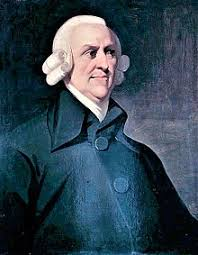
Adam Smith - the economic Luther, according to Friedrich Engels

After this Engels pointed out that while the eighteenth century revolutionized economics, it only did so partly. This movement didn't get rid of the Christian contempt for and humiliation of Man, but rather postited nature as the Absolute which confronted Man. Thereafter he declared that politicians haven't examined the premises of the state, and that it didn't occur to economics to question the very validity of private property. The new economy was hence obliged to disavow its own premises and recourse to hypocrisy. The premises of the economy begot the modern slavery and factory system. Engels viewed Smith's new system as a necessary advance, but also claimed that "The nearer the economists come to the present time, the further they depart from honesty." Engels then goes on to critique the concept of "national wealth", as well as "national economy"(Nationalökonomie, today "economics").Engels further explains how the immediate consequence of private property is trade - which due to the fact that every actor in this activity must aim to dupe the other, legalized fraud.

The mercantile system is viewed by Engels as an expression of the mutual hostility, which were the logical consequence of trade. It was not until the extorted trade treaties, commercial wars, and isolation of the nations offended to greatly that Smith's humanity, which was rooted in the expansion of mutual trade. However this was merely friendly endeavors for the sake of the profit margin, a principle immanent in the very nature of trade. This hypocritical way of misusing morality for immoral purposes is the pride of the free-trade system according to Engels.

“Have we not overthrown the barbarism of the monopolies?” exclaim the hypocrites. “Have we not carried civilisation to distant parts of the world? Have we not brought about the fraternisation of the peoples, and reduced the number of wars?” Yes, all this you have done – but how! You have destroyed the small monopolies so that the one great basic monopoly, property, may function the more freely and unrestrictedly. You have civilised the ends of the earth to win new terrain for the deployment of your vile avarice. You have brought about the fraternisation of the peoples – but the fraternity is the fraternity of thieves. You have reduced the number of wars – to earn all the bigger profits in peace, to intensify to the utmost the enmity between individuals, the ignominious war of competition! When have you done anything out of pure humanity, from consciousness of the futility of the opposition between the general and the individual interest? When have you been moral without being interested, without harbouring at the back of your mind immoral, egoistical motives?

— Friedrich Engels, Outlines of a Critique of Political Economy, Deutsch-Französische Jahrbücher, 1843

The liberal economic system transformed mankind into "a horde of ravenous beasts" which aim to devour each other, what remained for the economy after this was merely to dissolve the family. Here the factory system came to its aid. Once the system and its principles is in motion, it works by a logic on its own, with all its consequences, whether the economists like it or not.

Engels goes on to claim that the economists doesn't know what interests they serve.

Engels then goes on to examine the category of value which is established by trade. He critiques economists yet again by arguing that:

The economist[s] who lives by antitheses has also of course a double value – abstract or real value and exchange-value. There was a protracted quarrel over the nature of real value between the English, who defined the costs of production as the expression of real value, and the Frenchman Say, who claimed to measure this value by the utility of an object. The quarrel hung in doubt from the beginning of the century, then became dormant without a decision having been reached. The economists cannot decide anything.

— Friedrich Engels, Outlines of a Critique of Political Economy, Deutsch-Französische Jahrbücher, 1843

He then goes on by giving examples of this citing e.g. Say, and claiming the unsustainable and self contradictory nature of economic abstractions, nonentities.

To strengthen his argument, Engels goes on with a steel man argument, by supposing that the economist is correct, but ends up rejecting the steelmanned argument due to his claim that it there becomes even more evident how unsubstantiated the economists claims really are.

Engels touches upon how the economists claim to be able to decide the utility of objects. And there writes "The mere opinion of the parties concerned?", this statement is clearly meant to be absurd, especially when one reads the following sentence which reads "

"Then in any event one will be cheated." (The interested reader may note that this subjectivist position is the basis for contemporary value theory in neoclassical (orthodox) economics.)

Further it is claimed that the so-called equivalent relationships in trade, is exactly not that, Engels goes on to claim that "[...]everything in economics stands on its head".

He then explains how we deal with two fundamental elements of production – nature and man, which he then contrasts to the position of those who claimed inherent value to property, while Engels argues that property in itself is worthless in economic categories, since one must have a wholly asociological understanding of exchange if one wants to argue for the inherent value of it. The monopolization and leasing of the land where productive activity takes place is axiomatic. This is what increases the material wealth of the big landowners. Engels claims that no one shall reap where he has not sown, and hence consider this practice equivalent to robbery.

To make land an object of huckstering – the land which is our one and all, the first condition of our existence – was the last step towards making oneself an object of huckstering.

— Friedrich Engels, Outlines of a Critique of Political Economy, Deutsch-Französische Jahrbücher, 1843

Engels claims that while capital and labour are initially identical, splits and divisions stem from the original separation of capital from labour divides mankind into capitalists and workers – a division which becomes ever more acute. Separations also occur such as the original capital and profit, and profit is split into interest and profit proper.

In order from concrete to abstract, land < labour < capital.

The difference between interest and profit disappears; capital is nothing without labour, without movement.

— Friedrich Engels, Outlines of a Critique of Political Economy, Deutsch-Französische Jahrbücher, 1843

He then remarked that if the so-called private property, is done away with, these this unnatural separations (specific to the mode of production) also disappears.

To summarize the presentation so far Engels concludes that everything comes down to competition in the capitalist mode of production. Which is the economist's principal category according to him. Or as he expresses it "his most beloved daughter, whom he ceaselessly caresses – and look out for the Medusa's head which she will show you!"

Human activity was dissolved into the categories of capital and its reproducing category of labour, which is in turn reproduced by the socially reproduced conditions of private property, where mutual aid doesn't rule, but antagonism.

However, Engels then goes on to address monopoly once more, which was the motto of the mercantile economists. In contrast to the liberal economists. Engels briefly states that "It is easy to see that this antithesis is again a quite hollow antithesis." Due to the fact that competition breeds monopoly. Competition even presupposes monopoly, the monopoly of property.

He then claims that if people would take up production consciously as human beings - and not as atoms without consciousness, these artificial antitheses would be overcome.

Since this hasn't happened yet, each crisis will become worse. Which will increase the numbers of human being which live by selling their labour alone. Which will create conditions ripe for social movements.

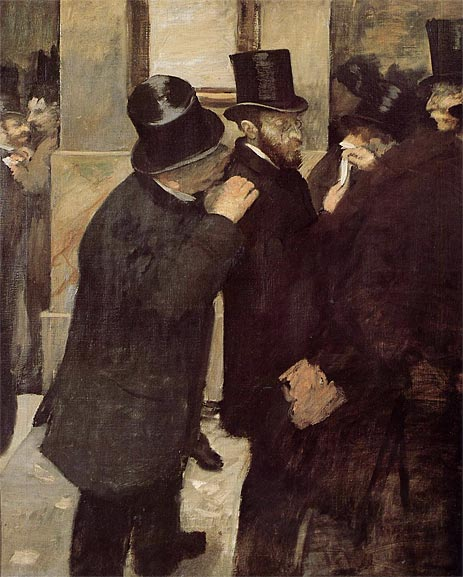
At The Stock Exchange - painting by Edgar Degas

He then goes on to claim that if this continues, everyone will have to become a speculator, enriching themselves in a calculated matter at the expense of her fellow human beings. The immorality of speculation will even see natural disasters etc. as an "investment opportunity". The culmination of this is the stock exchange, where mankind and history is demoted to a means to an end, by the gambling speculator. The truth of the relation of competition is rather in Engels view the relation of consumption to productivity. Which would be the only competition in a world which was worthy of mankind.

Here Engels invites the readers to consult the writing of the English socialists of his time, to acquaint oneself with how a community could establish a rational condition for production and consumption.

He then once again goes on to explain the nature of societal competition in claiming that "No one at all who enters into the struggle of competition can whether it without the utmost exertion of his energy, without renouncing every truly human purpose." The economists could not afford to realize that competition brought about these mad contradictions since their system would fall apart if something was to happen to it. Hence, population theory was invented. Engels then goes on to criticize Malthus incorrect population theory, and continues by claiming that the tendency to monopoly has been shown in practice, and will continue to increase due to the nature of the competition in the mode of production. Therefore "free competition" which was the dogma of economists even in Engels day, was and remains impossible as argued by Engels. Monopoly can't be done away with, and even if it could be done away with, "free competition" breeds more monopoly anyway. Therefore, those issues most be solved through the transcendence of the principle(s) which gave rise to them.

Further Engels remarked that "Competition has penetrated all the relationships of our life and completed the reciprocal bondage in which men now hold themselves." Claiming that "Competition is the great mainspring which again and again jerks into activity our aging and withering social order, or rather disorder; but with each new exertion it also saps a part of this order's waning strength." A rather sociological reflection on crime then follows, where Engels posits that a society in which the principles of supply competition and demand are holy principles, will have demand for crime, and hence a corresponding supply. An argument that is backed up by the everywhere increasing crime statistics everywhere around the factories. He leaves to the readers how to punish criminals under those circumstances, since he was more "concerned [with] demonstrating the extension of competition into the moral sphere, and in showing to what deep degradation private property has brought man."

Finishing of, Engels touches on issues of machinery and the factory system, which has some similarity to Marx fragment on machines.
