= Judeo-communism =

Judeo-communism may refer to two antisemitic canards:

- Jewish Bolshevism (Russia)
- Żydokomuna (Poland)

== See also ==
- Marxism and religion § Communism and Judaism
