= On the Jewish Question =

Essay by Karl Marx

"On the Jewish Question" is a response by Karl Marx to then-current debates over the Jewish question. Marx's father had converted to Lutheran Christianity, and his wife and children were baptized in 1825 and 1824, respectively. Marx wrote the piece in 1843, and it was first published in Paris in 1844 under the German title "Zur Judenfrage" in the Deutsch–Französische Jahrbücher.

The essay criticizes two studies by Marx's fellow Young Hegelian, Bruno Bauer, on the attempt by Jews to achieve political emancipation in Prussia. Bauer argued that Jews could achieve political emancipation only by relinquishing their particular religious consciousness since political emancipation requires a secular state; Bauer assumes that there is not any "space" remaining for social identities such as religion. According to Bauer, such religious demands are incompatible with the idea of the "Rights of Man". True political emancipation, for Bauer, requires the abolition of religion.

Marx uses Bauer's essay as an opportunity for presenting his own analysis of liberal rights, arguing that Bauer is mistaken in his assumption that in a "secular state", religion will no longer play a prominent role in social life. Marx gives the pervasiveness of religion in the United States as an example, which, unlike Prussia, had no state religion. In Marx's analysis, the "secular state" is not opposed to religion, but rather actually presupposes it. The removal of religious or property qualifications for citizens does not mean the abolition of religion or property, but only introduces a way of regarding individuals in abstraction from them.

Marx then moves beyond the question of religious freedom to his real concern with Bauer's analysis of "political emancipation". Marx concludes that while individuals can be "spiritually" and "politically" free in a secular state, they can still be bound to material constraints on freedom by economic inequality, an assumption that would later form the basis of his critiques of capitalism.

The essay and Marx's alleged history of antisemitic behavior has led to criticism of Marx as well as Marxism. However, many Marxists, and scholars otherwise interested in Marxism, disagree that the essay or his letters are antisemitic.

== Synopsis of content ==
In Marx's view, Bauer fails to distinguish between political emancipation and human emancipation. As noted above, political emancipation in a modern state does not require Jews (or Christians) to renounce religion; only complete human emancipation would involve the disappearance of religion, but that is not yet possible "within the hitherto existing world order".

In the second part of the essay, Marx disputes Bauer's "theological" analysis of Judaism and its relation to Christianity. Bauer states that the renouncing of religion would be especially difficult for Jews. In Bauer's view, Judaism was a primitive stage in the development of Christianity. Hence, to achieve freedom by renouncing religion, Christians would have to surmount only one stage, whereas Jews would need to surmount two.

In response to this, Marx argues that the Jewish religion does not have the significance Bauer's analysis attributes, because it is merely a spiritual reflection of Jewish economic life. This is the starting point of a complex and somewhat metaphorical argument that draws on the stereotype of "the Jew" as a financially apt "huckster" and posits a special connection between Judaism as a religion and the economy of contemporary bourgeois society. Thus, the Jewish religion does not need to disappear in society, as Bauer argues, because it is actually a natural part of it. Having thus figuratively equated "practical Judaism" with "huckstering and money", Marx concludes, that "the Christians have become Jews"; and, ultimately, it is mankind (both Christians and Jews) that needs to emancipate itself from ("practical") Judaism.

== History of publication ==
"Zur Judenfrage" was first published by Marx and Arnold Ruge in February 1844 in the Deutsch–Französische Jahrbücher, a journal which ran only one issue. From December 1843 to October 1844, Bruno Bauer published the monthly Allgemeine Literatur-Zeitung (General Literary Gazette) in Charlottenburg (now part of Berlin). In it, he responded to the critique of his own essays on the Jewish question by Marx and others. Then, in 1845, Friedrich Engels and Marx published a polemic critique of the Young Hegelians titled The Holy Family. In parts of the book, Marx again presented his views dissenting from Bauer's on the Jewish question and on political and human emancipation.

A French translation appeared 1850 in Paris in Hermann Ewerbeck's book Qu'est-ce que la bible d'après la nouvelle philosophie allemande? (What is the Bible according to the new German philosophy?).

In 1879, historian Heinrich von Treitschke published an article "Unsere Aussichten" ("Our Prospects"), in which he demanded that the Jews should assimilate into German culture, and described Jewish immigrants as a danger for Germany. This article stirred up controversy, to which the newspaper Sozialdemokrat, edited by Eduard Bernstein, reacted by republishing almost the entire second part of "Zur Judenfrage" in June and July 1881.

The entire essay was re-published yet again in October 1890 in the Berliner Volksblatt, then edited by Wilhelm Liebknecht.

In 1926, an English translation by H. J. Stenning, with the title "On the Jewish Question", appeared in a collection of essays by Marx.

Another English translation of "Zur Judenfrage" was published (along with other articles written by Marx) in 1959, and titled, A World Without Jews. The editor, Dagobert D. Runes, intended to demonstrate Marx's alleged antisemitism. Runes' text was extensively criticized by Louis Harap for grossly misrepresenting Marx's views.

== Interpretations ==
In Abraham Leon's 1946 book The Jewish Question, Leon examines Jewish history from a materialist perspective. According to Leon, Marx's essay uses the framing that one "must not start with religion in order to explain Jewish history; on the contrary: the preservation of the Jewish religion or nationality can be explained only by the 'real Jew', that is to say, by the Jew in his economic and social role".

Isaac Deutscher (1959) compares Marx with Elisha ben Abuyah, Baruch Spinoza, Heinrich Heine, Rosa Luxemburg, Leon Trotsky, and Sigmund Freud, all of whom he thinks of as heretics who repudiate Jewry, yet still belong to a Jewish tradition. According to Deutscher, Marx's "idea of socialism and of the classless and stateless society" expressed in the essay is as universal as Spinoza's "Ethics and God".

Shlomo Avineri (1964), while acknowledging Marx's antisemitism as fact, also argues that Marx's philosophical criticism of Judaism overshadows his support for Jewish emancipation as an immediate political goal. Avineri notes that in Bauer's debates with a number of Jewish contemporary polemicists, Marx entirely endorsed the views of the Jewish writers against Bauer. In a letter to Arnold Ruge, written March 1843, Marx writes that he intended to support a petition of the Jews to the Provincial Assembly. He explains that while he dislikes Judaism as a religion, he also remains unconvinced by Bauer's view (that Jews should not be emancipated unless they abandon Judaism). However, he also clarifies in the letter that his support of the petition is merely tactical, to further his efforts at weakening the Christian state.

In his 1965 book For Marx, Louis Althusser say that "in On the Jewish Question, Hegel's Philosophy of the State, etc., and even usually in The Holy Family that "... Marx was merely applying the theory of alienation, that is, Feuerbach's theory of 'human nature', to politics and the concrete activity of man, before extending it (in large part) to political economy in the Manuscripts". He opposes a tendency according to which "Capital is no longer read as 'On the Jewish Question', 'On the Jewish Question' is read as 'Capital'". For Althusser, the essay "is a profoundly "ideological text", "committed to the struggle for Communism", but without being Marxist; "so it cannot, theoretically, be identified with the later texts which were to define historical materialism".

David Nirenberg sees Marx as having used anti-Judaism as a theoretical framework for making sense of the world and critically engaging with it. He argues that by framing his revolutionary economic and political project as a liberation of the world from Judaism, Marx expressed a "messianic desire" that was itself "quite Christian." In 2022, he specified in a K. interview that, in doing so, Marx perpetuated a more radicalized externally conceived Judaism than that of "slavery to the law, to forms, to rites", when "he affirm[ed] that the West, insofar as it utilized money and private property, produces Judaism 'from its own entrails'".

However, David McLellan argued that "On the Jewish Question" must be understood in terms of Marx's debates with Bruno Bauer over the nature of political emancipation in Germany. According to McLellan, Marx used the word "Judentum" in its colloquial sense of "commerce" to argue that Germans suffer, and must be emancipated from, capitalism. The second half of Marx's essay, McLellan concludes, should be read as "an extended pun at Bauer's expense". (Note: This view that by Judentum "Jewry ~ Jewishness ~ Judaism" Marx colloquially meant "commerce" is also shared by other Marxists outsides the English-speaking world. For example, this prepositional phrase from Marx's Theses on Feuerbach, in original German in ihrer schmutzig-jüdischen Erscheinungsform, is translated by USSR Marxist translators into Russian as в грязно-торгашеской форме ее проявления (rough English translation: "in its dirty-hucksterish form of appearance"). Even so, that view is not universal; for example, some Vietnamese Marxist translators translate that same phrase into Vietnamese as dưới hình thức biểu hiện con buôn - bẩn thỉu của nó mà thôi (rough English translation: "in its dirty-hucksterish form of appearance") yet others translate it literally into Vietnamese as trong hình thức biểu hiện Do Thái bẩn thỉu của nó mà thôi (English translation: "in its dirty-Jewish form of appearance").)

Stephen Greenblatt (1978) compares the essay with Christopher Marlowe's play The Jew of Malta. According to Greenblatt, "[b]oth writers hope to focus attention upon activity that is seen as at once alien and yet central to the life of the community and to direct against that activity the antisemitic feeling of the audience". Greenblatt attributes to Marx a "sharp, even hysterical, denial of his religious background".

Feminist Wendy Brown argues that "On the Jewish Question" is primarily a critique of liberal rights, rather than a criticism of Judaism, and that apparently antisemitic passages such as "Money is the jealous god of Israel, in face of which no other god may exist" should be read in that context.

Yoav Peled (1992) sees Marx "shifting the debate over Jewish emancipation from the plane of theology... to the plane of sociology", thereby circumventing one of Bauer's main arguments. In Peled's view, "this was less than a satisfactory response to Bauer, but it enabled Marx to present a powerful case for emancipation while, at the same time, launching his critique of economic alienation". He concludes that "the philosophical advances made by Marx in 'On the Jewish Question' were necessitated by, and integrally related to, his commitment to Jewish emancipation".

Francis Wheen says: "Those critics, who see this as a foretaste of 'Mein Kampf', overlook one, essential point: in spite of the clumsy phraseology and crude stereotyping, the essay was actually written as a defense of the Jews. It was a retort to Bruno Bauer, who had argued that Jews should not be granted full civic rights and freedoms unless they were baptised as Christians". Although he claimed to be an atheist, Bruno Bauer viewed Judaism as an inferior religion.

The political-scientist Professor Iain Hampsher-Monk wrote in his textbook: "This work ["On The Jewish Question"] has been cited as evidence for Marx's supposed antisemitism, but only the most superficial reading of it could sustain such an interpretation."

In part II of the essay, Marx refers to Thomas Müntzer's 1524 pamphlet, Apology, attacking Martin Luther. Müntzer wrote, "Look ye! Our sovereign and rulers are at the bottom of all usury, thievery, and robbery; they take all created things into possession. The fish in the water, birds in the air, the products of the soil – all must be theirs (Isaiah v.)". Marx's appreciation of Müntzer's position has been interpreted as a sympathetic view of Marx towards animals. It is also possible that Müntzer was referring to the temerity of sovereign rulers who would take even that which God had created (for all of mankind and the world) as their own.

=== Perceived antisemitism ===
In his 1984 article "Marxism vs. the Jews" for Commentary, English journalist Paul Johnson references the second part of Marx's essay as evidence of Marx's antisemitism:

Let us consider the actual, worldly Jew – not the Sabbath Jew, as Bauer does, but the everyday Jew. Let us not look for the secret of the Jew in his religion, but let us look for the secret of his religion in the real Jew. What is the secular basis of Judaism? Practical need, self-interest. What is the worldly religion of the Jew? Huckstering. What is his worldly God? Money[...] An organization of society which would abolish the preconditions for huckstering, and therefore the possibility of huckstering, would make the Jew impossible[...] The Jew has emancipated himself in a Jewish manner, not only because he has acquired financial power, but also because, through him and also apart from him, money has become a world power and the practical Jewish spirit has become the practical spirit of the Christian nations. The Jews have emancipated themselves insofar as the Christians have become Jews[...] Money is the jealous god of Israel, in face of which no other god may exist. Money degrades all the gods of man – and turns them into commodities[...] The bill of exchange is the real god of the Jew. His god is only an illusory bill of exchange[...] The chimerical nationality of the Jew is the nationality of the merchant, of the man of money in general.

Antisemitism scholar Robert S. Wistrich stated "the net result of Marx's essay is to reinforce a traditional anti-Jewish stereotype – the identification of the Jews with money-making – in the sharpest possible manner". Bernard Lewis described "On the Jewish Question" as "one of the classics of antisemitic propaganda".

Hal Draper (1977) observed that the language of Part II of "On the Jewish Question" followed the view of the Jews' role given in Jewish socialist Moses Hess's essay "On the Money System". According to Edward Flannery, Marx considered Jews to be enthusiastic capitalists.

Hyam Maccoby argued that "On the Jewish Question" is an example of what he considers to be Marx's "early antisemitism". According to Maccoby, Marx argues in the essay that the modern commercialized world is the triumph of Judaism, a pseudo-religion whose god is money. Maccoby suggested that Marx was embarrassed by his Jewish background and used Jews as a "yardstick of evil". Maccoby writes that in later years, Marx limited what he considers to be antipathy towards Jews to private letters and conversations because of strong public identification with antisemitism by his political enemies both on the left (Pierre-Joseph Proudhon and Mikhail Bakunin) and on the right (aristocracy and the Church).

For sociologist Robert Fine (2006) Bauer's essay "echoed the generally prejudicial representation of the Jew as 'merchant' and 'moneyman'", whereas "Marx's aim was to defend the right of Jews to full civil and political emancipation (that is, to equal civil and political rights) alongside all other German citizens". Fine argues that "[the] line of attack Marx adopts is not to contrast Bauer's crude stereotype of the Jews to the actual situation of Jews in Germany", but "to reveal that Bauer has no inkling of the nature of modern democracy". Sociologist Larry Ray in his reply (2006) to Fine acknowledges Fine's reading of the essay as an ironic defense of Jewish emancipation. He points out the ambiguity of Marx's language. Ray translates a sentence of "Zur Judenfrage" and interprets it as an assimilationist position "in which there is no room within emancipated humanity for Jews as a separate ethnic or cultural identity", and which advocates "a society where both cultural as well as economic difference is eliminated". Here Ray sees Marx in a "strand of left thinking that has been unable to address forms of oppression not directly linked to class".

== See also ==
- Antisemitism in Europe
- Dialectical materialism
- German idealism
- History of antisemitism
- Marxism and religion
- Marxist philosophy
- Self-hating Jew
