= Opium of the people =

Metaphorical expression for religion

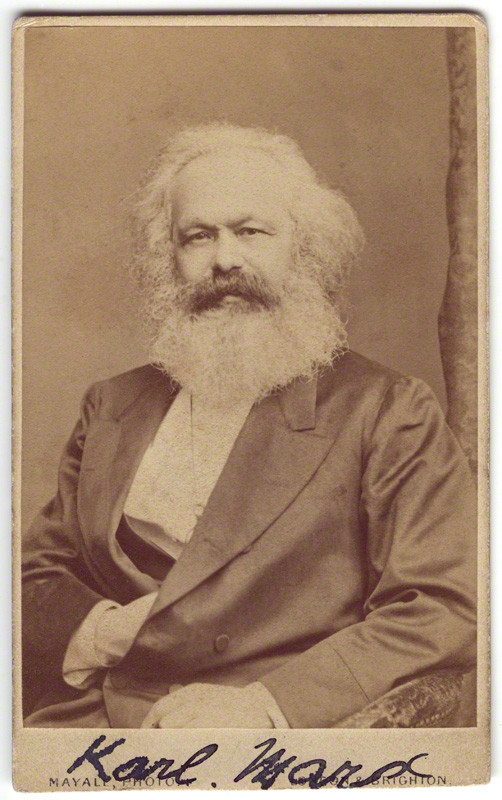
Karl Marx

"Opium of the people" or "opium of the masses" (German: Opium des Volkes) is a dictum used in reference to religion, derived from a frequently paraphrased partial statement of German revolutionary and critic of political economy Karl Marx: "Religion is the opium of the people." In context, the statement is part of Marx's analysis that religion's role is as a metaphysical balm for the real suffering in the universe and in society.

This statement was translated from the German original, "Die Religion [...] ist das Opium des Volkes" and is often rendered as "religion [...] is the opiate of the masses." The passage from Marx translates (including italics) as: "Religion is the sigh of the oppressed creature, the heart of a heartless world, and the soul of soulless conditions. It is the opium of the people."

The passage occurs in an article published in February 1844, in Marx's own journal Deutsch–Französische Jahrbücher, a collaboration with Arnold Ruge. The article was the introduction to a book-length work, A Contribution to the Critique of Hegel's Philosophy of Right, begun in 1843 (the year following the conclusion of the first imperialist Opium War in south China) but not published until after Marx's death. While the sentence (really bits of two sentences, mushed together) is often quoted, its context has received much less attention.

== Full quotation and history ==
Marx wrote this passage in 1843 as part of the introduction to Critique of Hegel's Philosophy of Right, a book that criticized philosopher Georg Wilhelm Friedrich Hegel's 1820 book, Elements of the Philosophy of Right. This introduction was published in 1844 in a small journal called Deutsch–Französische Jahrbücher; however, the book itself was published posthumously. As the journal had a print run of just 1,000 copies, it had no popular effect during the 19th century. The phrase became better known during the 1930s, when Marxism became more popular.

The quotation, in context, reads as follows (italics in original):

The foundation of irreligious criticism is: Man makes religion, religion does not make man. Religion is, indeed, the self-consciousness and self-esteem of man who has either not yet won through to himself, or has already lost himself again. But man is no abstract being squatting outside the world. Man is the world of man – state, society. This state and this society produce religion, which is an inverted consciousness of the world, because they are an inverted world. Religion is the general theory of this world, its encyclopaedic compendium, its logic in popular form, its spiritual point d'honneur, its enthusiasm, its moral sanction, its solemn complement, and its universal basis of consolation and justification. It is the fantastic realization of the human essence since the human essence has not acquired any true reality. The struggle against religion is, therefore, indirectly the struggle against that world whose spiritual aroma is religion.

Religious suffering is, at one and the same time, the expression of real suffering and a protest against real suffering. Religion is the sigh of the oppressed creature, the heart of a heartless world, and the soul of soulless conditions. It is the opium of the people.

The abolition of religion as the illusory happiness of the people is the demand for their real happiness. To call on them to give up their illusions about their condition is to call on them to give up a condition that requires illusions. The criticism of religion is, therefore, in embryo, the criticism of that vale of tears of which religion is the halo.

== Metaphor ==
Marx used the phrase to make a structural-functionalist argument about religion, and particularly about organized religion. In his view, religion, although false, is a function of something real. Specifically, Marx believed that religion had certain practical functions in society that were similar to the function of opium in a sick or injured person: it reduced people's immediate suffering and provided them with pleasant illusions which gave them the strength to carry on. In this sense, while Marx had no sympathy for religion itself, he has deep sympathy for those proletariat who put their trust in it.

At the same time, Marx saw religion as harmful to revolutionary goals: by focusing on the eternal rather than the temporal, religion turns the attention of the oppressed away from the exploitation and class structure that encompasses their everyday lives. In the process, religion helps to foster a kind of false consciousness that emboldens cultural values and beliefs that support and validate the continued dominance of the ruling class. It thereby prevents the socialist revolution, the overthrowing of capitalism, and the establishment of a classless, socialist society. In Marx's view, once workers finally overthrow capitalism, unequal social relations will no longer need legitimating and people's alienation will dissolve, along with any need for religion.

=== Interpretations by subsequent communist leaders and theorists ===
Subsequent communist leaders and theorists have reflected and expanded on Marx's metaphor and considered it in the context of their own national conditions.

==== Vladimir Lenin ====
Vladimir Lenin, speaking of religion in Novaya Zhizn in 1905, alluded to Marx's earlier comments:

Those who toil and live in want all their lives are taught by religion to be submissive and patient while here on earth, and to take comfort in the hope of a heavenly reward. But those who live by the labour of others are taught by religion to practise charity while on earth, thus offering them a very cheap way of justifying their entire existence as exploiters and selling them at a moderate price tickets to well-being in heaven. Religion is opium of the people [opium naroda]. Religion is a sort of spiritual booze, in which the slaves of capital drown their human image [obraz], their demand for a life more or less worthy of man.

==== Kim Il Sung ====
North Korean leader Kim Il Sung's writings addressed the "opium" metaphor twice, both in the context of responding to comrades who object to working with religious groups (Chonbulygo and Chondoism). In the first instance, Kim replies that a person is "mistaken" if they believe Marx's proposition regarding "opium of the people" can be applied in all instances, explaining that if a religion "prays for dealing out divine punishment to Japan and blessing the Korean nation" then it is a "patriotic religion" and its believers are patriots. In the second, Kim states that Marx's metaphor "must not be construed radically and unilaterally" because Marx was warning against "the temptation of a religious mirage and not opposing believers in general." Because the communist movement in Korea was fighting a struggle for "national salvation" against Japan, Kim writes that anyone with a similar agenda can join the struggle and that "even a religionist [...] must be enrolled in our ranks without hesitation."

=== Academic interpretations ===
Roland Boer argues that Marx's depiction of religion as opium has been largely misinterpreted, and that at that time opium was both valued and denounced for its medicinal qualities and its addictive potential.

In other academic work, Robin Dunbar has used the idea of religion being "the opium of the people" to suggest that group religious practice may lead to the body's natural release of endogenous opioids, known as endorphins. Multiple studies have been conducted attempting to test this hypothesis. In one such series of studies, Sarah Charles found evidence that religious ritual did lead to the release of endogenous opioids, which was directly linked to participants' feelings of bonding during the group religious practice.

=== Similar statements and influence ===
The same metaphor was used by many authors around the 19th century.

In 1798, Novalis wrote in Blüthenstaub ('Pollen'):

Ihre sogenannte Religion wirkt bloß wie ein Opiat reizend, betäubend, Schmerzen aus Schwäche stillend. [Their so-called religion works simply as an opiate—stimulating; numbing; quelling pain by means of weakness.]

In 1840, Heinrich Heine also used the same analogy, in his essay on Ludwig Börne:

Welcome be a religion that pours into the bitter chalice of the suffering human species some sweet, soporific drops of spiritual opium, some drops of love, hope and faith.

The writings of Bruno Bauer are a key influence on the Critique of Hegel's Philosophy of Right. Marx's metaphor is anticipated in two of Bauer's works: Die gute Sache der Freiheit and Der christliche Staat. In the former work, Bauer talks of religion as a cause of "opium-like stupefaction;" in the latter, Bauer mentions theology's "opium-like" influence.

Charles Kingsley, a canon of the Church of England, wrote the following in 1847, four years after Marx:

We have used the Bible as if it were a mere special constable's hand book, an opium dose for keeping beasts of burden patient while they were being overloaded, a mere book to keep the poor in order.

==== Miguel de Unamuno ====
Miguel de Unamuno, the Spanish author of the Generation of '98, focused his nivola San Manuel Bueno, mártir around the theme of religion's opiatic effect on the people of rural Spain. In the book, the protagonist Don Manuel is a priest who does not believe in God, but continues preaching because he sees the positive impact he can make in the lives of his parishioners. Religion in this way also serves to cure his own deep depression, through the happiness he feels from helping the people of Valverde de Lucerna. Unamuno makes direct reference to Marx when Don Manuel explains:

Yes, I know that one of the leaders of what they call the social revolution has said that religion is the opium of the people. Opium ... opium, yes! Let's give them opium, and let them sleep and dream. And with this crazy activity of mine, I have also been using opium.

=== Modern comparisons ===
Some writers make a modern comparison of the phrase "opium of the people" to that akin to sports fandom, celebrities, the distractions of television, the internet, and other entertainment, etc. This can be seen as a parallel to the concept of bread and circuses.

In 2016 in the Atlantic and on the PBS show hosted by Charlie Rose, prior to being elected senator or nominated to be Donald Trump's running mate, JD Vance called Trump "cultural heroin" and "an opioid of the masses."

== See also ==
- Criticism of religion
  - Antireligion
- Faith and rationality
- God helps those who help themselves
- Marxism and religion
  - Marxist–Leninist atheism
- Noble lie
- The Opium of the Intellectuals
