= Moses Hess =

German-Jewish philosopher and socialist (1812–1875)

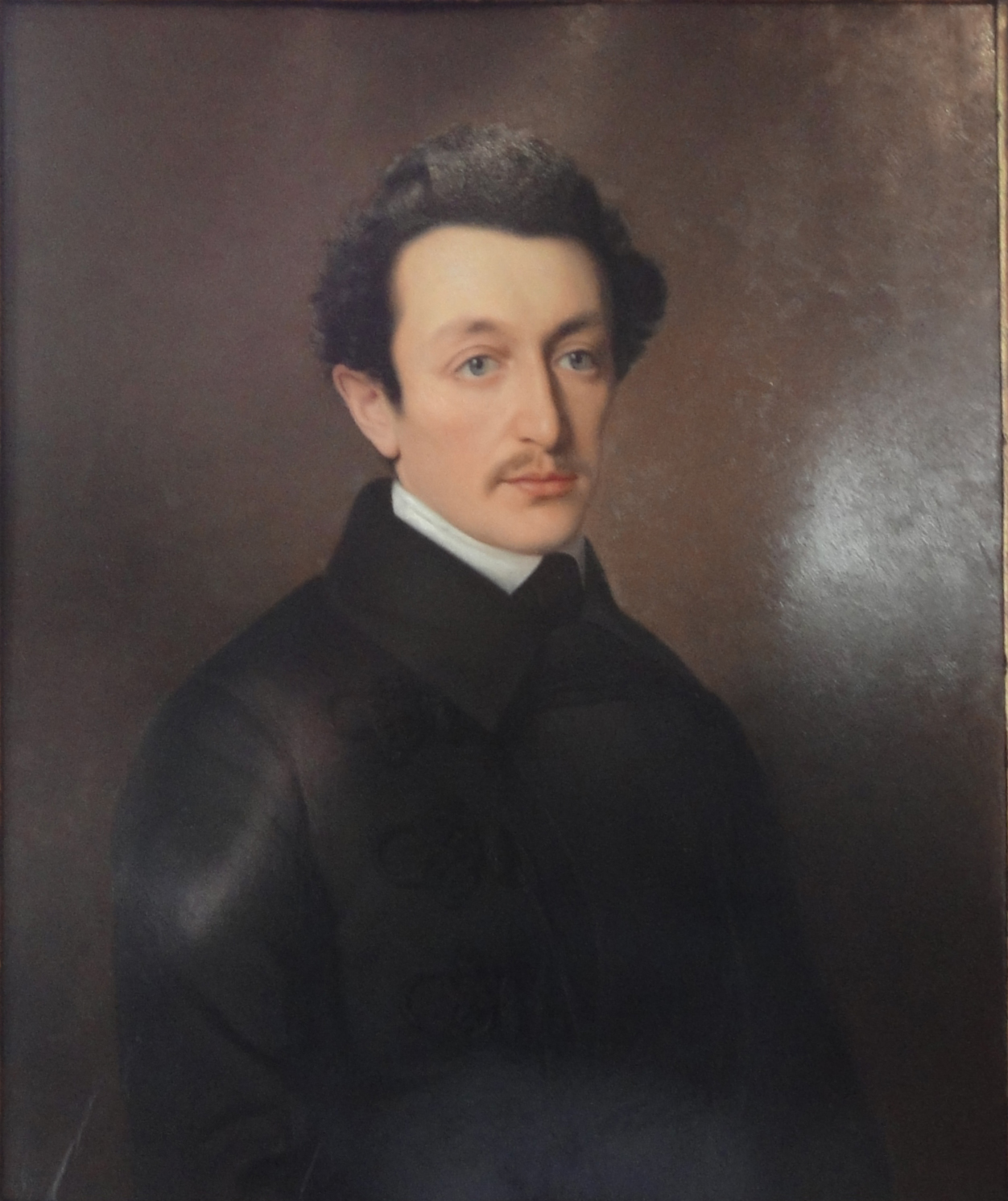
- Portrait by Gustav Adolf Koettgen, 1846
- Born: 21 January 1812; Bonn, France
- Died: 6 April 1875 (aged 63); Paris, France
- Resting place: Kinneret Cemetery, Israel
- Spouse: Sibylle Pesch

Education
- Education: University of Bonn

Philosophical work
- School: Young Hegelians; Socialism; Zionism
- Main interests: Political philosophy
- Notable works: Rome and Jerusalem: The Last National Question
- Notable ideas: Labor Zionism

Moses Hess (21 January 1812 – 6 April 1875) was a German-Jewish philosopher, a writer on socialism, and in later life, a forerunner of the political movement that became known as Zionism. His intellectual journey included significant contributions to the early development of socialist theory, and he was a close collaborator and an important influence on Karl Marx and Friedrich Engels. In his later life, Hess's focus shifted towards Jewish nationalism, culminating in his seminal 1862 work, Rome and Jerusalem.

Born in the French-occupied Rhineland, Hess was raised in a traditional Jewish home but broke away in his youth to pursue a path of philosophy and radical politics. His first book, The Holy History of Mankind (1837), proposed a socialist society founded on a synthesis of Jewish and Christian ethics, mediated through the philosophy of Baruch Spinoza. In the 1840s, he became a central figure among the Young Hegelians, where he developed a theory of "ethical socialism" and was one of the first thinkers in the German tradition to articulate a sophisticated theory of alienation rooted in social and economic conditions.

After the failure of the Revolutions of 1848, Hess grew disillusioned with the prospects of Jewish integration in Europe. Witnessing the rise of German nationalism and modern antisemitism, he concluded that the Jewish people were a distinct nation, not merely a religious community, and that their existential problems could only be solved through a national revival in their ancestral homeland. Rome and Jerusalem advocated for the establishment of a socialist commonwealth in Palestine, making him a foundational figure of Labor Zionism.

Hess died in Paris in 1875 and was buried in the Jewish cemetery in Deutz, Cologne. In 1961, his remains were transferred to Israel and reinterred in the Kinneret Cemetery. His work represents a unique synthesis of the national and social questions of the 19th century, and he remains a significant, though often overlooked, figure in the histories of both socialism and Zionism.

== Early life and education ==
Moses Hess was born on 21 January 1812 in Bonn, which was then under French rule, into a family whose ancestors may have come from Poland. The Rhineland had been transformed by the French Revolution, which introduced legal equality, abolished feudal privileges, and fully emancipated the Jewish population. This new era of freedom was short-lived; after Napoleon's defeat in 1814, the region was granted to the Kingdom of Prussia, which rescinded the rights Jews had acquired under the French. This reversal created a profound sense of trauma and dislocation among Rhenish Jews, who, after tasting freedom, were pushed back into a state of civic inequality. While some, like Heinrich Heine and Karl Marx's father, converted to Christianity to regain their status, Hess's family reacted by becoming more fiercely attached to their traditional religion. This experience shaped a generation of radical Jewish thinkers from the region.

Hess came from a family with rabbinical ancestors on both sides. His father, a businessman, moved the family to the more commercially vibrant city of Cologne in 1816 to set up a sugar refinery, but left the five-year-old Moses in Bonn to be raised by his devoutly religious maternal grandfather. Cologne's Jewish community was small and lacked educational infrastructure, so Hess remained in Bonn to receive a traditional Jewish religious education in the Bible and Talmud under the guidance of his grandfather, whom Hess later recalled as an "extremely orthodox" and learned man. In a diary entry from 1836, however, Hess recalled his formal teachers with anguish, calling them "inhuman beings" (Unmenschen).

In the Jewish Quarter [Judengasse] was I born and educated; until my fifteenth year, they tried to beat the Talmud into me. My teachers were inhuman beings [Unmenschen], my colleagues were bad company, inducing me to secret sins; my body was frail, my spirit raw.

After his mother's death in 1826, Hess joined his father in Cologne and was expected to enter the family business. The move to a larger, more cosmopolitan city made him painfully aware of his limited, ghetto-based education. He rebelled against both his father's commercial world and the prospect of a rabbinic career, choosing instead to pursue a life of letters. He quarreled with his father and, in 1833, left home with a small sum of money, travelling to Holland and France, where he experienced poverty and first encountered socialist ideas. Lacking a formal secular education, he embarked on an intensive program of self-study, reading voraciously in German philosophy—including Immanuel Kant, Friedrich Wilhelm Joseph Schelling, and Georg Wilhelm Friedrich Hegel—and French thinkers like Jean-Jacques Rousseau. He was particularly impressed by Baruch Spinoza, whom he saw as a model for a modern version of the Hebraic prophetic tradition. The only other Jewish works he mentioned from this period were Moses Mendelssohn's Jerusalem and Spinoza's Tractatus.

This period of intellectual awakening led to the collapse of his traditional religious beliefs. He described in his diaries a painful transition from orthodox Judaism to a "moral world order" inspired by philosophy, an intimate crisis that he felt set him on a new spiritual and intellectual journey. After reconciling with his father, he was reluctantly permitted to attend the University of Bonn in 1835, where he attended some lectures, but it is uncertain whether he matriculated, and the experience appears to have left little impression on him.

== Early socialist writings ==
=== The Holy History of Mankind ===
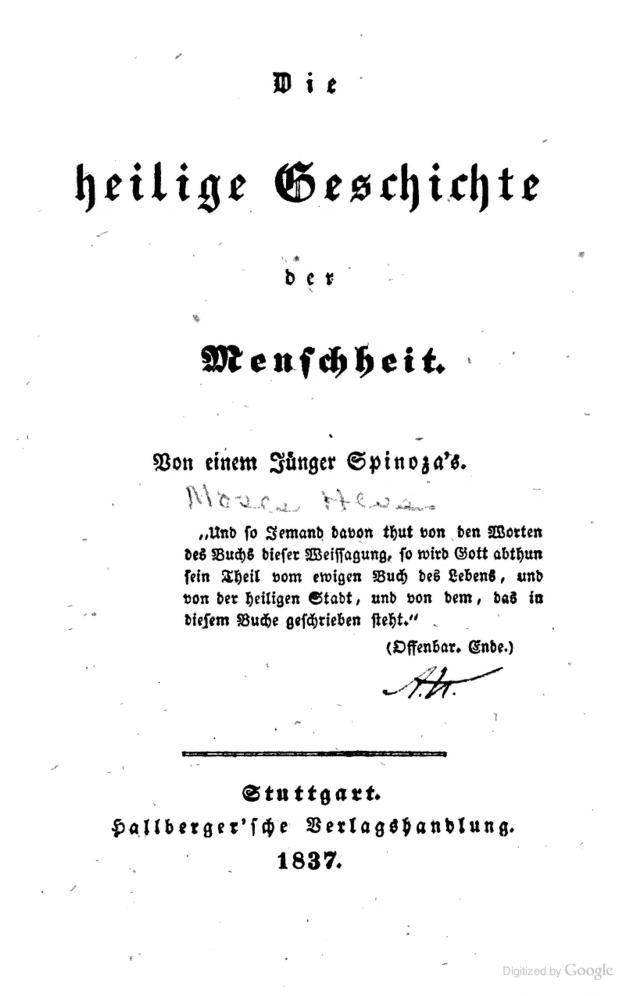
Title page of The Holy History of Mankind (1837)

In 1837, Hess published his first book, Die heilige Geschichte der Menschheit (The Holy History of Mankind). Published anonymously by "a Young Spinozist", it was the first book of socialist theory to be written in Germany, predating Wilhelm Weitling's first work by a year. Completely disregarded at the time, the book was an ambitious and esoteric attempt to propose a socialist synthesis of Judaism and Christianity, mediated through the philosophy of Spinoza. It presented a messianic vision of social redemption based on the abolition of private property and inheritance, which Hess identified as the root of all social evils.

Hess divided human history into three periods, paralleling the Christian Trinity:

1. The era of God the Father: A period of unconscious harmony and community of property, ending with the birth of Jesus.
2. The era of God the Son: A period of disharmony, characterized by a dualism between spirit and matter, which reached its peak in the Middle Ages with the appearance of private property and inheritance.
3. The era of the Holy Spirit: The modern age, initiated by Spinoza and advanced by the French Revolution, destined to culminate in a new, socialized humanity.

For Hess, Spinoza was the prophet of the modern age because his philosophy restored the Judaic unity of spirit and matter, which Christianity had severed. This new era would be characterized by a society based on community of property (Gütergemeinschaft), which Hess saw as the only way to achieve true equality. He traced this ideal to the Mosaic legislation of the Jubilee year, where all land reverted to its original possessors. He argued that private property had led to social polarization, creating an "aristocracy of wealth" (Geldaristokratie) and a growing class of the impoverished (Pauperismus). He predicted this "disharmony, inequality, egoism" would reach a climax, leading to a social revolution. While the book's language was often obscure, its core arguments contained an early sketch of theories of capital concentration and class struggle. At this stage, however, Hess described the contemporary Jewish people as a "spirit without a body," a disembodied idea whose historical mission had been fulfilled and who should now assimilate into the new universal humanity.

The book's conclusion was a dramatic call for a "New Jerusalem"—a socialist future inspired by the original Judaic vision of a society where the holy and the profane, religion and politics, were unified. Though he did not envision a revival of the Jewish people as a separate entity at this time, he argued that the social vision of Judaism, universalized by Spinoza, would serve as the inspiration for the socialist future of all humankind.

=== The European Triarchy ===
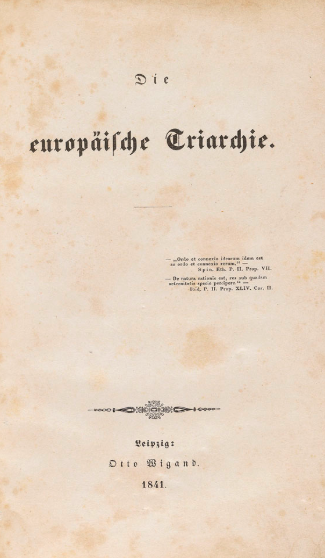
Title page of The European Triarchy (1841)

Hess's second book, Die Europäische Triarchie (The European Triarchy), published anonymously in 1841, was a more mature work that reached a wider audience and established his reputation among German radicals. The book called for a progressive alliance between the three major nations of Western Europe—Germany, France, and England—to lead humanity into a new future against "Russia, the reservoir of reaction". It laid the foundation for the synthesis of German philosophy, French politics, and English social and economic praxis that would later become a cornerstone of Marxism.

Influenced by the Polish philosopher August Cieszkowski, Hess argued that philosophy must move beyond interpreting the world to actively changing it. German philosophy, he claimed, had "led us to the total truth. Now we have to build bridges which would again lead us from heaven to earth." He saw the future European revolution as a synthesis of the unique contributions of the three leading nations: Germany would provide its philosophy, France its political activism, and England its practical experience with social and economic transformation.

Hess identified England as the country where the social revolution would most likely begin, due to its advanced industrialization and the acute social antagonisms between wealth and poverty. He argued that the social crisis was not political but structural, rooted in the economic system, and could not be solved by political reforms alone. The book also continued his engagement with Jewish history, arguing against Hegel's view of the Jews as a static, "Oriental" people without a historical development. Hess contended that the Jews were a central force in universal history, an "intermediary between West and East" whose messianic impulse for change was a permanent element of ferment in Western civilization. He also addressed the issue of Jewish emancipation, criticizing the expectation that Jews should shed their national identity and arguing that obstacles to intermarriage were proof of an incomplete and flawed liberation.

== "True socialism" and collaboration with Marx ==
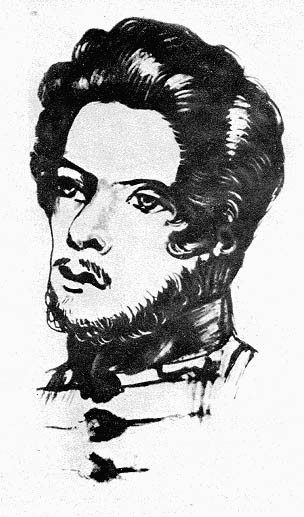
Depiction of the young Karl Marx

In 1841, Hess became a central organizer for the liberal newspaper Rheinische Zeitung, a project that brought him into contact with the young Karl Marx. He was immediately electrified by the encounter and recognized Marx's intellectual genius. In a letter to his friend Berthold Auerbach, Hess described Marx, who was six years his junior, in hyperbolic terms:

Be prepared to meet the greatest, perhaps the only real philosopher living now. ... He combines deepest philosophical seriousness with cutting wit. Can you imagine Rousseau, Voltaire, Holbach, Lessing, Heine and Hegel combined—not thrown together—in one person? If you can, you have Dr. Marx.

Hess played a crucial role in introducing both Marx and Friedrich Engels to socialist and communist ideas, and his own thought was a key influence on their early development. It was Hess who converted the young Engels to communism in late 1842, and Engels later called him "the first communist in the party" and the "first to reach communism by the philosophical path". Hess's "hot eloquence" also likely "shook the foundations of [Marx's] faith in Hegelian political theory". After moving to Paris in late 1842, Hess became a primary source of information on French socialist thought for German radicals. He collaborated with Marx on the Deutsch-Französische Jahrbücher and with both Marx and Engels on The German Ideology. In 1847, he joined them in the Communist League.

During this period, Hess developed his theory of "ethical socialism" and articulated one of the earliest and most influential critiques of alienation (Entfremdung). In essays such as On Money (Über das Geldwesen), written in 1843–44 for the Jahrbücher but not published at the time, Hess pioneered the application of Ludwig Feuerbach's theory of religious alienation to the economic sphere. What God is to theoretical life, he wrote, money is to practical life: the alienated, "reified activity" of humanity. Humans are forced to sell their "free life activity" and become enslaved to "this caput mortuum called Capital". Marx read the unpublished manuscript and adopted many of its central ideas and metaphors for his own essay "On the Jewish Question", which was written shortly after and published in the same journal.

Hess's socialism was founded on moral principles, in contrast to the "scientific socialism" of Marx and Engels, who eventually derided Hess's views as "true socialism"—a utopian sentimentalism based on Feuerbachian notions of universal love rather than class struggle. Hess's analysis linked the structure of capitalism to Christian theology. He argued that the Christian dualism between a perfect heaven and a corrupt earthly world provided the ideological model for the alienation of bourgeois society. Just as Christianity postpones salvation to the hereafter, capitalism legitimizes real-world servitude by promising abstract freedom. He identified capitalism not with Judaism, as Marx later would, but with Christianity, whose focus on the salvation of the individual soul reflected the egoism of commercial life.

Hess also drafted a precursor to the Communist Manifesto called A Communist Confession in Questions and Answers (1844), which outlined a program for a gradual transition to communism. He argued against immediate and violent expropriation, proposing instead a series of transitional measures, such as a progressive income tax and the abolition of inheritance, to create a public sector that would eventually displace private industry. Many of these practical suggestions were later incorporated by Marx and Engels into the Manifesto.

== 1848 Revolutions and exile ==
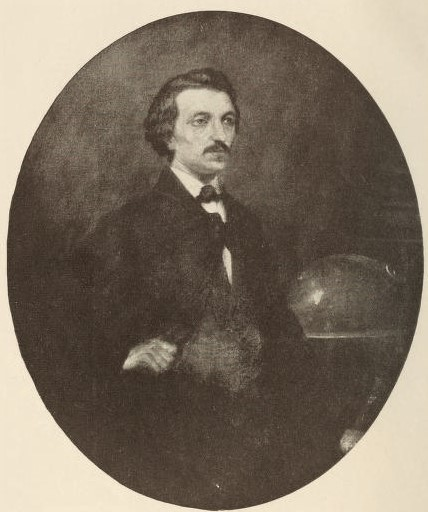
Hess in 1853

Hess returned to Germany with the outbreak of the Revolutions of 1848 and attempted to revive the Rheinische Zeitung. He moved incessantly throughout the period, from Paris to Geneva, Strassburg, and Zurich. A claim made by his widow that he was condemned to death for his role in the uprising is likely a "pious invention". Like many radicals, he was deeply disillusioned by the failure of the revolutions. Unlike many of his former allies, Hess did not retreat into inactivity or become a reactionary; he wandered and starved in Switzerland, Belgium, and Holland, at one point opening a brush shop in Marseilles, before finally settling in Paris in 1854.

In the aftermath, Hess engaged in a significant debate about the future of European socialism with the Russian revolutionary thinker Alexander Herzen. In a series of unpublished letters written in 1850, Hess criticized Herzen's belief that a primitive and uncorrupted Russia, with its ancient village commune, would lead the redemption of a decadent Europe. Hess rejected this view as "reactionary socialism", arguing that Russia's social structure was a "fossil" and its lack of historical development was a sign of stagnation, not revolutionary potential. He countered Herzen's ideological focus with a materialist analysis, insisting that a true social revolution could only emerge from the economic conditions of advanced industrial societies, not from a "Slavonic illusion". The future, he argued, belonged not to Russia but to England, the country where the contradictions of capitalism were most developed.

In 1851, the death of his father left Hess with a modest inheritance, allowing him to live as an independent writer in Paris. In 1852, he legally married Sibylle Pesch, a working-class Catholic woman with whom he had been living since the early 1840s; he had originally entered the relationship as an act to "redress the injustice perpetrated by society". During the 1850s, a low point for the socialist movement, Hess devoted himself to studies in the natural sciences, seeking to develop a philosophy that transcended the distinction between materialism and idealism, echoing his early fascination with Spinoza. His aim was to ground his socialist ethics in the objective laws of nature, creating a secure, scientific basis for his social theory.

== Proto-Zionism: Rome and Jerusalem ==
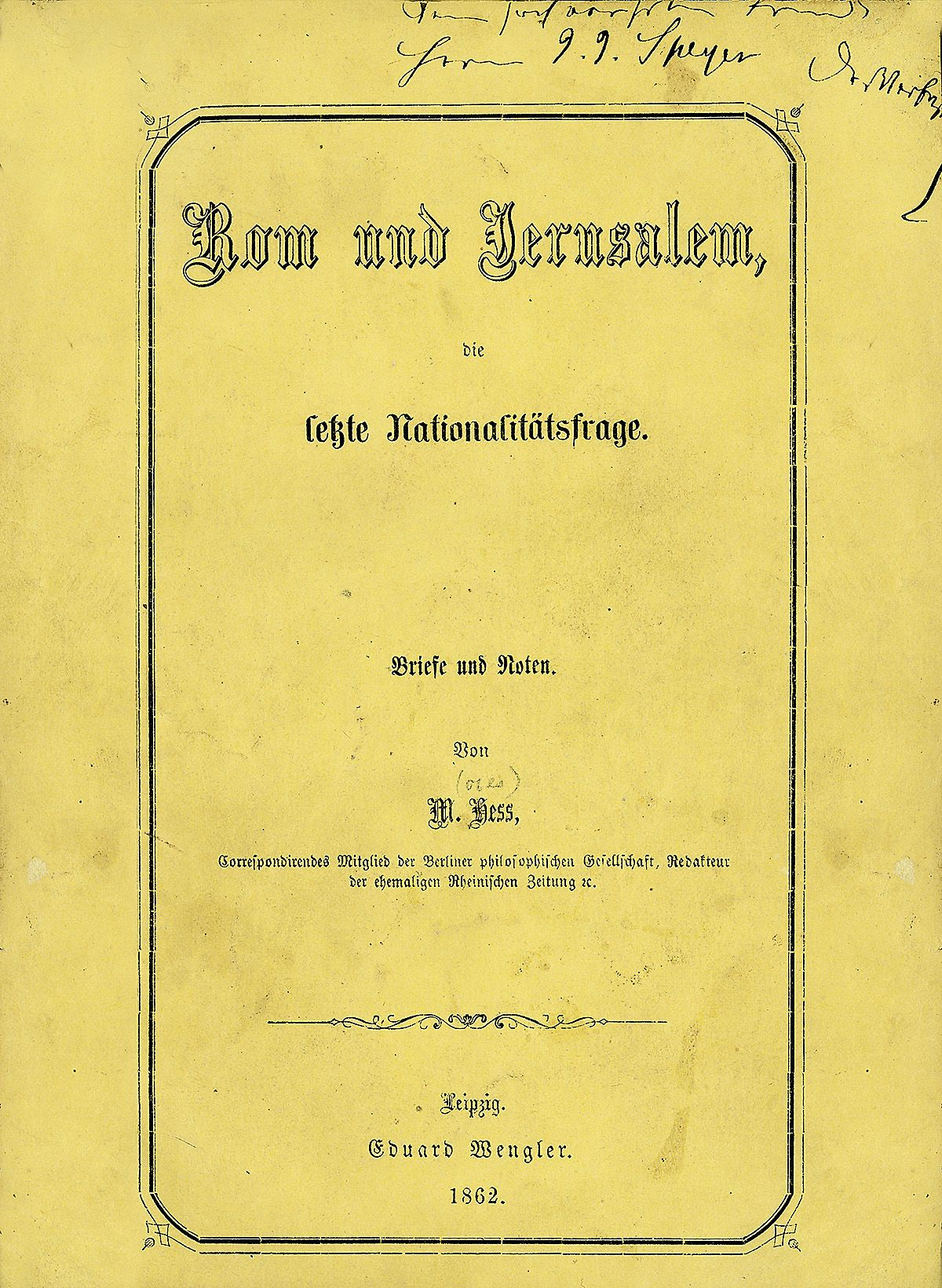
Title page of Rome and Jerusalem (1862)

In 1862, after returning to Germany under a political amnesty, Hess published Rome and Jerusalem: The Last National Question, a book that marked his public turn to Jewish nationalism and established him as a foundational thinker of modern Zionism. The book's complex and fragmented structure—a series of letters, notes, and an epilogue—and its passionate, emotional style drew criticism from contemporaries like Ludwig Philippson, who accused Hess of hypocrisy. The appearance of the book surprised his socialist colleagues, but Shlomo Avineri argues that it was not a sudden break from his past but rather the culmination of themes present in his thought from the beginning, such as his sensitivity to the role of national identity in history. The book's immediate context was the unification of Italy—the "liberation of the Eternal City on the Tiber", which Hess saw as a sign that the "liberation of the Eternal City on Mount Moriah" would follow.

The book's central premise was that the Jews were a nation, not merely a religious community. Hess argued that the liberal and Reform Jewish ideal of assimilation was a dead end based on self-deception. He was sharply critical of the German concept of Bildung (self-cultivation), which he believed promoted an abstract, disembodied ideal of the person that required Jews to deny their own distinctive history and character. He contended that German anti-Semitism was not a remnant of medieval religious prejudice but a modern racial antagonism that could not be overcome by conversion or cultural integration. "The Germans hate less the Jewish religion than they hate their race," he wrote. "Neither religious reform nor baptism, neither Enlightenment nor Emancipation will open the gates of social life before the Jews." Drawing on the emerging race science of the 1850s, Hess defined the Jews as one of the original, primary races of humanity, whose national character was immutable. Because Jews would always be seen as strangers in Europe, their only solution was to reclaim their own national identity.

Hess envisioned the "re-establishment of a Jewish state" in Palestine. This national revival, however, was inextricably linked to his socialist principles. The new Jewish society would not be based on bourgeois individualism but on Mosaic principles, which he defined as "social-democratic". Land would be held in common, and agriculture, industry, and commerce would be organized on cooperative principles to create a just and egalitarian society. He believed this project would find its main support not among the assimilated Jews of Western Europe but among the traditional Jewish masses of Eastern Europe and the Orient, whose "deep longing" for redemption had preserved the authentic national spirit. This prediction—that the pioneers would come from the East—led Isaiah Berlin to call it "one of the most exact true prophecies ever made". Hess also expressed a newfound appreciation for the Hassidic movement as a genuine, living spiritual force in contrast to the "dilute Judaism" of the Reformers. He expressed a deeply ambivalent attitude toward Jewish tradition, famously describing its sacrificial cult as a "scar on the face of my beloved" which, though a blemish, was also a unique mark of individuality that he could not abandon.

Hess did not see this as a purely Jewish affair. He placed the Jewish national movement within the context of European nationalism and geopolitics, arguing that France under Napoleon III, with its interests in the Suez Canal and its tradition of supporting national liberation, would be the natural patron of the new Jewish commonwealth. His vision was for a socialist Jewish commonwealth to serve as a model society and a bridge of culture and progress between Europe and Asia.

== Later years and legacy ==
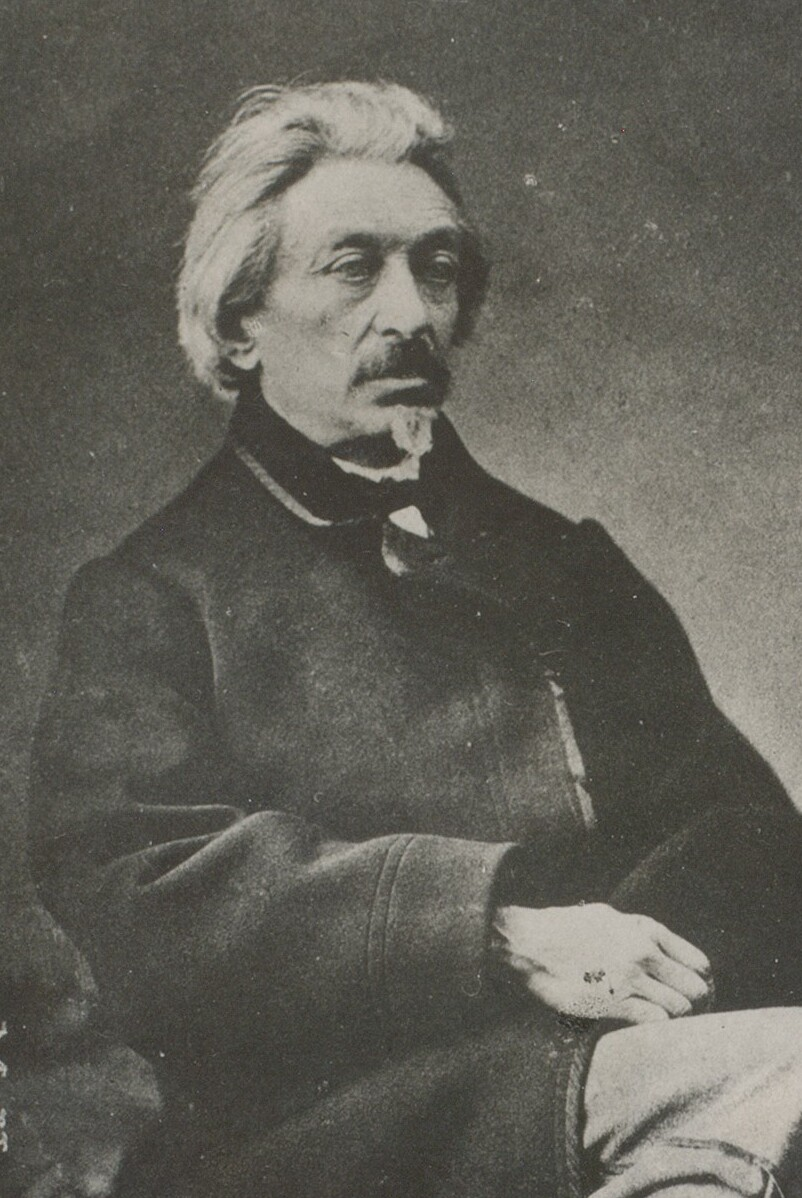
Hess in his later years

After the publication of Rome and Jerusalem, Hess continued his dual engagement with socialist and Jewish affairs. He remained active in the socialist movement and, with the founding of the International Workingmen's Association (the First International) in 1864, he became deeply involved in its activities, often serving as Marx's personal representative at its congresses on the continent. As a "Marxist delegate", he fought the doctrines of his old friends Pierre-Joseph Proudhon and Mikhail Bakunin. He also participated in the controversies surrounding Ferdinand Lassalle's socialist agitation in Germany and published The Rights of Labor in 1863, a defense of socialism against liberal cooperative ideas. At the same time, he corresponded extensively with Jewish figures like the historian Heinrich Graetz and wrote numerous articles on Jewish nationalism, history, and messianism, reinforcing the arguments of Rome and Jerusalem.

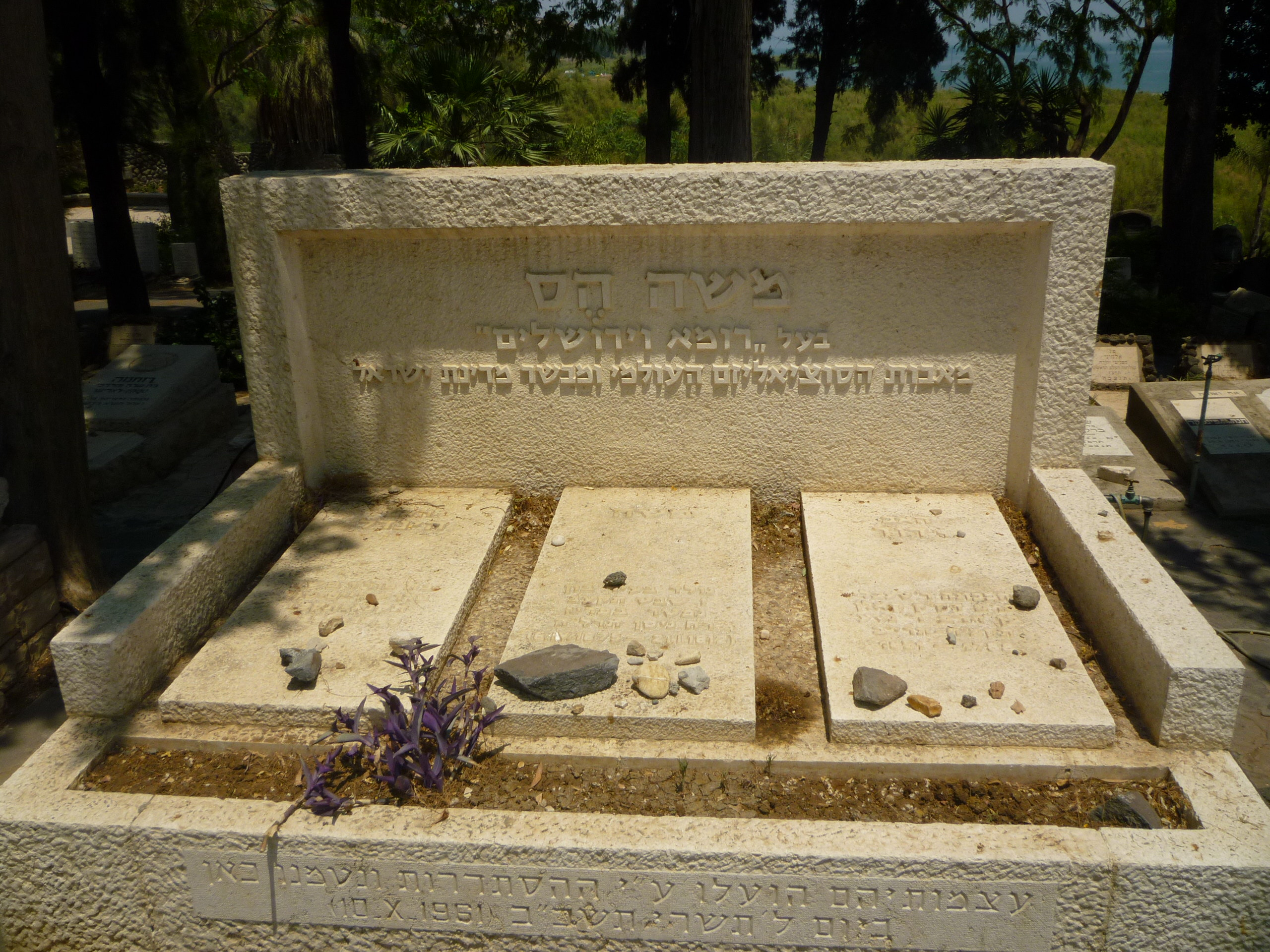
Hess's grave in Kinneret Cemetery, Israel

The reception of Rome and Jerusalem among educated German Jews was exceedingly hostile. The scholar Moritz Steinschneider called Hess a "repentant sinner" (Ein Baal Teschuva), and the leader of Reform Judaism, Abraham Geiger, dismissed him as an "old romantic with new reactionary plans". Hess spent his last years in constant illness and died in Paris on 6 April 1875, having lived for the most part in "obscurity and poverty". In accordance with his wishes, he was buried in the Jewish cemetery in Deutz, near Cologne. The German Social Democratic Party, which he had helped found, engraved on his tombstone the inscription "Father of German Social Democracy". In 1961, his remains were moved from Germany to Israel and reinterred in the Kinneret Cemetery, alongside other founders of socialist Zionism.

Hess's legacy is complex and has been claimed by two movements that often found themselves in opposition. In his time, Rome and Jerusalem had little direct impact; Theodor Herzl had never heard of it when he composed The Jewish State (1896). However, Hess's ideas were later rediscovered and became part of the "general baggage of socialist Zionism". When Herzl read Rome und Jerusalem in 1901, he said of Hess, "Everything we have tried is already in his book." Hess's early socialist writings, though less systematic than Marx's, were a formative influence on the development of Marxism, with David McLellan describing Hess as the "first propagator of communist ideas in Germany" who "pioneered the application of radical ideas in the field of economics". Avineri concludes that Hess's two intellectual paths were not successive or contradictory but "coexisted side by side, complemented each other and grew out of the same critical attitude to nineteenth-century bourgeois society."

Other scholars, however, emphasize the profound tensions in Hess's thought. Ken Koltun-Fromm argues that the unresolved conflicts in his work, particularly between universalist ethics and national particularism, are not a flaw but rather a "meaningful testament and witness to the complexity of modern... Jewish identity." Unlike Marx, who largely overlooked the power of nationalism, Hess integrated the national and social questions, creating a synthesis that, in Avineri's view, "did correctly divine the spirit of the age: a universal quest for redemption, yet anchored in a concrete historical culture."

== Selected works ==
- Holy History of Mankind (1837)
- European Triarchy (1841)
- Socialism and Communism (1842)
- Die Philosophie der Tat (The Philosophy of Action, 1843)
- On the Monetary System, also translated as On the Essence of Money (Über das Geldwesen, 1845)
- Communist Confession of Faith (London, 1846)
- Consequences of a Revolution of the Proletariat (1847)
- Rome and Jerusalem Leipzig: Eduard Mengler (1862)
- Letters on the Mission of Israel (1864)
- High Finance and the Empire (1869)
- Les Collectivistes et les Communistes (1869)
- The Dynamic Theory of Matter (1877)
- Jüdische Schriften (anthology edited by Theodor Zlocisti; Berlin: Louis Lamm, 1905)

=== Translations ===
- The Holy History and Mankind and Other Writings. ed. Shlomo Avineri (Cambridge University Press, 2005).
- The History of the Jews, Volume III, Graetz (1866–1867, into French)

== Citations ==
=== Works cited ===
- Avineri, Shlomo (1985). Moses Hess: Prophet of Communism and Zionism. New York: New York University Press. ISBN 0-8147-0584-7.
- Berlin, Isaiah (1959). The Life and Opinions of Moses Hess. Cambridge: Heffer.
- Koltun-Fromm, Ken (2001). Moses Hess and Modern Jewish Identity. Bloomington: Indiana University Press. ISBN 0-253-33934-0.
- McLellan, David (1969). The Young Hegelians and Karl Marx. London: Macmillan.
