= Marxism and religion =

19th-century German philosopher Karl Marx, the founder and primary theorist of Marxism, viewed religion as "the soul of soulless conditions" or the "opium of the people". He believed religion survives because of oppressive social conditions. When this oppressive and exploitative condition is destroyed, religion will become unnecessary, according to Marx. At the same time, he saw religion as a form of working-class protest against poor economic conditions and alienation. Denys Turner, a scholar of Marx and historical theology, classified Marx's views as adhering to post-theism, a philosophical position that regards worshiping deities as an eventually obsolete, but temporarily necessary, stage in humanity's historical spiritual development.

In his interpretation and synthesis of Marx, Vladimir Lenin theorized state-sanctioned religion as an ideological apparatus of the bourgeoisie, and its places of worship as institutions providing justification for ruling ideas to the working class, while retaining Marx's view of religion's dual role as proletarian protest and solace. A number of Marxist-Leninist governments in the 20th century, such as the Soviet Union after Vladimir Lenin and the People's Republic of China headed by Mao Zedong, implemented state atheism to allow the "opium" to be decentralized in secular civics, in line with post-theism.

== Marxist political theorists and revolutionaries on religion ==
=== Karl Marx and Friedrich Engels ===
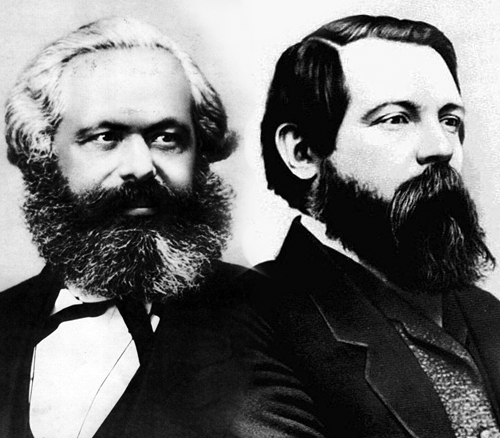
Karl Marx (left) and Friedrich Engels (right)

Karl Marx's religious views have been the subject of much interpretation. In the Critique of Hegel's Philosophy of Right of 1843, Marx said religion is a man-made concept and, as such, reflects human conditions. He saw religion as an "inverted consciousness of the world" reflecting an inverted, unjust society. He argued that religion is both an expression of distress and a protest against the real distress. "Religion is the sigh of the oppressed creature, the heart of a heartless world, and the soul of soulless conditions. It is the opium of the people," Marx wrote. The abolition of religion as "illusory happiness" would lead to real happiness, he said — but only if people were freed from oppressive material conditions.

Criticism has plucked the imaginary flowers on the chain not in order that man shall continue to bear that chain without fantasy or consolation, but so that he shall throw off the chain and pluck the living flower.

— Karl Marx, A Contribution to the Critique of Hegel’s Philosophy of Right

According to Howard Zinn, "[t]his helps us understand the mass appeal of the religious charlatans of the television screen, as well as the work of Liberation Theology in joining the soulfulness of religion to the energy of revolutionary movements in miserably poor countries". Some recent scholarship has suggested that "opium of the people" is itself a dialectical metaphor, a "protest" and an "expression" of suffering.

Some view the early Christian Church, such as the one described in the Acts of the Apostles, as an early form of communism and religious socialism. They believe communism was just Christianity in practice and Jesus was the first communist. This link was highlighted in one of Marx's early writings, in which he wrote: "As Christ is the intermediary unto whom man unburdens all his divinity, all his religious bonds, so the state is the mediator unto which he transfers all his Godlessness, all his human liberty". Furthermore, Thomas Müntzer led a large Anabaptist communist movement during the German Peasants' War which Friedrich Engels analysed in The Peasant War in Germany. The Marxist ethos that aims for unity reflects the Christian universalist teaching that humankind is one and that there is only one God who does not discriminate among people. Tristram Hunt attributes a religious persuasion to Engels.

Roland Boer asserts that Marx's depiction of religion as 'opium', while suspicious of religion's addictive potential, also emphasizes religion's medicinal properties akin to those of opium in Western medicine.

=== Vladimir Lenin ===
In The Attitude of the Workers’ Party to Religion, Lenin repeated that religion is the "opium of the people" and emphasized that religion and its institutions are instruments of the ruling class.

Nonetheless, Lenin initially allowed Christians and other religious people in the Bolshevik Party. While critical of religion, Lenin also specifically made a point to not include it in Our Programme or his ideological goals, arguing that the religious question is tied to class struggle. He emphasized that religion is a product of capitalism and that unity in the revolutionary struggle "for the creation of a paradise on earth is more important to us than unity of proletarian opinion on paradise in heaven."

In 1919, Lenin partially reversed this stance. Responding to the question of whether people who took part in religious ceremonies could remain in the party, Lenin wrote that he would expel them.

=== Joseph Stalin ===
Joseph Stalin's public statements on religion throughout his years serving as General Secretary of the CPSU were scarce. In 1927, answering the question of an American trade union delegate, Stalin affirmed that the Communist Party must have an anti-religious policy. He said this was because the party stood for science and contrasted the position to the prosecution of Darwinists in America. Stalin also emphasized the importance of undermining the "reactionary clergy who poison the minds of the toiling masses."

=== Nikolai Bukharin and Evgenii Preobrazhensky ===
In their influential book The ABC of Communism, Nikolai Bukharin and Evgenii Preobrazhensky spoke out strongly against religion, writing that "Communism is incompatible with religious faith". However, the two placed importance on patience, energy, and perseverance toward the religious, saying that forcing atheism on people would set back the movement against religion. "If the church were to be persecuted, it would win sympathy among the masses, for persecution would remind them of the almost forgotten days when there was an association between religion and the defence of national freedom; it would strengthen the antisemitic movement; and in general it would mobilize all the vestiges of an ideology which is already beginning to die out", they wrote.

=== Anatoly Lunacharsky ===
God-Building was an idea proposed by some prominent early Marxists of the Bolshevik faction of the Russian Social Democratic Labour Party. Inspired by Ludwig Feuerbach's "religion of humanity", it had some precedent in the French Revolution with the "cult of reason". The idea proposed that in place of the abolition of religion, there should be a meta-religious context in which religions were viewed primarily in terms of the psychological and social effect of ritual, myth and symbolism in an attempt to harness this force for pro-communist aims, both by creating new ritual and symbolism and by re-interpreting existing ritual and symbolism in a socialist context. In contrast to the atheism of Lenin, the God-Builders took an official position of agnosticism.

=== Kim Il-Sung ===
North Korean leader Kim Il Sung wrote about religion in the context of Korea's national liberation struggle against Japan. In that context, Kim criticized the Protestant Christian creed, stating that while "[t]here is no law preventing religious believers from making the revolution," their lack of action led to "non-resistance" and psalms alone could not block the Japanese guns when "decisive battles" were necessary.

Kim's writings addressed the "opium of the people" metaphor twice, both in the context of responding to comrades who object to working with religious groups (Chonbulygo and Chondoism). In the first instance, Kim replies that a person is "mistaken" if he or she believes the proposition that religion is the "opium of the people" can be applied in all instances, explaining that if a religion "prays for dealing out divine punishment to Japan and blessing the Korean nation" then it is a "patriotic religion" and its believers are patriots. In the second, Kim states that Marx's metaphor "must not be construed radically and unilaterally" because Marx was warning against "the temptation of a religious mirage and not opposing believers in general." Because the communist movement in Korea was fighting a struggle for "national salvation" against Japan, Kim writes that anyone with a similar agenda can join the struggle and that "even a religionist ... must be enrolled in our ranks without hesitation."

== Religion in Marxist–Leninist states ==
=== Soviet Union ===
The Soviet Union was an atheist state in which religion was largely discouraged and at times heavily persecuted. According to various Soviet and Western sources, over one-third of the country's people still professed religious belief (Christianity and Islam had the most believers). Christians belonged to various churches: Orthodox, which had the largest number of followers; Catholic; Oriental Orthodox (mainly Armenian Apostolic Church) and Baptist and other Protestant denominations. The majority of the Islamic faithful were Sunni (with a notable Shia minority, mainly in Azerbaijan), while Judaism also had many followers. Other religions, which were practiced by a relatively small number of believers, included Buddhism and Shamanism. After 1941 in the Stalin era, religious persecution was greatly reduced. To gather support from the masses during World War II, the Stalin government re-opened thousands of temples and extinguished the League of Militant Atheists. Atheist propaganda returned to a lesser extent during the Khrushchev government and continued in a less strict way during the Brezhnev years.

The role of religion in the daily lives of Soviet citizens varied greatly, but two-thirds of the Soviet population were irreligious. About half the people, including members of the ruling Communist Party and high-level government officials, professed atheism. For the majority of Soviet citizens, religion seemed irrelevant. Prior to its collapse in late 1991, official figures on religion in the Soviet Union were not available. State atheism in the Soviet Union was known as gosateizm.

=== Socialist People's Republic of Albania ===
Albania was declared an atheist state by Enver Hoxha. Religion in Albania was subordinated in the interest of nationalism during periods of national revival, when it was identified as foreign predation to Albanian culture. During the late 19th century and also when Albania became a state, religions were suppressed in order to better unify Albanians. This nationalism was also used to justify the communist stance of state atheism between 1967 and 1991. This policy was mainly applied and felt within the borders of the present Albanian state, producing a nonreligious majority in the population.

=== People's Republic of China ===
The People's Republic of China was established in 1949 and for much of its early history maintained a hostile attitude toward religion which was seen as emblematic of feudalism and foreign colonialism. Mao Zedong struggled against traditional religions, describing them as superstition to be discarded. Houses of worship, including temples, mosques and churches, were converted into non-religious buildings for secular use. However, this attitude relaxed considerably in the late 1970s with the end of the Cultural Revolution. The 1978 Constitution of the People's Republic of China guaranteed "freedom of religion" with a number of restrictions. Since the mid-1990s, there has been a massive program to rebuild Buddhist and Taoist temples that were destroyed in the Cultural Revolution. However, the Chinese Communist Party still remains explicitly atheist and religion is heavily regulated, with only specific state-operated churches, mosques and temples being allowed for worship.

=== Cambodia ===
==== Democratic Kampuchea ====
Pol Pot, leader of the Khmer Rouge regime, suppressed Cambodia’s Buddhist religion as monks were defrocked; temples and artifacts, including statues of the Buddha, were destroyed; and people praying or expressing other religious sentiments were often killed. The Christian and Muslim communities were among the most persecuted as well. The Roman Catholic cathedral of Phnom Penh was razed. The Khmer Rouge forced Muslims to eat pork, which they believe is prohibited unless they are starving. Many of those who refused were killed. Christian clergy and Muslim imams were executed.

==== People's Republic of Kampuchea ====
After the overthrow of the Khmer Rouge, a socialist state more reflective of the values shared by Vietnam and allies of the Soviet Union was established. Oppression of religious groups was nearly totally ended and relations between religious groups and the People's Republic of Kampuchea were much more neutral throughout its existence until the restoration of the monarchy a decade later.

=== Laos ===
In contrast with the brutal repression of the sangha undertaken in Cambodia, the Communist government of Laos has not sought to oppose or suppress Buddhism in Laos to any great degree. Rather, since the early days of the Pathet Lao, communist officials have sought to use the influence and respect afforded to Buddhist clergy to achieve political goals while discouraging religious practices seen as detrimental to Marxist aims.

Starting as early as the late 1950s, members of the Pathet Lao sought to encourage support for the communist cause by aligning members of the Lao sangha with the communist opposition. Though resisted by the Royal Lao Government, these efforts were fairly successful and resulted in increased support for the Pathet Lao, particularly in rural communities.

=== North Korea ===
North Korea's constitution guarantees freedom of religion in Article 68, although that principle is limited by the requirement that religion may not be used as a pretext to harm the state, introduce foreign forces, or harm the existing social order. In North Korea, the state recognizes and favors Chondoism as a distinctly Korean revolutionary religion.

Following the Korean War, Christians generally organized in house churches or small congregations. In the 1960, the government permitted two hundred informal congregations in former centers of Christianity.

=== Socialist Republic of Romania ===
During its Socialist era, the Romanian government exerted significant control over the Orthodox Church and closely monitored religious activity, as well as promoting atheism among the population. Dissident priests were censured, arrested, deported, and/or defrocked, but the Orthodox Church as a whole acquiesced to the government's demands and received support from it. Unlike other Eastern Bloc states where clergy were forced to rely on donations or subsistence wages, Orthodox clergy in Romania were paid a salary equivalent to the average received by the general population, and received significant state subsidies for the reconstruction of churches destroyed in the war. Starting in the 1960s, the state used religious officials of the Orthodox Church as ambassadors to the West, engaging in dialogue with religious organizations in the United Kingdom. This relatively favorable attitude towards the church continued until the death of Patriarch Justinian of Romania in 1977, at which point the state began a new anti-church campaign, engaging in urban renewal projects that entailed the destruction of churches.

== Relations between communism and religions ==
=== Christianity ===
Roland Boer argues that theological influences permeate the works of "Biblical Marxists" Ernst Bloch and Walter Benjamin, "Catholic Marxists" Althusser, Henri Lefebvre, Antonio Gramsci and Terry Eagleton, and the Marxists of the 'Protestant Turn' in Žižek and Adorno.

In The Communist Manifesto, Karl Marx and Friedrich Engels wrote: "Nothing is easier than to give Christian asceticism a Socialist tinge. Has not Christianity declaimed against private property, against marriage, against the State? Has it not preached in place of these, charity and poverty, celibacy and mortification of the flesh, monastic life and Mother Church? Christian Socialism is but the holy water with which the priest consecrates the heart-burnings of the aristocrat." In Socialism: Utopian and Scientific, Engels drew a certain analogy between the sort of utopian communalism of some of the early Christian communities and the modern-day communist movement, the scientific communist movement representing the proletariat in this era and its world historic transformation of society. Engels noted both certain similarities and certain contrasts.

Christian communism can be seen as a radical form of Christian socialism. It is a theological and political theory based upon the view that the teachings of Jesus Christ compel Christians to support communism as the ideal social system. Although there is no universal agreement on the exact date when Christian communism was founded, many Christian communists assert that evidence from the Bible suggests that the first Christians, including the Apostles, created their own small communist society in the years following Jesus' death and resurrection. Advocates of Christian communism argue that it was taught by Jesus and practiced by the Apostles themselves.

Contemporary communism, including contemporary Christian communism, owes much to Marxist thought—particularly Marxian economics. While not all communists are in full agreement with Marxism, communists share the Marxist critique of capitalism. Marxism includes a complex array of views that cover several different fields of human knowledge and one may easily distinguish between Marxist philosophy, Marxist sociology and Marxist economics. Marxist sociology and Marxist economics have no connection to religious issues and make no assertions about such things. On the other hand, Marxist philosophy is famously atheistic, although some Marxist scholars, both Christian and non-Christian, have insisted that Marxist philosophy and the philosophy of Marx and Engels are significantly different from one another and that this difference needs recognition. In particular, Jose Porfirio Miranda found Marx and Engels to be consistently opposed to deterministic materialism and broadly sympathetic towards Christianity and towards the text of the Bible, although disbelieving in a supernatural deity.

In the 20th century, many analysts of Marx's works began to believe that Marx did not condemn religion in its entirety, but rather the Prussian Protestantism he encountered in Germany specifically:

Like most of the revisions of orthodox Marxism-Leninism in those years, this transformed critique of religion was first presented as a return to the real Marx. The master had defined religion not only as an opium but also as a protest; that is, religion was not only a drug which the believer used to stomach the hopelessness of his social status but also as a sign of protest and of mute resistance against this status. Using this distinction between opiate and protest functions, many writers contended that Marx did not condemn religion as such but a very specific form thereof, namely the Protestantism of the Prussia of Wilhelm IV. Marx's definition of religion as an opiate would, on this reading, be not a "metaphysical specification of religion," but the expression of experience within a certain historical period and in a certain geographical area. Even Christian participants in dialogue picked up on this statement and made it a ground for approaching Marxism.

An attempt to reconciliate religion with communism has been made by the followers of Eurocommunism. The Eurocommunists of Italy, France and Spain considered it essential to reach out to the Catholic population and secure their help in construction of socialism. This entailed abandoning state atheism in favor of secularism and allowing a greater tolerance of Catholicism, as well as toning down the critique of religion in favor of praising specific aspects of religion, such as the solidarity and camaraderie of Catholics, especially in the context of anomie. This shift was particularly noticeable in the Italian Communist Party, which included several left-leaning Catholics as "independents" on its electoral lists. Many Italian communists such as Lucio Lombardo-Radice and Cesare Luporini started advocating for greater cooperation with Catholics, which led Enrico Berlinguer to highlight that the PCI "does not espouse atheism" at the 15th Congress of the party in 1979.

==== Liberation theology ====
In the 1950s and the 1960s, liberation theology was the political praxis of Latin American theologians, such as Gustavo Gutiérrez of Peru, Leonardo Boff of Brazil, Juan Luis Segundo of Uruguay and Jon Sobrino of Spain, who made popular the phrase the "Preferential option for the poor". While liberation theology was most influential in Latin America, it has also been developed in other parts of the world such as black theology in the United States and South Africa, Palestinian liberation theology, Dalit theology in India and Minjung theology in South Korea. Consisting of a synthesis of Christian theology and Marxist socioeconomic analyses, liberation theology stresses social concern for the poor and advocates for liberation for oppressed peoples. In addition to being a theological matter, liberation theology was often tied to concrete political practice.

Camilo Torres Restrepo was one of the key thinkers of liberation theology. After his death, Torres became an icon in Colombia and in the rest of Latin America, as well as among many Catholics worldwide. Torres argued that Christians had fought socioeconomic inequalities in the past, and while the Gospel was not intended to change society, it influenced important changes like the abolition of slavery, the democratic valorization of the human being and Marxist humanism. Because of that, Torres considered Marxist humanism a product of the Christian humanist movement. Torres expressed his disappointment with the Church for its exclusively spiritual approach to social problems, arguing that a spiritual approach shouldn't exclude a socioeconomic one. He saw an alliance between Marxists and Catholics as necessary, arguing that they are the only movements that could bring about political change, and that both are devoted to fighting social inequality. He believed in the necessity of a revolution, seeing the poverty in Colombia as proof that the hitherto peaceful ways of the Catholic Church to bring about change have failed.

=== Islam ===
From the 1940s through the 1960s, communists, socialists and Islamists sometimes joined forces in opposing colonialism and seeking national independence. The communist Tudeh Party of Iran was allied with the Islamists in their ultimately successful rebellion against the Shah Pahlavi in 1979, although after the Shah was overthrown the Islamists turned on their one-time allies. The Organization of Struggle for the Emancipation of the Working Class, an extinct political party which opposed the Islamic Republic, once advocated communist ideals.

Communist philosopher Mir-Said (Mirza) Sultan-Galiev, Joseph Stalin's protégé at the People's Commissariat for Nationalities (Narkomnats), wrote in The Life of Nationalities, the Narkomnats' journal.

=== Judaism ===
During the Russian Civil War, Jews were seen as Communist sympathizers and thousands were murdered in pogroms by the White Army. During the Red Scare in the United States in the 1950s, a representative of the American Jewish Committee assured the powerful House Committee on Un-American Activities that "Judaism and Communism are utterly incompatible". On the other hand, some Orthodox Jews, including a number of prominent religious figures, actively supported either anarchist or Marxist versions of communism. Examples include Rabbi Yehuda Ashlag, an outspoken libertarian communist, Russian revolutionary and territorialist leader Isaac Steinberg and Rabbi Abraham Bik, an American Communist activist.

=== Baháʼí Faith ===
Analysis reveals that the Baháʼí Faith as both a doctrinal manifest and as a present-day emerging organised community is highly cooperative in nature with elements that correspond to various threads of Marxist thought, anarchist thought and more recent liberational thought innovations. Such elements include, for example, no clergy and themes that relate to mutualism, libertarian socialism and democratic confederalism. There are many similarities and differences between the schools of thought, but one of the most common things they share are the time frame within which both ideologies were founded as well as some social and economic perspective. A book by the Association for Baháʼí Studies was written as a dialogue between the two schools of thought.

=== Buddhism ===
Buddhism has been said to be compatible with communism given that both can be interpreted as atheistic and arguably share some similarities regarding their views of the world of nature and the relationship between matter and mind. Regardless, Buddhists have still been persecuted in some Communist states, notably China, Mongolia and Cambodia under the Khmer Rouge.

Many supporters of the Viet Cong were Buddhists, strongly believing in the unification of Vietnam, with many opposing South Vietnam due to former President Ngo Dinh Diem's persecution of Buddhism during the early 1960s. The current Dalai Lama Tenzin Gyatso speaks positively of Marxism despite the heavy persecution of the Tibetan people by the post-Mao Zedong and post-Cultural Revolution Chinese government. The Dalai Lama further stated that "[o]f all the modern economic theories, the economic system of Marxism is founded on moral principles, while capitalism is concerned only with gain and profitability. [...] The failure of the regime in the former Soviet Union was, for me, not the failure of Marxism but the failure of totalitarianism. For this reason I still think of myself as half-Marxist, half-Buddhist".

In India, B. R. Ambedkar wrote in his essay Buddha or Karl Marx that "[t]he Russians are proud of their Communism. But they forget that the wonder of all wonders is that the Buddha established Communism so far as the Sangh was concerned without dictatorship. It may be that it was a communism on a very small scale but it was communism without dictatorship a miracle which Lenin failed to do."

== Religious criticism of communism ==
Because of the perceived atheistic nature of communism, some have accused communism of persecuting religion. Another criticism suggests that communism – despite its own claims for a scientific basis in dialectical materialism, and disregarding Marxism's open and evolving canon of scriptures from Marx to Mao and beyond – is in itself a religion – or at least a "caricature of religion".

=== "Godless communism" ===
Throughout the Second Red Scare of the late 1940s and 1950s, the fear of the "Godless communist" rooted itself as an epithet and a warning to the United States in a changing global environment. As the perceived threat of the "Godless communist" and of materialism to the American way of life grew, "the choice between Americanism and Communism was vital, without room for compromise".

== See also ==
- Anarchism and religion
- Antireligion
- Christian atheism
- Jewish atheism
- Liberation theology
- Marxist–Leninist atheism
- Red Terror
- Religious communism
- Religious persecution
- State Secretary for Church Affairs
- Jewish Communist Party
