= Shlomo Avineri =

Israeli political scientist (1933–2023)

- שלמה אבינרי
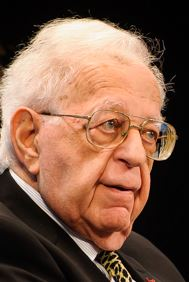
- Avineri in 2014
- Born: Jerzy Wiener; 20 August 1933; Bielsko, Poland
- Died: 30 November 2023 (aged 90); Jerusalem, Israel

Shlomo Avineri (Hebrew: שלמה אבינרי; born Jerzy Wiener; 20 August 1933 – 30 November 2023) was an Israeli political scientist. He was a professor of Political Science at the Hebrew University of Jerusalem and member of the Israel Academy of Sciences and Humanities. He also served as a recurring visiting professor at the Central European University in Budapest and as a fellow at Munich-based academic think tank Centrum für angewandte Politikforschung, offering advice to politicians. Avineri died on 30 November 2023 at the age of 90.

== Ideas ==
Avineri wrote extensively on the history of political philosophy, especially on the political thought of Karl Marx, Georg Wilhelm Friedrich Hegel, and on the early Zionist political theories of Moses Hess and Theodor Herzl. He also wrote numerous books and articles on Middle Eastern affairs and international affairs.

Avineri contributed in revising Hegel's political thought and showing Hegel's pluralism. Avineri was also involved in the debate over the dissolution of the Soviet Union. He argued that it was the pre-capitalist structure of 1917 Russia, as well as the strong authoritarian traditions of the Russian state and its weak civil society, that pushed the October Revolution towards its repressive development. His intellectual biography of Herzl shows how developments in his native Austro-Hungarian Empire, rather than the Dreyfus Affair in France, convinced Herzl of the failure of Jewish emancipation in Europe and of the need to find a political solution for the Jews, based on national self-determination, outside of Europe.

His work appeared in Dissent, Foreign Affairs, and The New York Review of Books. He frequently contributed op-eds to Haaretz. He was a member of the editorial board of the Jewish Review of Books. Eulogising Avineri, Colette Avital wrote: "During the last year of his life, after the 2022 elections that empowered parties of the extreme right, [he] chose to analyze that phenomenon within a broader, global context, highlighting the ongoing crises of many Western democracies. He emphasized the breakdown of traditional political parties and the rise of populist right-wing ones. Even though circumstances vary from country to country, according to [Avineri], the common denominator for their downfall was their failure to adapt to changing conditions, mass immigration, and social media, which enables populist politicians to reach the masses in a way they could not in the past."

== Positions held ==
Avineri served as director of the Eshkol Research Institute (1971–1974), dean of Faculty of Social Sciences (1974–1976), director-general of the Ministry of Foreign Affairs (1976–1977), and director of the Institute for European Studies at the Hebrew University (1997–2002).

Avineri was a visiting scholar at the Wilson Center, the Carnegie Endowment for International Peace, Brookings Institution in Washington, DC, and at the Institute of World Economics and International Relations in Moscow. He was a recurring visiting professor at the Central European University, in Budapest. He was also a veteran board member of the Israel Council on Foreign Relations.

Avineri served as Director-General of Israel's Ministry of Foreign Affairs from 1975 to 1977. He also headed the Israeli delegation to the UNESCO General Assembly, and in 1979 he was a member of the joint Egyptian-Israeli commission that negotiated the cultural and scientific agreement between the two countries. When the Rabin government appointed Avineri to the post of director-general of the Foreign Ministry in 1975, it was harshly criticized by the Likud opposition because of Avineri's support for negotiations with the Palestine Liberation Organization (PLO).

During his time at the Foreign Ministry, Avineri followed the official line of the Rabin government preferring the "Jordanian Option" and participated in some of the meetings with King Hussein. But in his writings, and internal Foreign Ministry memoranda, he tried to present the conflict with the Palestinians within a wider context of a conflict between two national movements, beyond the narrow ideological or security-oriented conventional Israeli discourse. At that time, some of the first unofficial meetings between Israeli peace activists and PLO officials also took place. These developments were curtailed by the Likud electoral victory in 1977, which also led to Avineri's resignation from the Foreign Ministry, but were resumed in the 1990s in the second government of Rabin and led to the Oslo accords between Israel and the PLO.

== Honors and awards ==
Avineri was the recipient of many honors and awards including:

- A British Council Scholarship (1961)
- The Rubin Prize in the Social Sciences (1968)
- The Naphtali Prize for the study of Hegel (1977)
- The Present Tense Award for the Study of Zionism (1982)
- The Israel Prize for political science (1996)
- The Israel Political Science Association Award for his contribution to the discipline in Israel and abroad (2006)
- A Ph.D. Honoris Causa from the University of Cluj-Napoca, Romania
- The Order of the Star of Italian Solidarity, with the rank of Commendatore, from Italian President Giorgio Napolitano (2000)
- The Solomon Bublick Award of the Hebrew University of Jerusalem (2009)
- A Ph.D. Honoris Causa from the Weizmann Institute, Rehovot (2010)
- Elected to the Israel Academy of Sciences and Humanities (2011)
- Elected to the Polish Academy of Arts and Sciences and received the EMET Prize in Political Science (2013)

== Selected publications ==
- WAR AND SLAVERY IN MORE'S "UTOPIA" (1962)
- The Social and Political Thought of Karl Marx (1968)
- Karl Marx on Colonialism and Modernization (1968)
- Israel and the Palestinians (1971)
- Hegel's Theory of the Modern State (1972)
- Marx's Socialism (1973)
- Varieties of Marxism (1977)
- The Making of Modern Zionism, New York: Basic Books 1981 - Expanded edition: New York: Basic Books 2017
- Moses Hess: Prophet of Communism and Zionism (1985)
- Arlosoroff: A Political Biography (1989)
- Communitarianism and Individualism (co-editor with Avner de Shalit) (1992)
- Europe's Century of Discontent (co-editor with Zeev Sternhell) (2003)
- Moses Hess: The Holy History of Mankind & Other Writings (2004)
- Herzl - Theodor Herzl and the Foundation of the Jewish State (2013)
- Karl Marx: Philosophy and Revolution (2019)

Hebrew and English editions of his books have been translated into French, German, Italian, Spanish, Portuguese, Polish, Hungarian, Czech, Russian and Japanese.

=== Editor and translator ===
- Historical introduction to the Hebrew edition of Theodore Herzl's Diaries
- Translated Karl Marx's early writings into Hebrew.

== See also ==
- List of Israel Prize recipients
