= Deutsch–Französische Jahrbücher =

Journal published in Paris by Karl Marx and Arnold Ruge

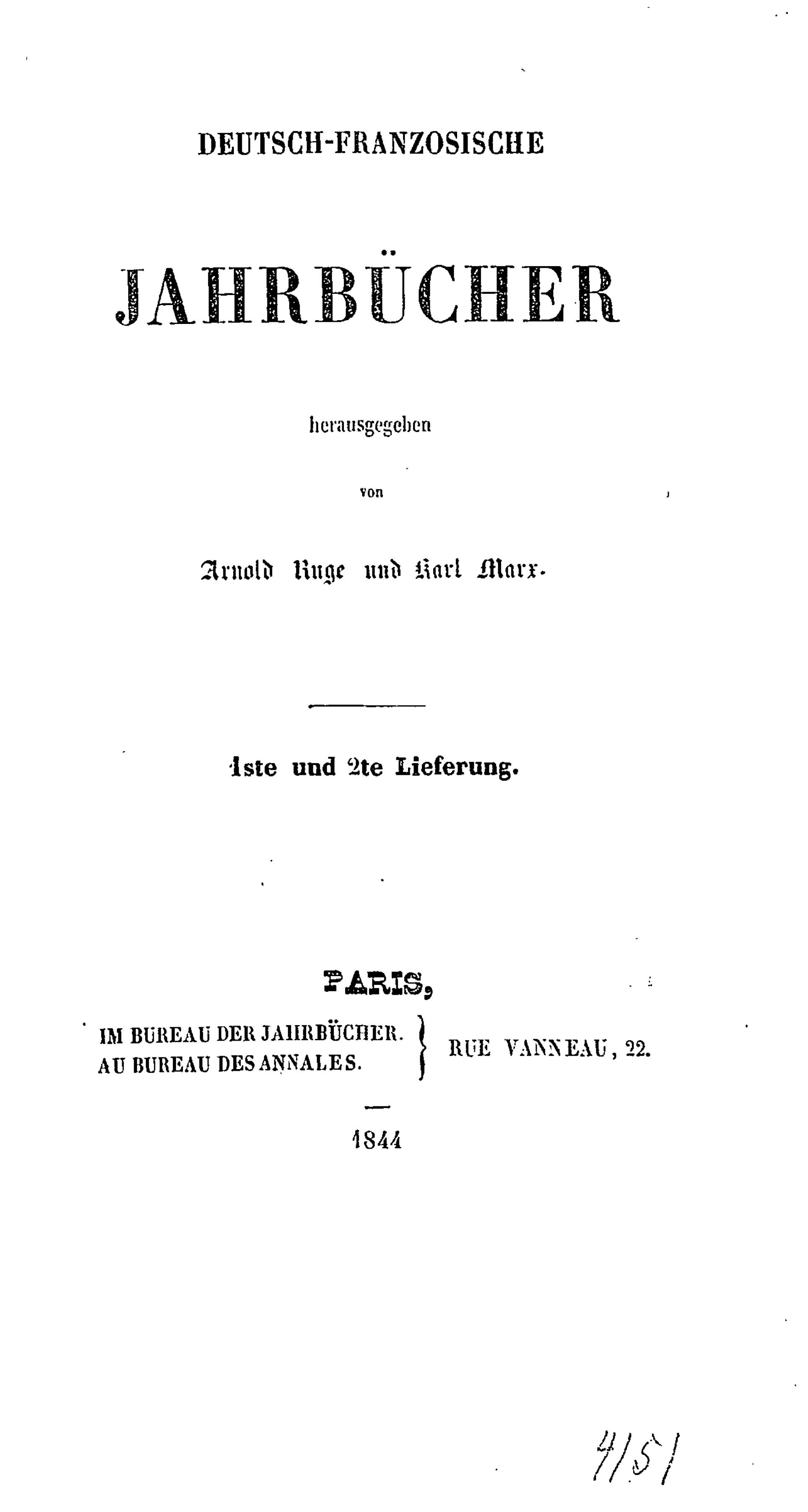
- Cover of the Deutsch–Französische Jahrbücher
- Subject: Philosophy and politics
- Language: German
- Edited by: Karl Marx and Arnold Ruge

Publication details
- History: February 1844

Standard abbreviations
- ISO 4: Dtsch.–Fr. Jahrb.

The Deutsch–Französische Jahrbücher (German–French Annals) was a journal published in Paris by Karl Marx and Arnold Ruge. It was created as a reaction to the censorship of the Rheinische Zeitung.

== History and profile ==
Deutsch–Französische Jahrbücher published only one issue, a double number, appeared in February 1844. Marx's essay On the Jewish Question and the introduction to the manuscript Critique of Hegel's Philosophy of Right were published in this issue. Friedrich Engels also submitted articles to the journal, and publication of Engels' essay "Outlines of a Critique of Political Economy" led to further correspondence between Marx and Engels.

In the months following publication, Marx was accused by the Prussian government of high treason and lèse-majesté for his writings in the Jahrbücher. The publication was discontinued because of Marx's differences in principle with Ruge and the difficulty of smuggling the periodical into Germany.

== Contents ==
The combined first and second number of the Deutsch–Französische Jahrbücher had the following content:

	Page.
* 'Plan of the deutsch-französischen Jahrbücher' by Arnold Ruge	3
* 'An exchange of letters in 1843'	17
* 'Songs of Praise for King Ludwig' by Heinrich Heine	41
* 'Judgement of the Ober-Apellations-Senate,' in the investigation conducted against Dr Johann Jacoby for high treason, lèse majesté and insolent dishonouring of the laws of the land, communicated by Dr Johann Jacoby	45
* 'Critique of Hegel's Philosophy of Right' by Karl Marx	71
* 'Outlines of a Critique of Political Economy' by Friedrich Engels in Manchester	86
* 'Letters from Paris' by Moses Hess	115
* 'Final Minutes of the Vienna Ministerial Conference of 12 June 1834,' with the introductory and concluding speech by Prince Metternich, together with a laudatory speech by Ferdinand Cœlestin Bernays	126
* 'Betrayal!' by Georg Herwegh	149
* 'The situation in England,' by Friedrich Engels in Manchester; Past and Present by Thomas Carlyle	152
* 'On the Jewish Question' by Karl Marx; 1. Bruno Bauer: The Jewish question. Braunschweig 1843.: 2. The ability of Jews and Christians to become free by Bruno Bauer. (Twenty-one sheets, p. 56-81)	182
* 'Review of newspapers'	215
