= Critique of Hegel's Philosophy of Right =

1843 manuscript written by Karl Marx

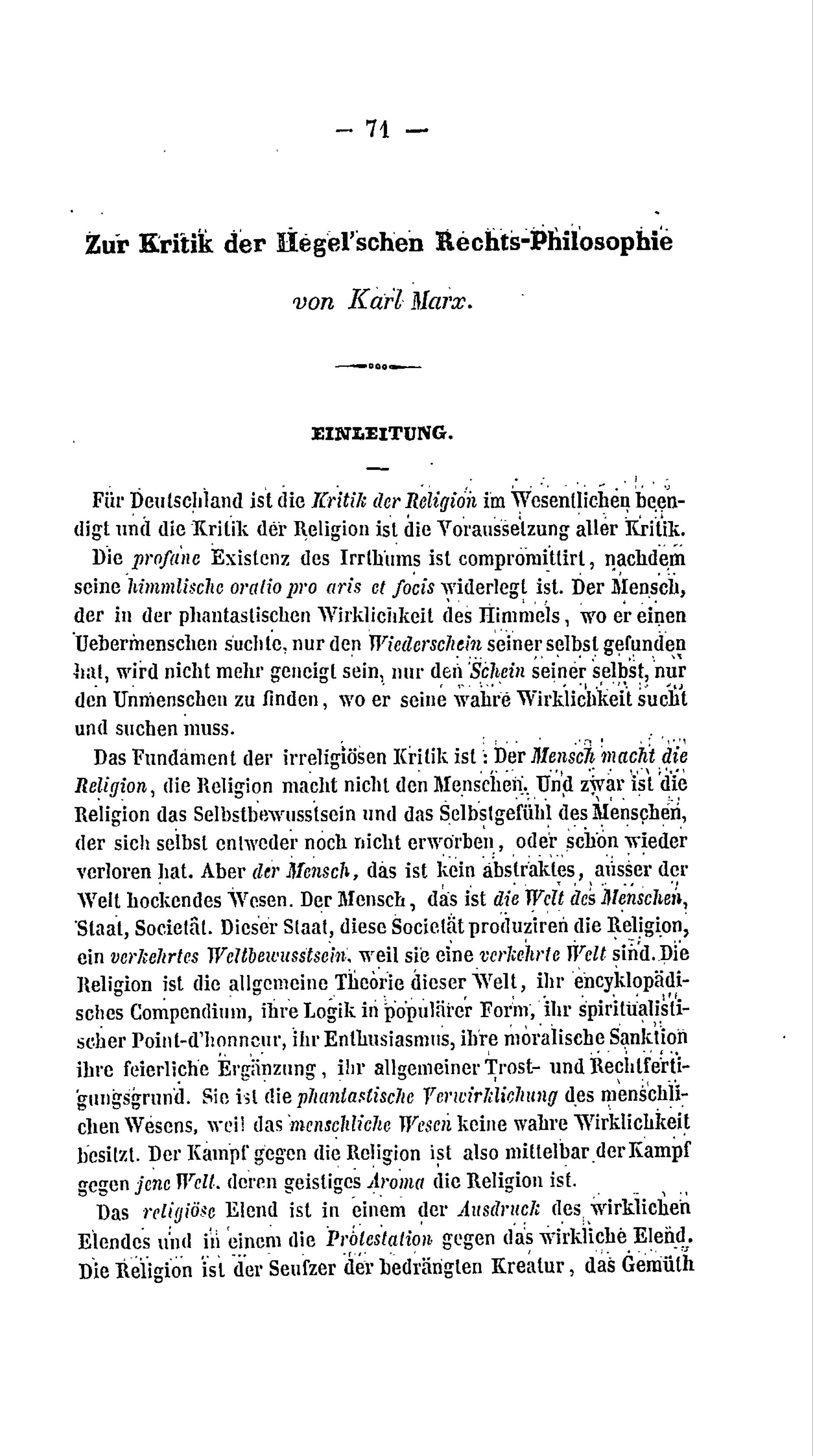
Zur Kritik der Hegelschen Rechtsphilosophie (1844, introduction)

Critique of Hegel's Philosophy of Right (German: Zur Kritik der Hegelschen Rechtsphilosophie) is a manuscript written by the German political philosopher Karl Marx in 1843 but unpublished during his lifetime—except for the introduction, published in Deutsch–Französische Jahrbücher in 1844. In the manuscript, Marx comments on excerpts of Georg Wilhelm Friedrich Hegel's 1820 book Elements of the Philosophy of Right that deal with 'civil society' and the state (Note: §§261–313) paragraph by paragraph. Narrative of the work develops around analysis of the relations between "civil society" and "political society". For Marx, the modern state, originating in Europe, is characterized by a historically unprecedented separation between an individual's "real" life in civil society from his "political" life as a citizen of the state. One of Marx's major criticisms of Hegel in the document is the fact that many of his dialectical arguments begin in abstraction.

This work contains the earliest formulation of Marx's theory of alienation, which was influenced by the writings of Ludwig Feuerbach and Bruno Bauer. The introduction also includes Marx's most famous commentary on the function of religion.

== See also ==
- Opium of the people, a phrase coined in this work
