= Leader (disambiguation) =

A leader is one who influences or leads others.

Leader may also refer to:

== Places ==
=== Municipalities ===
- Leader, Colorado, United States
- Leader, Saskatchewan, Canada

=== Rivers ===
- Leader River, New Zealand

=== Buildings ===
- Leader House, a building in Sheffield, England

== People ==
- Leader (surname)
- Gary Glitter (born 1944), a musician nicknamed "The Leader"
- Oswald Mosley (1896–1980), a British politician known to his followers as "The Leader"

== Art, entertainment, and media ==
=== Films ===
- Leader (1964 film), a Hindi film starring Dilip Kumar
- Leader (2009 film), a Sinhalese film starring Ranjan Ramanayaka
- Leader (2010 film), a Telugu film starring Rana Daggubati
- Leader: Amie Bangladesh, a 2023 Bangladeshi Bengali film featuring Shakib Khan

=== Literature ===
- The Leader, novel by Guy Walters
- "The Leader" (story), a satirical story by Radoje Domanović

=== Music ===
- Leader (orchestra), a position within an orchestra
- Leader Records (UK), a folk music record label
- Leader Records (US), a subsidiary of Kapp Records
- The Leaders, a musical group
- "Leaders", a song by Nas and Damien Marley on the album Distant Relatives
- "The Leader", a song by the Clash on the album Sandinista!
- "The Leader", a track by Johan Shevanesh from the 2014 Indian film Aal

=== Newspapers ===
==== Current newspapers ====
- Leader Community Newspapers, a series of 33 local papers in metropolitan Melbourne, Australia
- Regina Leader-Post, formerly the Leader, in Regina, Saskatchewan, Canada
- Liverpool Leader, formerly the Leader, a newspaper published in Liverpool, New South Wales, Australia
- The Leader (Angaston), a weekly newspaper published in the Barossa Valley, South Australia
- The Leader (Corning), a daily newspaper published in Corning, New York, United States
- The Leader (Flower Mound), a community newspaper published in Flower Mound, Texas, United States
- The Leader (Fredonia), a newspaper published by the State University of New York at Fredonia
- The Leader (Houston), a newspaper published in Houston, Texas
- The Leader (Utah), a newspaper published by Pioneer Newspapers in Tremonton, Utah, United States
- The Leader (Welsh newspaper), a daily paper in Wales
- The Leader, a nickname for the New Hampshire Union Leader newspaper in New Hampshire, United States
- The Leader, common name for the St George and Sutherland Shire Leader, in Southern Sydney, Australia
- Limerick Leader, in Limerick, Ireland
- The Leinster Leader, a local newspaper in Co. Kildare, Ireland

==== Former newspapers ====
- Labour Leader, a British newspaper (1888–1986)
- Lincoln County Leader (1893–1987), a weekly newspaper in Oregon, U.S.
- The Leader (Allahabad newspaper), published 1909–1967
- The Leader (English newspaper), a weekly newspaper (1850–1860) founded by G. H. Lewes
- The Leader (Welsh newspaper), a local daily newspaper in Chester, England, published 1973-2017 (also a still-ongoing website)
- The Leader (Irish newspaper), a defunct Irish newspaper founded in 1900 by D. P. Moran
- The Leader (Melbourne), a weekly newspaper in Melbourne, Australia, companion to The Age, published from the 1850s to 1935 or later
- The Leader (Orange, NSW), a defunct Australian newspaper

=== Other arts, entertainment, and media ===
- Leader (character), a fictional character from Marvel Comics
- Film leader, a length of film that aids in threading a filmstrip
- Leading article, a piece of writing intended to promote an opinion, also called an editorial
- The Leader (web series), a Chinese web series about Karl Marx

== Initiatives and organizations ==
- Leader (political party), a minor political party in Israel
- LEADER programme, a European Union initiative for rural development

== Other uses ==
- Front-runner, or leader
- Leader (dance partner)
- Leader (spark), part of an electrical spark
- Leader (typography), a row of characters (usu. dots or dashes) to connect items across a page (as in a table of contents)
- River Leader, river in Scotland
- Leader, in angling, the section of fishing line between the main line and the hook
- Leader, in architecture, a synonym for downspout
- Leader, in distributed computing, the process selected after a leader election
- Leader, an appliance sub-brand of Haier
- SR Leader class, an experimental British steam locomotive
- In engineering drawing, a leader or leader line is a thin line connecting a label or dimension with the part to which it applies

== See also ==
- Bandleader
- Orchestra leader
- Leadership (disambiguation)
- Leading (disambiguation)
- Lider (disambiguation)
- Loss leader
- Scout leader
- SR Leader class, a class of locomotive
- Team leader
- Category:Positions of authority
