= The Leader (web series) =

2019 Chinese animated web series

- Promotional poster
- Genre: Historical fiction; Biographical
- Written by: Zhong Jun
- Country of origin: China
- Original language: Mandarin Chinese
- No. of seasons: 1
- No. of episodes: 7

Production
- Running time: 25 minutes
- Production company: Wawayu

Original release
- Network: Bilibili
- Release: January 28 – March 4, 2019

The Leader (Chinese: 领风者; pinyin: Lǐng fēng zhě) is a 2019 Chinese donghua web series based on the life of German philosopher Karl Marx. Commissioned by the Chinese Communist Party, a production team was formed in 2016 which included propaganda departments, scholars of Marxism, and the Chinese Academy of Social Sciences. The series was announced in 2018 by the streaming service Bilibili as part of the celebration of the 200th anniversary of Marx's birth. The seven-episode series was created to attract young people to Marxism, and it was streamed weekly on Bilibili between January 28, and March 4, 2019. A webcomic version was produced by Zhong Jun, the series' chief scriptwriter.

The series' announcement attracted international interest, and its promotional video had over 200,000 views on its release day. The series had a mixed response; the first episode had over 2.8 million views in one day, and the series as a whole had at least 5.5 million views. Although it was criticized for poor animation, propagandism, and its depiction of Marx, it has sparked a discussion on Marxism and labor rights in China.

== Plot ==
The Leader revolves around the life of German philosopher Karl Marx, focusing on his political and economic theories, his romance with Jenny von Westphalen, and his friendship with Friedrich Engels. In a press release, Marx was described as "a great man standing upright between heaven and earth, whose ideological system established through his entire life awakened all sleeping proletariat across the world and deeply influenced the historical development of the world". He was also characterized as "an ordinary man of flesh and blood", whose love for Jenny and friendship with Engels "became legendary".

The series depicts Marx's life from his graduation from Trier High School in 1835 to his college years, where his philosophy changes from Kantianism to Hegelianism. His early affiliation with the Young Hegelians and his work on the newspaper Rheinische Zeitung are portrayed. Marx's exiles and ideological feuds with Ludwig Feuerbach, Pierre-Joseph Proudhon, and others are also shown. The poverty of his family is explored, and Marx's participation in the International Workingmen's Association and conflicts with Mikhail Bakunin are highlighted. The series ends with his death and the worldwide impact of his ideas.

== Production ==
The series was commissioned by Chinese Communist Party's Central Office for the Research and Construction of Marxist Theory, (Note: Officially "中央馬克思主義理論研究和建設工程辦公室", it is translated in several ways; some sources call it the "Project to Study and Develop the Marxist Theory", and others refer to it as the "Office for the Research and Construction of Marxist Theory", "Central Office for the Research and Construction of Marxist Theory", or "Central Marxist Theoretical Research and Construction Engineering Office".) an initiative established in 2004. The series was conceived as part of the Chinese government's celebration of the 200th anniversary of Marx's birth. A production team to develop The Leader web series and related merchandise such as emoji, stage plays, and theme songs was formed in 2016. The series was produced by the Wawayu animation studio in partnership with the Chinese Academy of Social Sciences, the CCP-owned People's Daily newspaper, the think tank Weiming Culture Media, the Inner Mongolia Film Group, the Propaganda Department of the Inner Mongolia Autonomous Region Party Committee, and the Communist Youth League Central Propaganda Department.

The series' chief scriptwriter was Zhong Jun, deputy director of the Inner Mongolia Autonomous Region Party Committee Propaganda Department and a researcher at the Chinese Academy of Social Sciences. Other scholars of Marxism were involved in the scripting, with the production team focused on accuracy rather than storytelling. The staff did not want the series to pander to the demands of the entertainment industry, where there is "no way to make very careful and precise or very accurate descriptions." Its production conformed with the Chinese Communist Party general secretary Xi Jinping's demand for people to remember China's socialist past while pursuing the "great rejuvenation of the Chinese nation" and his belief that they should be familiar with Marx, whom he called the "greatest thinker in human history". Marx was treated as "an ordinary person" by the producers, who tried to depict him as a real person rather than a "legendary god".

The series reflects government officials' belief that rigid political lectures are unattractive to a generation with easy access to a booming entertainment market. Zhuo Sina, a member of The Leader staff, said that although voluminous literature exists about Marx, none of it is "in a format that young people can accept". To fill this gap, the producers intended to convey a "positive understanding" of him and hoped that it would spark interest in his life; according to scriptwriter Zhong, the series was intended to popularize Marxism and give Marx a "new shine". The producers said that they tried to make Marx and Engels more approachable and less serious to a young audience. The target audience influenced the series' theme song, design, and plot. Its German setting went through a sinicization, and the characters were designed according to the "aesthetic preferences of young people" (described as realism).

== Broadcast ==
On December 18, 2018, the streaming platform Bilibili released a trailer and announced on the Sina Weibo social media site that it would soon stream the series. It was scheduled to begin streaming on January 28, 2019; that day, the first two episodes were released on the platform. The following episodes were released weekly on Bilibili, and the final episode was released on March 4, 2019.

A comic-book version (manhua) with the same name was created as a spin-off of the series by the production team. Written by Zhong Jun, it has been published by Zhejiang Juvenile and Children's Publishing House since January 2019. The series resumed after forty-two chapters, all of which are available on the Bilibili website.

=== Episode list ===
No.	Title	Original release date
1	"Different Youth"; Transliteration: "Bù yīyàng de qīngchūn" (Chinese: 不一样的青春)	January 28, 2019
The episode begins with Karl Marx's funeral and flashes back to Trier High School, where he is giving his graduation speech. As Jenny von Westphalen hears his words, she remembers their time together. After the speech, Jenny invites Marx to a ball. They dance together, and Marx says that he intends to go to the University of Bonn. Jenny's brother Ferdinand, who dislikes Marx's peasant background, throws Marx off the ball while she is not looking. They meet secretly, and Marx promises to marry her; he is disappointed when Jenny misses his departure for Bonn. Marx is fascinated in Bonn by Immanuel Kant's philosophy, but gets involved in bar fights and spends too much money. His father, Heinrich, forces Marx to transfer to the more serious University of Berlin to study law. Marx befriends Bruno Bauer there, and abandons Kantian philosophy in favor of Hegelianism.
2	"Defending the Rights of the People"; Transliteration: "Hànwèi zìyóu" (Chinese: 捍卫自由)	January 28, 2019
Marx joins the Young Hegelians and prepares his doctoral thesis, The Difference Between the Democritean and Epicurean Philosophy of Nature. Because of the thesis' atheist positions, Bauer suggests that Marx not submit it to the conservative professors at Berlin; instead, he receives his PhD from the University of Jena. Marx begins working for the Rheinische Zeitung and becomes a constant critic of the Prussian government; this increases the newspaper's circulation among the poor and attracts the government censors. When the censorship increases after Marx criticized a forestry law that forbade peasants from collecting wood from landowners' properties, Marx quits his job. Concluding that the state protects the ruling class, he leaves the Young Hegelians because they criticize religion instead of taking real political action. Furious with Bauer, Marx ignores Friedrich Engels' invitation to talk to him. He joins Arnold Ruge, who is also politically persecuted, and goes to France with him to establish a new newspaper. With a new salary, Marx buys an engagement ring for Jenny, who agrees to marry him, despite a furious argument with her brother.
3	"A New World View"; Transliteration: "Quánxīn de shìjièguān" (Chinese: 全新的世界观)	February 4, 2019
Marx and Jenny move to Paris after their marriage, and Marx writes articles for the Deutsch-Französische Jahrbücher newspaper. He likes an article about political economy by Engels, who is impressed by Marx's article on the critique of Hegel and his ideas about the proletariat as a revolutionary force. After a disagreement with Ruge about his lack of revolutionary ideas, Marx meets and befriends Engels. Engels shows him his manuscript for "The Condition of the Working Class in England", and introduces Marx to socialism. They begin co-authoring critiques of thinkers they perceive as confusing the proletariat. To overcome idealism, they publish The Holy Family as a critique of Bauer. After Marx is exiled to Brussels, they write The German Ideology as a critique of the Young Hegelians and Ludwig Feuerbach's materialism. Although it is not accepted by any publisher, Marx and Engels are happy to have created a materialist conception of history.
4	"Scientific Socialism Shines Brightly"; Transliteration: "Kēxué shèhuì zhǔyì shǎnyào dēngchǎng" (Chinese: 科学社会主义闪耀登场)	February 11, 2019
As working conditions deteriorate, a variety of socialist philosophies emerge. Marx and Engels advocate scientific socialism, opposing both League of the Just leader Wilhelm Weitling's Christian communism and Hermann Kriege's idea of love as a unifying factor of classes in the Communist Correspondence Committee. After writing a letter criticizing those concepts, Marx and Engels are invited to join the League. In Paris, Engels learns about Pierre-Joseph Proudhon's book The Philosophy of Poverty and his ideas of mutualism and opposition to revolutionary violence. Marx writes The Poverty of Philosophy in response to Proudhon, and Engels attends a League meeting in London. When he returns, he announces that the League has changed their name to the Communist League and he and Marx have been assigned to write their political program. They write The Communist Manifesto during the revolutions of 1848, and Marx is exiled from Belgium under suspicion of fomenting the revolution in Brussels. After a brief trip through Paris, Marx establishes the Neue Rheinische Zeitung in Cologne. The newspaper's articles annoy the German government and, after several acquittals, Marx returns to Paris in exile.
5	"Great Work: Das Kapital"; Transliteration: "'Zīběn lùn' yuè shì ér chū" (Chinese: 《资本论》越世而出)	February 18, 2019
The Marxes are exiled from Paris and emigrate to London, where they are so poor that Marx must sell his clothing to buy food. They are almost evicted, but Engels pays their rent. While the Marxes are grieving the death of their children Guido and Franziska, another son (Edgar) dies. When Marx is researching in the British Museum for A Contribution to the Critique of Political Economy, he is asked by Tom (a child laborer) why his father lost his job when there was overproduction at his coal mine. Marx explains that labor creates value, labor is exploited through surplus value, and capital has a "natural instinct" to pursue profit; workers must control the means of production to overcome this situation. Marx works on Das Kapital and elaborates his crisis theory, surviving on a legacy from his friend Wilhelm Wolff. During the twenty-year writing process, Marx struggles with his perfectionism, develops pneumonia, boils, and insomnia, and debates Carl Vogt and Proudhon followers at the First International until he publishes the first volume of his magnum opus.
6	"First International"; Transliteration: "'Dì yī guójì' fēngyún" (Chinese: "第一国际" 风云)	February 25, 2019
At the First International, some say that Marx should be its leader but he declines. He also turns down Otto von Bismarck's offer of a government job and the restoration of his citizenship. During a supportive speech about the Paris Commune Marx meets the grown-up Tom, who volunteers to fight in France and exchanges letters with him. Marx eulogizes the Commune in "The Civil War in France", describing it as the first "dictatorship of the proletariat". He becomes ill again after working to provide asylum for a French deportee, and he and Engels decide to write a new preface for The Communist Manifesto in homage to the Commune. The Austrian, Prussian, and Russian governments decide to attack the International, and Marx must deal with the anarchist ideas of Mikhail Bakunin. During the Hague Congress, he proposes that Bakunin and his followers be expelled from the International for their conspiracy in creating the Alliance of Socialist Democracy. Marx becomes well-known but declines an offer from The Atlantic for a cover story.
7	"Marx Forever"; Transliteration: "Yǒngyuǎn de mǎkèsī" (Chinese: 永远的马克思)	March 4, 2019
Marx is pleased with Capital's sales in Germany and Russia, and the bedridden Jenny shares his happiness. He and Engels are concerned about the rise of Eugen Dühring's ideas in the socialist movement, but Marx is too preoccupied with Jenny, the two remaining volumes of Capital, and studying Russia to write a critique of Dühring's work. Marx regrets not having published their Critique of the Gotha Program about Ferdinand Lassalle and the Social Democratic Workers' Party of Germany. Engels stops writing Dialectics of Nature to publish a text criticizing Dühring and clearly explaining Marx and Engels' ideas about historical materialism and political economy. Marx becomes interested in anthropology and the material culture of ancient societies, believing that family and private property probably developed into classes and nations. When Jenny dies, he cannot work and becomes ill. After the death of another of his children, (Jenny Longuet), Marx also dies. Engels complete the other two volumes of Capital during the eleven years after Marx's death. In an epilogue, Marx's legacy and his impact on the Russian and Chinese revolutions are highlighted.

== Reception ==
=== Initial reaction and viewership ===
The announcement of an animated series based on the young Karl Marx attracted international media interest. (Note: Among those who wrote about it in December 2018, were: American business publication Quartz; British newspaper The Times; Chilean television channels CNN and Tele 13; the Hong Kong-based newspaper South China Morning Post; Indian website Scroll.in; Italian magazine Esquire; Mexican newspaper El Universal and media company Televisa; New Zealand newspapers Manawatu Standard, The Nelson Mail, and The Timaru Herald; Paraguayan newspaper Última Hora; Peruvian newspaper La República and media company RPP; Philippine newspaper The Manila Times; Spanish newspaper El Confidencial and news agency EFE; and Turkish newspaper Daily Sabah) The announcement "[took] the web by storm", according to Mercedes Milligan of Animation Magazine. Its promotional video was watched 211,000 times on Bilibili and over 41,000 times on Twitter within the first 24 hours of release, and 37,000 users were following the series page for notifications of new episodes. However, some Internet users were skeptical about the series, saying that its depiction of the main characters was "too good looking to be true". Marx's handwriting was noted as much neater than it was in reality. Some students called the series "ridiculous" because "[t]he political element is too obvious", but others considered it a "really interesting experiment".

The production of a Marx series by the Chinese government was primarily thought to be a propagandistic attempt to convey its ideology to future generations. Mandy Zuo of the South China Morning Post noted that "his image has been a common feature on official propaganda throughout the year". Didi Tang wrote for The Times that the series was consistent with previous government productions, such as the television show Marx Got It Right. Tang called it an "effort by the ruling party to spark an interest in Marx among young people", when Chinese millennials are not fully satisfied with their working conditions. Milligan of Animation Magazine felt that the production was in line with the growing popularity of socialism and communism among the young, and "it was only a matter of time before this trend made inroads in animation".

When the series was announced, Rosemarie Ho of The Outline and Lorenzo Fantoni of Esquire noted the depiction of Marx and Engels' friendship and its relationship to yaoi (male homosexual-themed anime). Fantoni said that there was no hint of it, but Ho believed that the series would encourage the production of fan-made Marx–Engels yaoi. Comments were posted on Bilibili by viewers who inferred a homosexual relationship between Marx and Engels. They sparked a "critical backlash", according to Fan Shuhong of Radii China, with some users reporting the posts because they "are slander against these great thinkers".

The first episode of The Leader was watched more than 2.8 million times on its release day, and Inkstone News called it a "hit". After the premiere, 355,000 Bilibili users requested notifications of upcoming episodes. By February 2019, the series was reportedly streamed over 5.5 million times on Bilibili. The German radio station Deutschlandfunk Kultur noted that its number of views was not enough to place the series among the most popular Bilibili content, however, and Agence France-Presse considered it an unimpressive figure for a country of 1.4 billion people. (Note: Some versions of the report (in O Estado de S. Paulo, Le Figaro and Le Point) include the observation about the number of views relative to China's population, but others do not.) As the series continued, so did international interest. (Note: Among those who wrote independently about it between January and March 2019 were: Czech broadcaster Czech Television; German radio station Deutschlandfunk Kultur; Norwegian newspaper Dagbladet; and Agence France-Presse. The latter news was replicated by several media outlets, including American website Yahoo!; Brazilian newspaper O Estado de S. Paulo; AFP; Cambodian newspaper The Phnom Penh Post; Emirati newspaper Gulf Today; French newspaper Le Figaro, magazine Le Point and broadcast company Radio France Internationale; Indian newspaper The Hindu; Indonesian newspaper The Jakarta Post; Singapore-based newspaper The Straits Times; Taiwan-based newspaper Taipei Times; and Thai The Nation.)

=== Critical response and impact ===
Shanghai-based newspaper Sixth Tone reported that although the December trailer "generated buzz", the series' debut had a mixed response from Chinese viewers "who have paid more attention to Marx's high cheekbones and good looks than his theories". On the Chinese social networking website Douban, users rated it two out of five. Some called the storytelling "awkward", and others were more graphically critical. Bilibili users complained that the series was poorer in quality than Japanese anime, with some users comparing it to a PowerPoint presentation.

According to Chinese youth culture and media researcher Jeroen de Kloet of the University of Amsterdam, there was too much dialogue and too few scenes to "humanize" Marx: "It's the government lecturing young people on what Marxism is about". Christina Xu, a researcher of Chinese Internet culture, called the series "part of the push for soft power" by the Chinese government. Shanghai-based political scientist Chen Daoyin said that The Leader was "an effective way" for the Chinese government to educate a new generation about its version of Marxism since young people "will be more willing to accept Marxism if they get to know Marx as a person first". Chen concluded, "The ultimate goal is to make them recognize the party's official ideology and its legitimacy to rule".

Two pieces of Deutschlandfunk Kultur commented that Marx looked like a 19th-century hipster in the series. One of the articles also contained commentary from a Beijing-based "critical author" identified as Chen. He criticized the series because it "makes Marx seem extremely sympathetic". According to Chen, "Marx is always the picture on the wall, full-bearded", and "this image is not that popular ... they are now making a cartoon about Marx to reach young people" and change his image. The Beijing author also said that it was a way to adapt propaganda to the social media era, since "conventional propaganda methods are too old-fashioned". (Note: In the original, Chen is described as "ein kritischer Autor aus Peking, der sich Chen nennt". The translated parts include "Diese Comic-Serie lässt Marx äußerst sympathisch erscheinen"; "In unseren Köpfen ist Marx immer das Bild an der Wand"; "Dieses Image ist nicht so wahnsinnig beliebt. Deshalb machen sie über Marx jetzt einen Zeichentrickfilm, um junge Leute zu erreichen. Und damit die Propaganda auch funktioniert, verändern sie das Image des Protagonisten".) The other article reported that the series tried to make Marx look like a superhero. Sutirtho Patranobis of Hindustan Times agreed, saying that it "is an effort to make the ideologue accessible and popular among teenagers in the country".

The series has opened a space for discussion of Marxism and labor rights in China. The Jasic Incident, a labor-rights conflict involving Peking University Marxist Society students which school authorities tried to suppress, was cited ironically by users when Marx is threatened by his university in the series. Tom Hancock of the Financial Times found the depiction of Marx clashing with government censors, praising worker uprisings and demanding the abolition of private property surprising, since the Chinese government plays down the concept of class struggle in its official policy.
