= Inkstone (disambiguation) =

Inkstone most commonly refers to:

- Inkstone, a stone mortar for the grinding and containment of ink

== Media ==
- Inkstone News

== See also ==
- Instone Air Line
