= Leeder =

Leeder may refer to:

- Cyril Leeder (born 1959), president of the Ottawa Senators professional ice hockey team
- S.H. Leeder
- William George Leeder (1845-1906) was the mayor of Newcastle, Western Australia several times between 1878 and 1899.
- William Henry Leeder was an early settler in the Swan River Colony, Western Australia.

== See also ==
- Leader (disambiguation)
