= Leadership (disambiguation) =

Leadership is either:

- the practical skill of influencing or guiding others; or:
- the group of one or more people (such as "executives", "administrators" or "leaders") who attempt to exercise such a skill — a cadre of leaders

Leadership may also refer to:

- Leadership (book), a 2002 political book by Rudolph W. Giuliani
- Leadership: Six Studies in World Strategy, a 2022 political book by Henry Kissinger
- Leadership (journal), an academic journal of management studies
- Leadership (newspaper), a Nigerian daily
- "Leadership" (I Pity the Fool), a television episode
- Leadership High School, in San Francisco, California, US
- Leadership Institute at Harvard College, a Harvard College undergraduate organization

== See also ==
- Leadership Academy (disambiguation)
- Price leadership
- Vanguardism, in Leninist theory
