= Leading Creek =

Leading Creek may refer to:

- Leading Creek (Ohio) in Ohio, a tributary of the Ohio River
- Leading Creek (Little Kanawha River) in West Virginia
- Leading Creek (Tygart Valley River) in West Virginia

== See also ==
- Leading (disambiguation)
