= Bora Stanković Gymnasium, Vranje =

Bora Stanković Gymnasium Гимназија „Бора Станковић” Gimnazija „Bora Stanković”

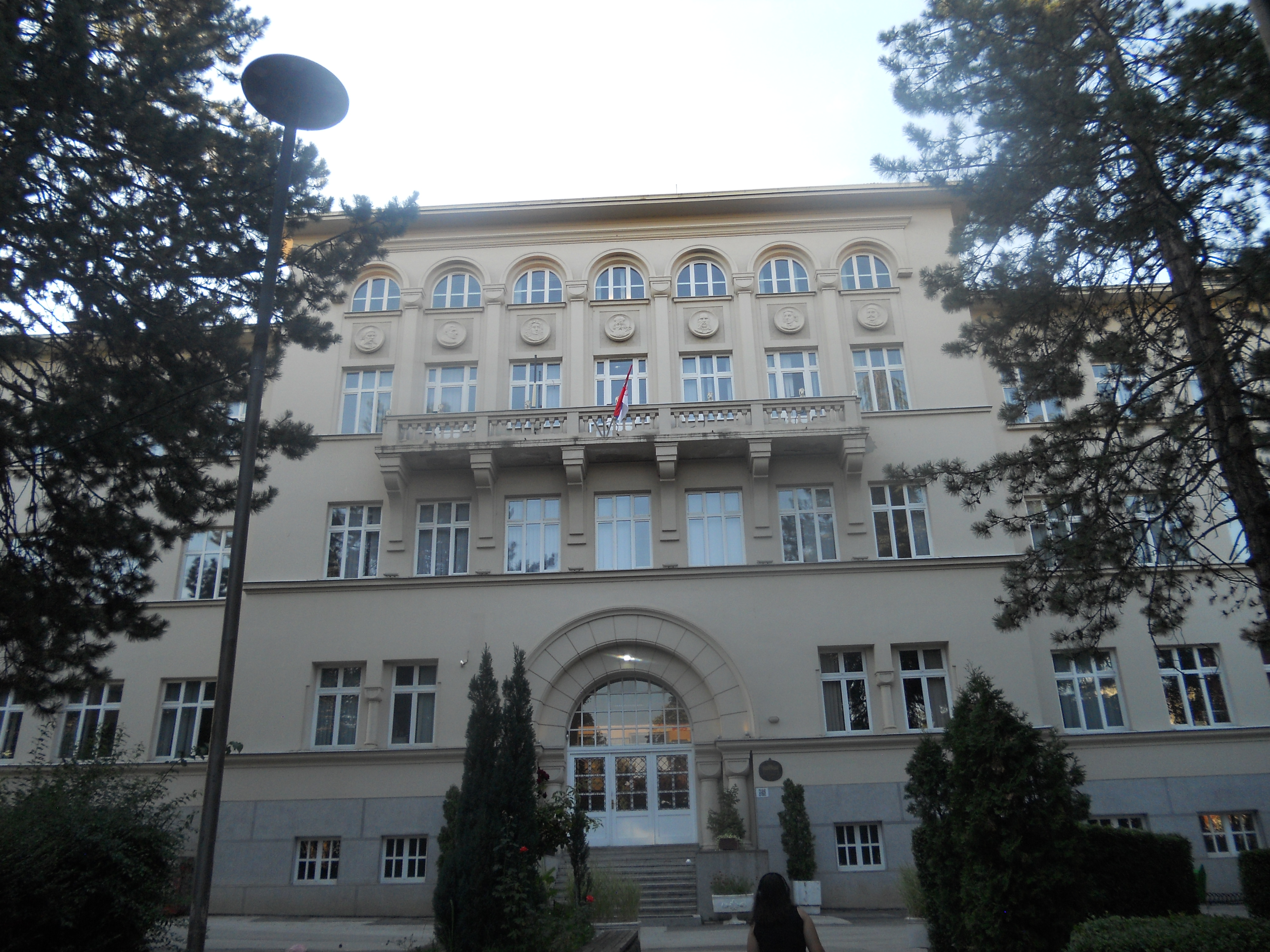

Location
- Vranje, Pčinja District; Serbia
- Coordinates: 42°33′12″N 21°53′44″E

Information
- Type: public school
- Established: 1881; 145 years ago
- Campus: Urban
- Website: www.vranjskagimnazija.edu.rs

The Bora Stanković Gymnasium (Serbian: Гимназија „Бора Станковић” Врање, Gimnazija „Bora Stanković” Vranje) is a public coeducational high school (gymnasium, similar to preparatory school) located in Vranje in southern Serbia. The school was established in 1881 as one of the first gymnasiums in Serbia, only three years after the city was liberated from the Ottoman Empire in the Battle of Vranje during the Serbian–Ottoman Wars of 1876–1878. Notable faculty members of the school include Jaša Prodanović, Radoje Domanović, Ljubomir Davidović, Ilija Vukićević, Svetislav Simić and others.

== History ==
The school began operating in Deliver-Bey's konaks, known as Pasha's konaks, where it functioned for nearly half a century. During the Bulgarian occupation of Serbia during World War I, the school was not operational. When Vranje was again occupied during World War II, the Vranje Gymnasium became the only school in Serbia to cease operations. Under the Bulgarian occupation, it was transformed into a police prison. After World War I, due to an increase in the number of students and inadequate conditions, an initiative was launched to construct a dedicated school building. Construction of the new building began in 1931, and students first entered its classrooms in September 1933. The placement of the seven busts—Vuk Stefanović Karadžić, Borisav Stanković, Ivan Gundulić, Saint Sava, Ivan Mažuranić, France Prešeren, and Petar Petrović Njegoš—on the facade of the Vranje Gymnasium reflects the spirit of the newly established Kingdom of Yugoslavia, which sought to foster a sense of shared identity and cultural unity among South Slavs. In 1959, the school was officially named "Bora Stanković" after Borislav Stanković, but it is still commonly referred to by locals as the Vranje Gymnasium.
