= Leadership Academy =

Leadership Academy can refer to:

- African Leadership Academy
- China Executive Leadership Academy in Pudong
- Community Leadership Academy (Tallahassee, Florida, U.S.)
- Leadership Academy West
- Los Angeles Leadership Academy
- New York City Leadership Academy
- Oprah Winfrey Leadership Academy for Girls (South Africa)
- Science Leadership Academy
