= Lincoln Heights, Los Angeles =

Lincoln Heights
- Neighborhood of Los Angeles
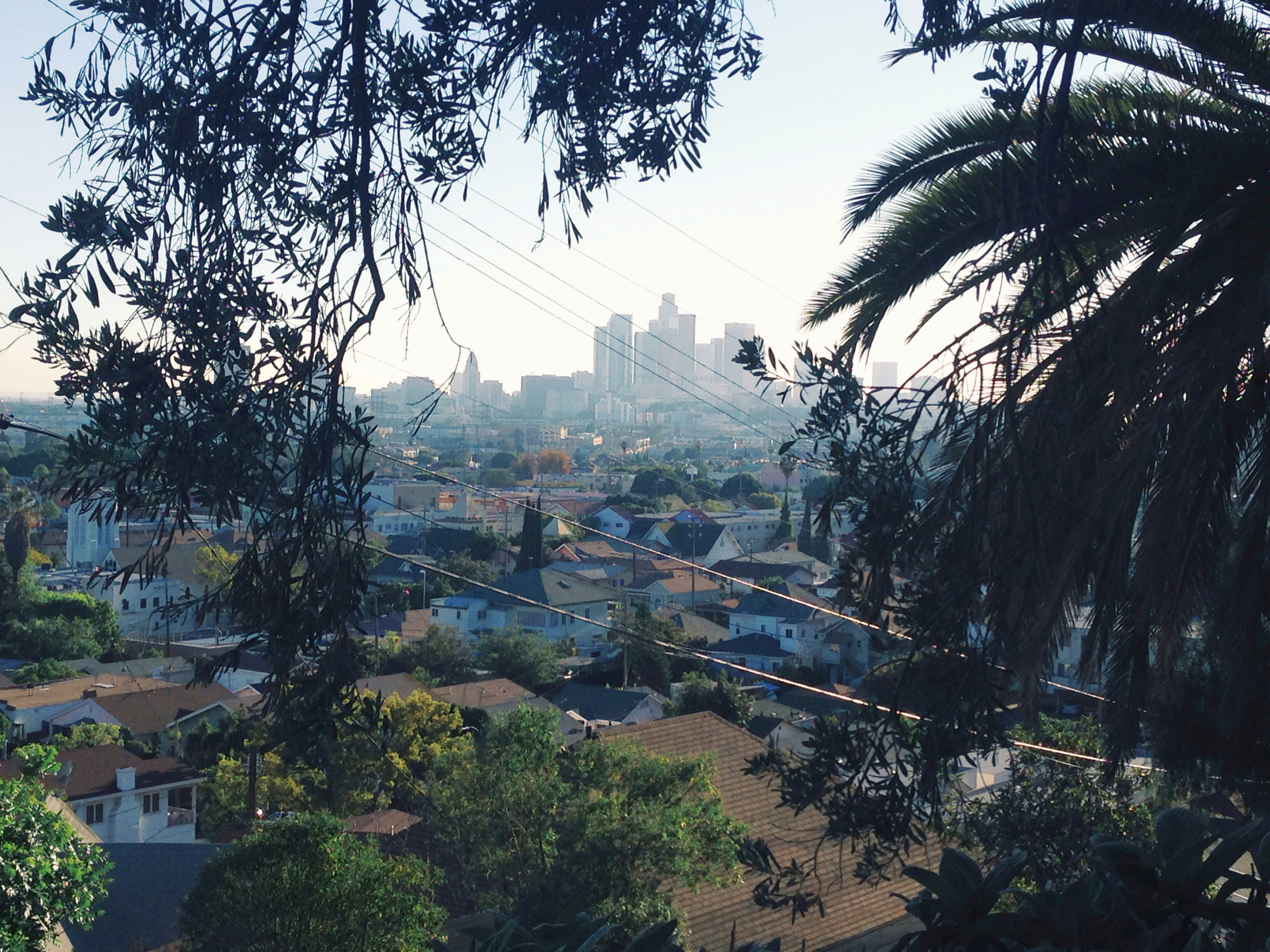
- View of Lincoln Heights and Downtown Los Angeles from the Repetto Hills

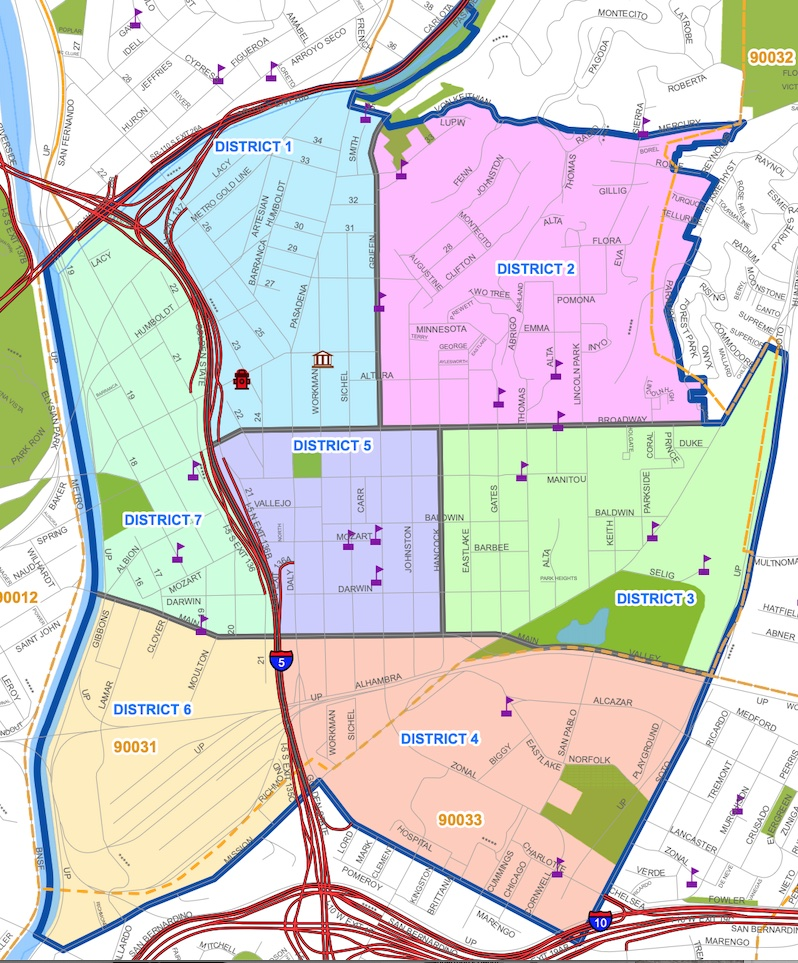
- Lincoln Heights boundary map

- Location within Central Los Angeles
- Coordinates: 34.073597°N 118.209627°W
- Country: United States
- State: California
- County: Los Angeles
- City: Los Angeles
- Time zone: UTC-8 (PST)
  - Summer (DST): UTC-7 (PDT)
- ZIP code: 90031
- Area codes: 323, 213, etc

Lincoln Heights is a neighborhood in the Eastside of Los Angeles, California, United States, located east of the Los Angeles River. It is one of the city's oldest neighborhoods and was called "East Los Angeles" from 1873 to 1917. It is a densely populated, mostly Latino and Asian neighborhood that includes many historic landmarks and was once nicknamed "the Bedroom of the Pueblo".

== History ==
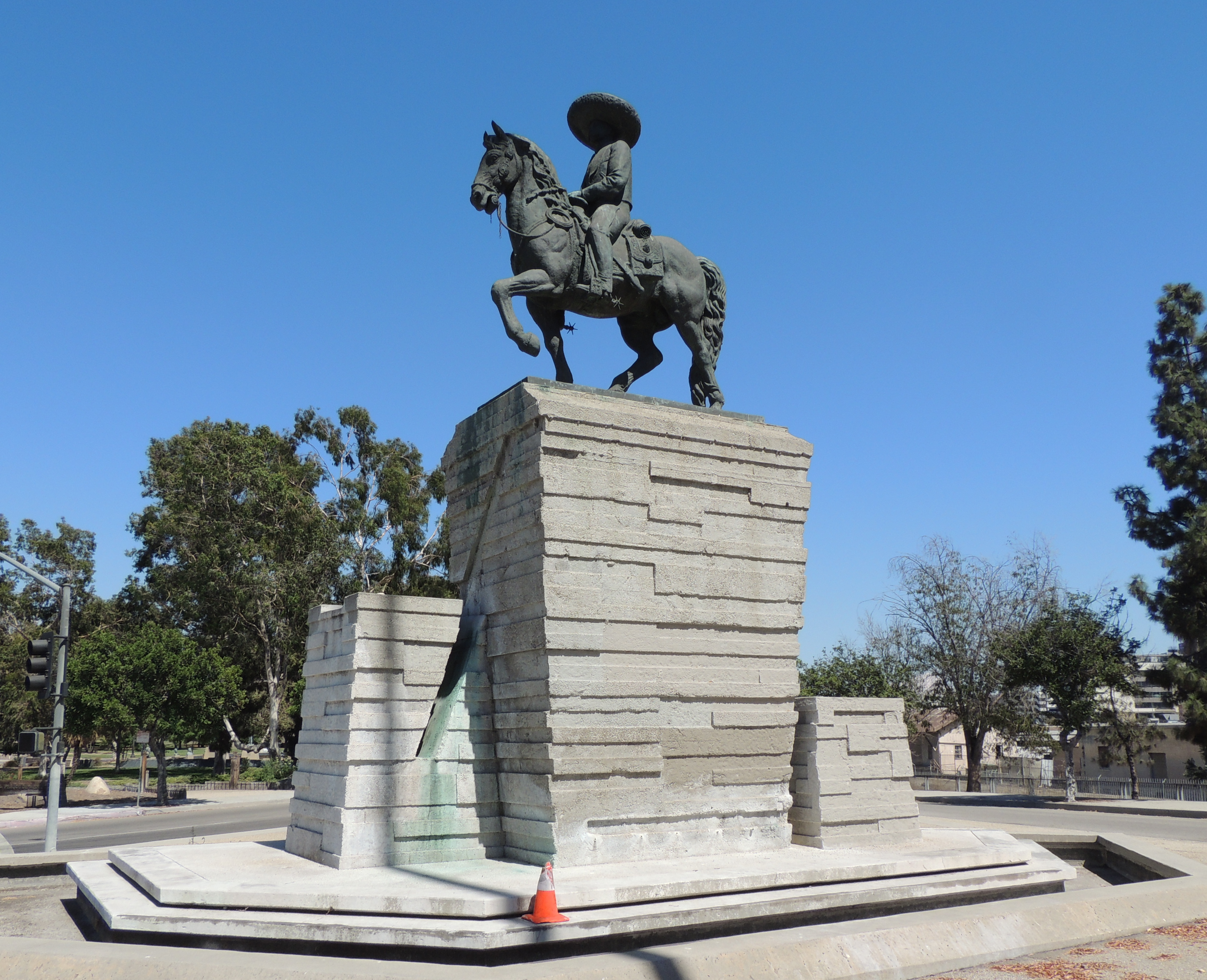
The Equestrian statue of Emiliano Zapata in Lincoln Park.

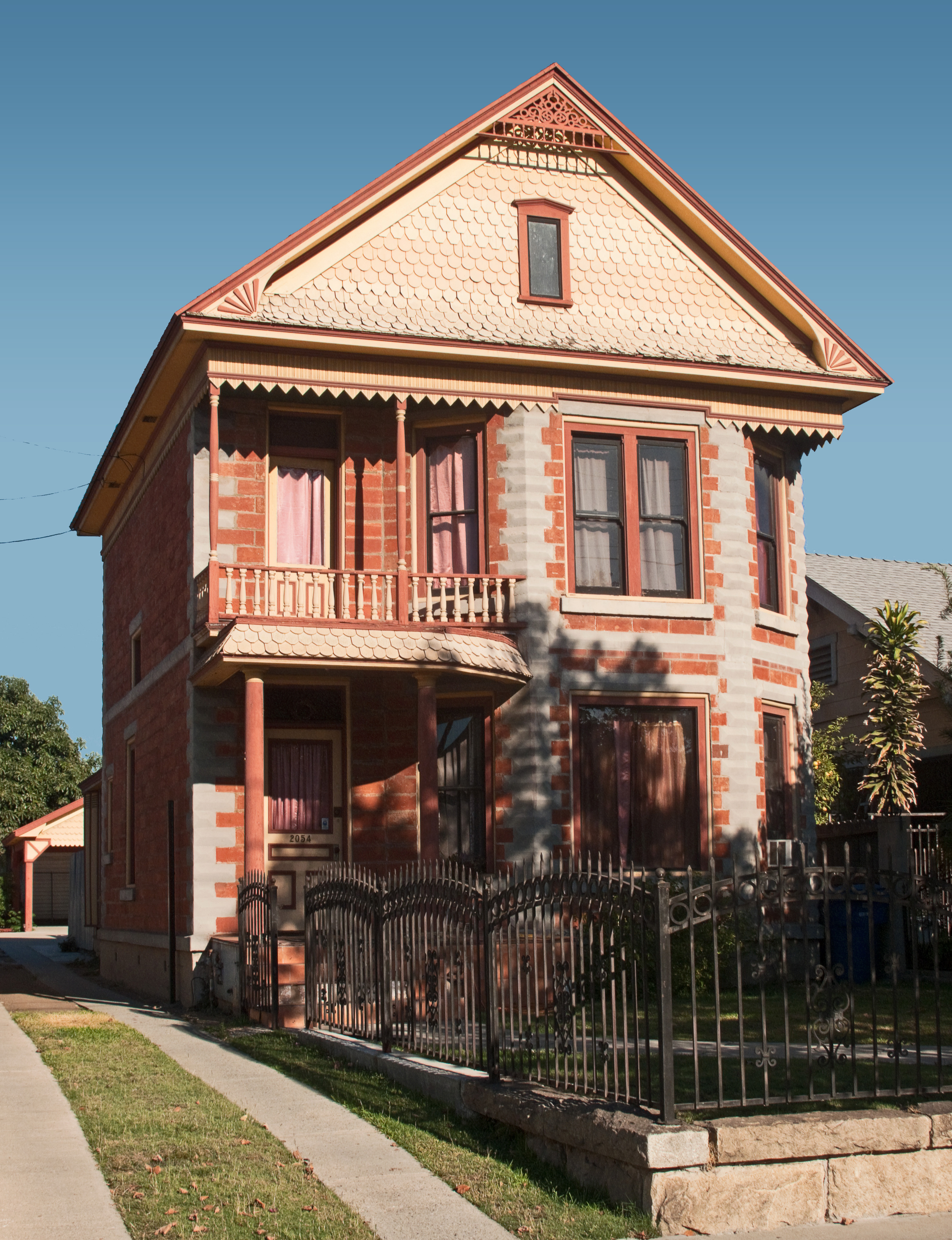
Historic home on Griffin Avenue

Yaangna Village was located on what is now the current day site of Downey Park on Albion and Avenue 17. Lincoln Heights is considered to be one of the oldest neighborhoods outside of La Placita / Sonoratown dating to the 1870s and is found wholly within the original Spanish four leagues pueblo of the Los Angeles land grant. Located on bluffs overlooking the Los Angeles River and immersed in the floodplain, Lincoln Heights river adjacent land became the city's first Industrial Corridor. Aided by slave labor of the Kizh, it later became the home to some of the city's most notable downtown industrialists, who built numerous Victorian homes, some of which have been preserved under the city's historic preservation ordinance.

In 1863, John Strother Griffin purchased 2,000 acres (810 ha) of ranch land for $1,000 and in 1870, Griffin and his nephew, Hancock Johnson, built homes there. In late 1874, they offered an additional 35 acres (14 ha) for sale, subdivided into 65 by 165 foot (20 by 50 m) lots for $150 each. The neighborhood was known as "East Los Angeles" between 1873 and 1917 when residents voted to change the name to Lincoln Heights.

The area was the first suburban neighborhood of Los Angeles, having been subdivided in 1873. Lincoln Heights was well located to serve as a home for people who worked in the industrial areas lining the Los Angeles River and wanted to live upstream. By the late 1880s a neighborhood commercial district had been built around the intersection of North Broadway and Truman Streets, with business buildings such as the Hayden Block. This is identified as the first suburban neighborhood shopping district in Los Angeles; it was demolished in the mid-20th century to make way for I-5, the Golden State Freeway.

Thereafter, what would be known as North Broadway became a crowded commercial thoroughfare, and by the turn of the 20th century, unfettered industrial construction and numerous rock crushing operations within the once scenic floodplain made it less appealing for Angelenos of means, who moved out first to the Arroyo Seco area and Hollywood, then (from the 1920s onward) to rapidly developing Mid-Wilshire. As wealthy residents departed, Lincoln Heights became home to a large Italian American population, as well as some Irish American and French American (the 1850s era immigration) residents by the 1930s, also a wave of poor white American residents known as "Okies" from the Great Plains moved into the area. With an increasingly large Mexican American population, Lincoln Heights became a barrio by the 1960s. It and its cross-river neighbor "Little Italy" (what is now Chinatown) formed the heart of southern California's Italian-American community.

== Demographics ==
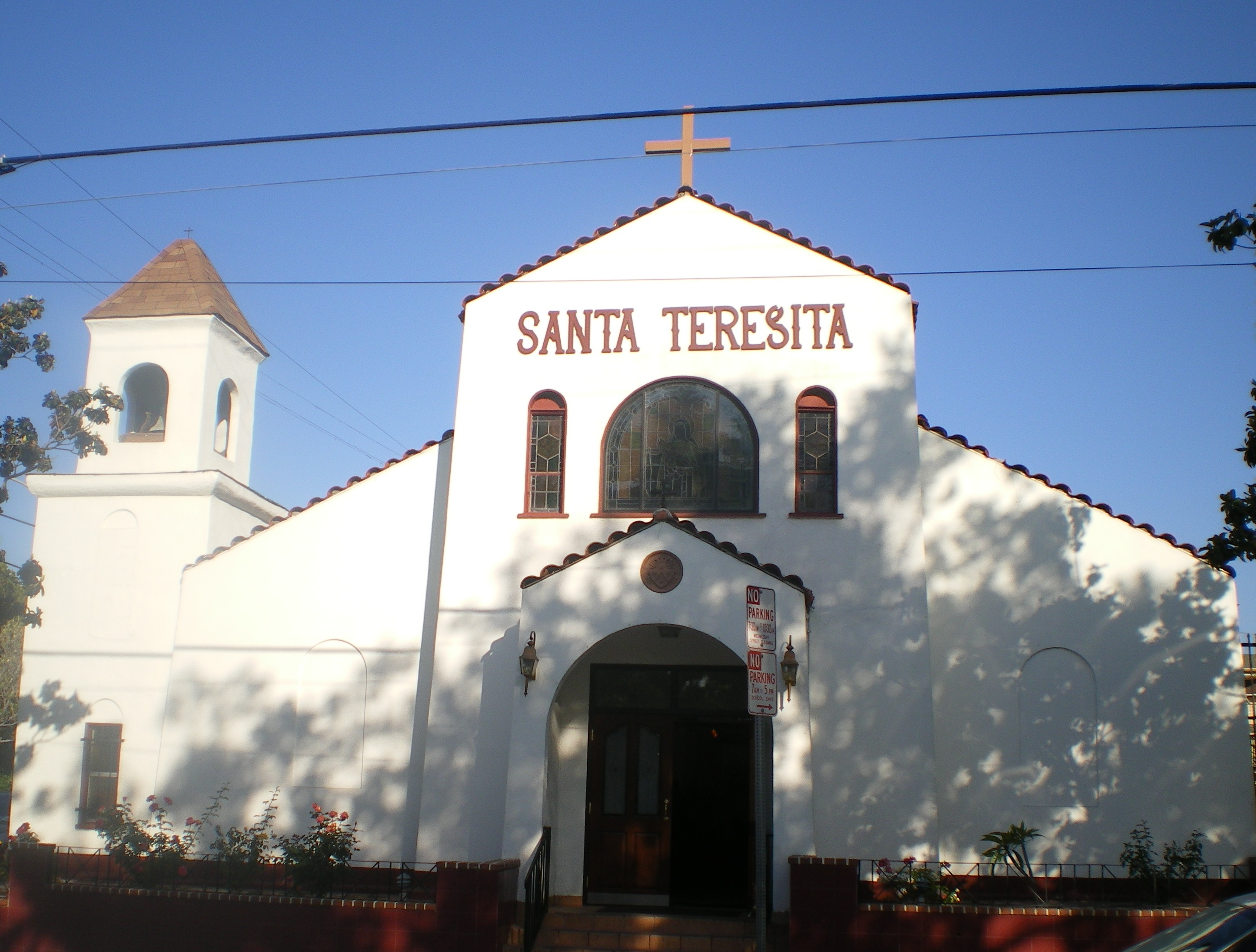
Santa Teresita Catholic Church.

Based on the 2019 Census estimates, Lincoln Heights has a population of 39,916 residents.

The neighborhood has a relatively high percentage of both Latino and Asian residents. The breakdown was Latinos, 66.2%; Asians, 23.4%; Whites, 7.8%; Blacks, 0.4%; and others, 1.0%. Mexico (57.0%) and Vietnam (16.9%) were the most common places of birth for the 55.8% of the residents who were born abroad—which was a high percentage for Los Angeles.

The median yearly household income in 2008 dollars was $30,579, considered low for the city. Renters occupied 75.9% of the housing stock, and house- or apartment-owners held 24.1%. The average household size of 3.6 people was considered high for Los Angeles.

The percentages of never-married men (53.0%) and women (40.6%) were among the county's highest. The 19.5% of families headed by single parents was considered about average for city neighborhoods. There were 500 veterans, or 2.8% of the population, a low proportion compared to the rest of the city.

Lincoln Heights ranks in the 94th-100th percentile of environmentally burdened communities according to CalEnviroScreen 4.0

=== Homelessness ===
In 2022, Los Angeles Homeless Services Authority's Greater Los Angeles Homeless Count counted 531 homeless individuals in Lincoln Heights.

Homeless population
Year	Pop.	±%
2016	96	—
2017	205	+113.5%
2018	216	+5.4%
2019	277	+28.2%
2020	280	+1.1%
2022	531	+89.6%
Source: Greater Los Angeles Homeless Count; Los Angeles Homeless Services Authority

== Arts and culture ==
=== Public libraries ===
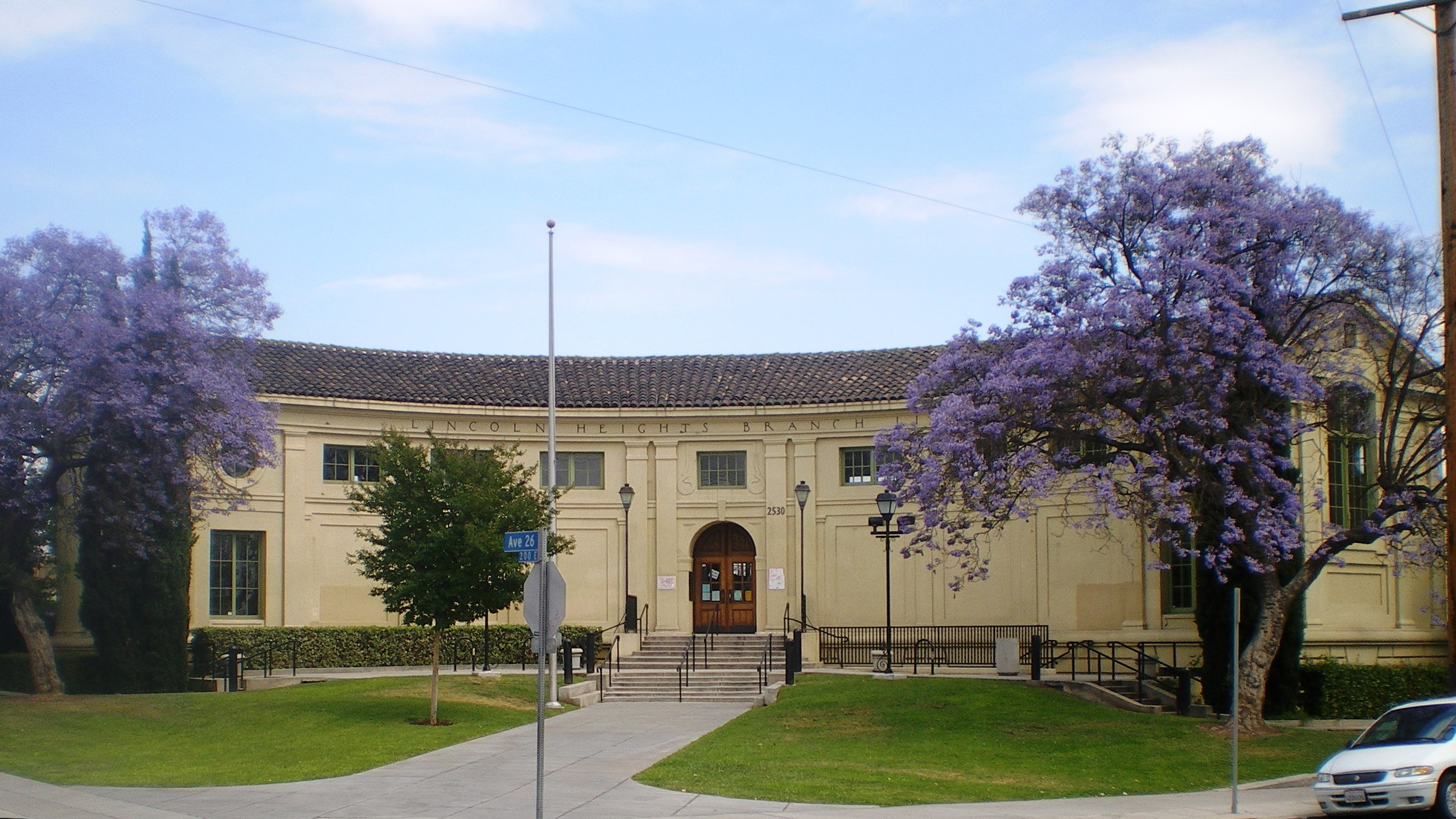
Lincoln Heights Branch Library

The Lincoln Heights Branch of the Los Angeles Public Library is on Workman Street.

=== Landmarks ===
- San Antonio Winery, (founded 1917), oldest operating business in Lincoln Heights
- Los Angeles Alligator Farm
- Selig Polyscope Company
- The Brewery Art Colony
- Church of the Epiphany, oldest operating Episcopal church in Los Angeles; Cesar Chavez gave speeches in the church hall and La Raza was printed in the church basement
- Lincoln Heights Jail
- Heritage Square Museum
- HM157

== Parks and recreation ==
- Lincoln Park
- Ela Park

== Education ==
Just 5.5% of Lincoln Heights residents aged 25 and older had earned a four-year degree by 2000, a low percentage for the city.

=== Schools ===
==== Public ====
- Abraham Lincoln High School, 3501 North Broadway
- Academy of Environmental & Social Policy (ESP) at Lincoln High, 3501 North Broadway
- Hillside Elementary School, 120 East Avenue 35
- Alliance College-Ready Middle Academy No. 5, charter, 2635 Pasadena Avenue
- Pueblo de Los Angeles Continuation School, 2506 Alta Street
- Gates Street Elementary School, 3333 Manitou Avenue
- Albion Street Elementary School, 322 South Avenue 18
- Griffin Avenue Elementary School, 2025 Griffin Avenue
- Milagro Charter Elementary School, 1855 North Main Street
- Los Angeles Leadership Academy High School (LALA HS), 234 W Avenue 33
- Alliance College Ready Middle Academy #5 (ACRMA #5)
- Alliance Susan & Eric Smidt Technology High School
- East Los Angeles Skill Center (Adult Education), 3921 Selig Place

PUC Schools operates the Milagro Charter School (K-5) and the Excel Charter Academy (6-8) in Lincoln Heights.

==== Private ====
- Little Flower Missionary House, elementary, 2434 Gates Street (closed August 31, 2017).
- Sacred Heart High School, 2111 Griffin Avenue
- Sacred Heart Elementary School, 2109 Sichel Street

== Infrastructure ==
=== Transportation ===
Major thoroughfares include Valley Boulevard; Mission Road; Pasadena Avenue; North Main, Marengo, Daly, and Figueroa Streets; and North Broadway. The Golden State Freeway (I-5) runs through the district, and the Metro A Line has a station in the far northwestern portion of the neighborhood.

=== Fire services ===
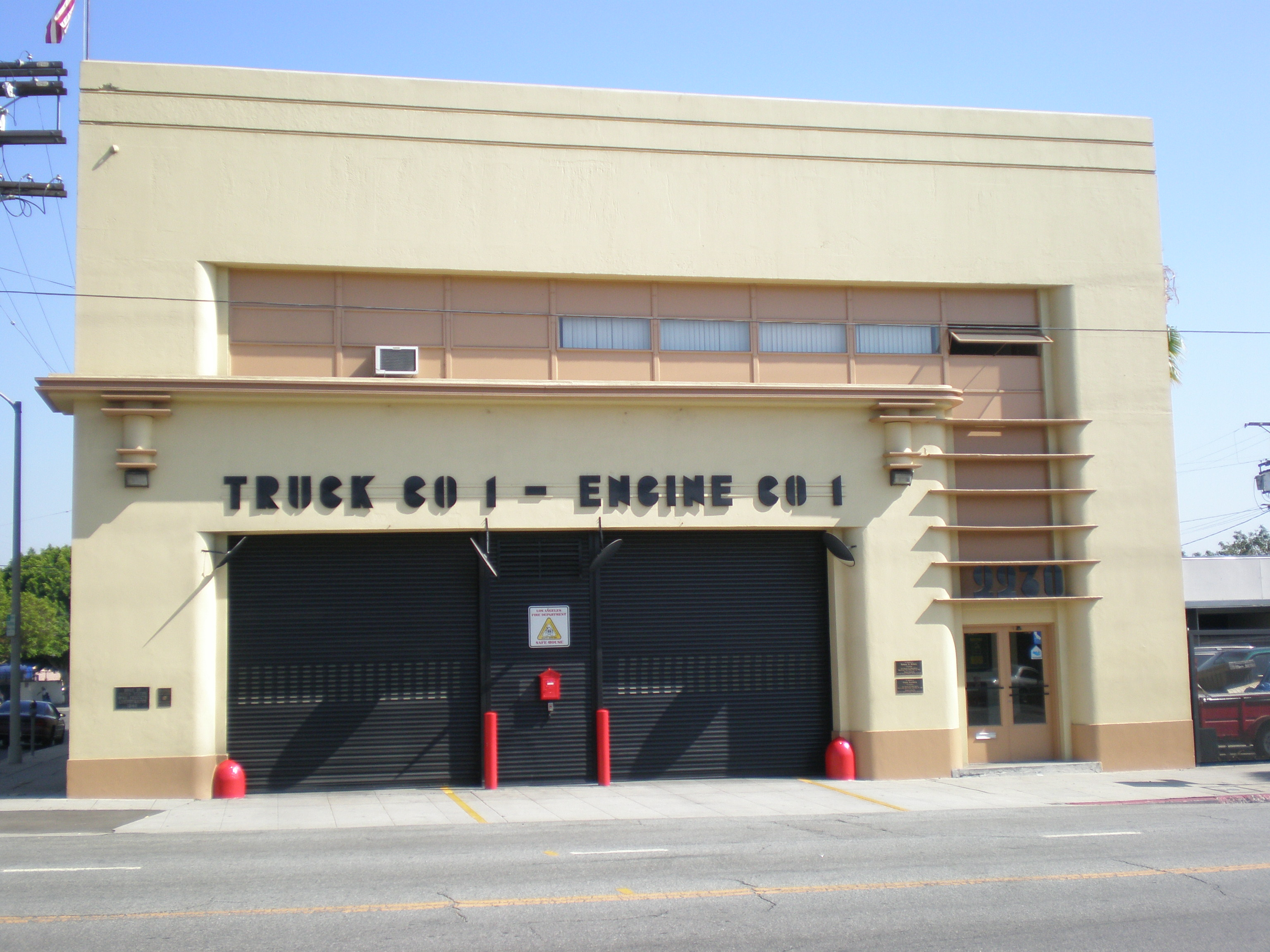
LAFD Fire Station No. 1

Los Angeles Fire Department Fire Station No. 1 is located in the Lincoln Heights area. The station is in the Battalion 2 district.

=== Healthcare ===
The Los Angeles County Department of Public Health operates the Central Health Center in Downtown Los Angeles, serving Lincoln Heights.

== Notable people ==
- Frank Capra, film director
- John Strother Griffin, the founder of East Los Angeles
- Kenny Washington, football player
- Cesar Chavez, during the "No on 22" campaign in November 1972, he temporarily resided in Lincoln Heights at a private residence on corner of Workman and Baldwin streets
- Daniel Lewis James, author
- Eldridge Cleaver, Black Panther Party's Minister of Information
- Gregory Ain, architect

== In popular culture ==
- A Nightmare on Elm Street (1984)
- Lincoln Heights (2007-2010)

== See also ==
- Los Angeles Historic-Cultural Monuments on the East and Northeast Sides
