= Leading (disambiguation) =

Leading is the amount of added vertical spacing between lines of type.

Leading may also refer to:

- Leading actor, the actor who plays the role of the protagonist in a film or play
- Leading Comics, a comic book published by what is now DC Comics during the 1940s and early 1950s
- Leading question, a question that suggests the answer or contains the information for which the examiner is searching in common law systems
- Leading-tone, a note resolves to a note one semitone higher or lower in music theory
- Voice leading, a decision-making consideration when arranging voices in musical composition
- Leadership, an ability to lead
- Leading (podcast), a podcast hosted by Alastair Campbell and Rory Stewart

== See also ==
- Leading Creek (disambiguation)
- Lead (disambiguation)
- Leader (disambiguation)
