= Historical monument One Fifty-Seven (HM157) =

Historical Monument 157
- HM157
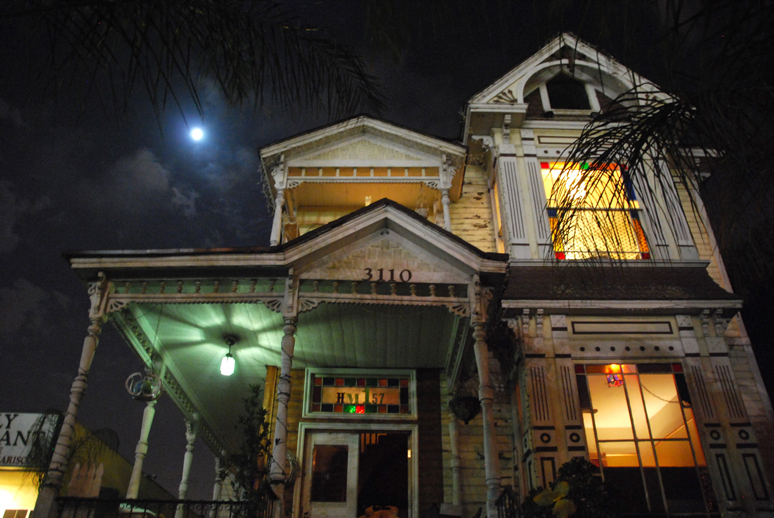
- Exterior shot of HM157
- Interactive map of Historical Monument 157
- Location: 3110 N. Broadway, Lincoln Heights, Los Angeles, California
- Coordinates: 34.0736°N 118.2087°W

Website
- https://www.instagram.com/historicalmonument157_official/

Historical Monument # 157, popularly known as HM157, is an 1886 Victorian house in Lincoln Heights, Los Angeles, also called the Horace P. Dibble House, that is on the California Historical landmark list. Established as a DIY art and music venue in 2007, HM157 became the center of the Lincoln Heights art community in LA, operating as a catalyst for arts and culture.

== Horace Dibble ==
There is some dispute among historians as to whether or not the house was owned by a Horace P. or a Horace B. Dibble. Horace P. seems to be apocryphal; but the Los Angeles Daily Times of 19 June 1896 describes a murder that took place the previous day in which salesman Horace B. Dibble killed his co-worker James Wallace at the Pacific Coast Tinware and Crockery Company after a heated argument during which Wallace attacked Dibble with a hammer. Later on that morning when, after more heated arguments, Wallace attacked Dibble again, Dibble "plunged a long, keen-bladed knife, over six inches long, into Wallace's left side, clear to the hilt [...] again and again into Wallace's side, each thrust burying the blade to the handle." The newspaper report goes on to identify Horace B. Dibble as living with his wife at "No. 110 Downey Avenue" - the same address now known as 3110 N. Broadway.

On 23 October 1896 the Los Angeles Daily Times published a story on Dibble's acquittal entitled "Dibble goes Free. Justice Morrison Decides Wallace's Killing Was Justifiable."

The murder case appears to be Dibble's only claim to fame; the anonymous Times reporter states merely that "Dibble [had] lived in Los Angeles for nearly twenty-five years" and that he was "well-known and very popular."

== HM157 ==
HM157 used to function as a music venue, gallery, multi-purpose art work space, farm, and location for public and private events, film/video/photo shoots, cinema screenings, eco-workshops, lectures & fundraisers. Some of the concerts put on at this venue have included artists like Jeffertitti's Nile, White Magic, Miranda Lee Richards, Tara Jane O'Neil, Entrance Band, Stony Sugarskull and more.

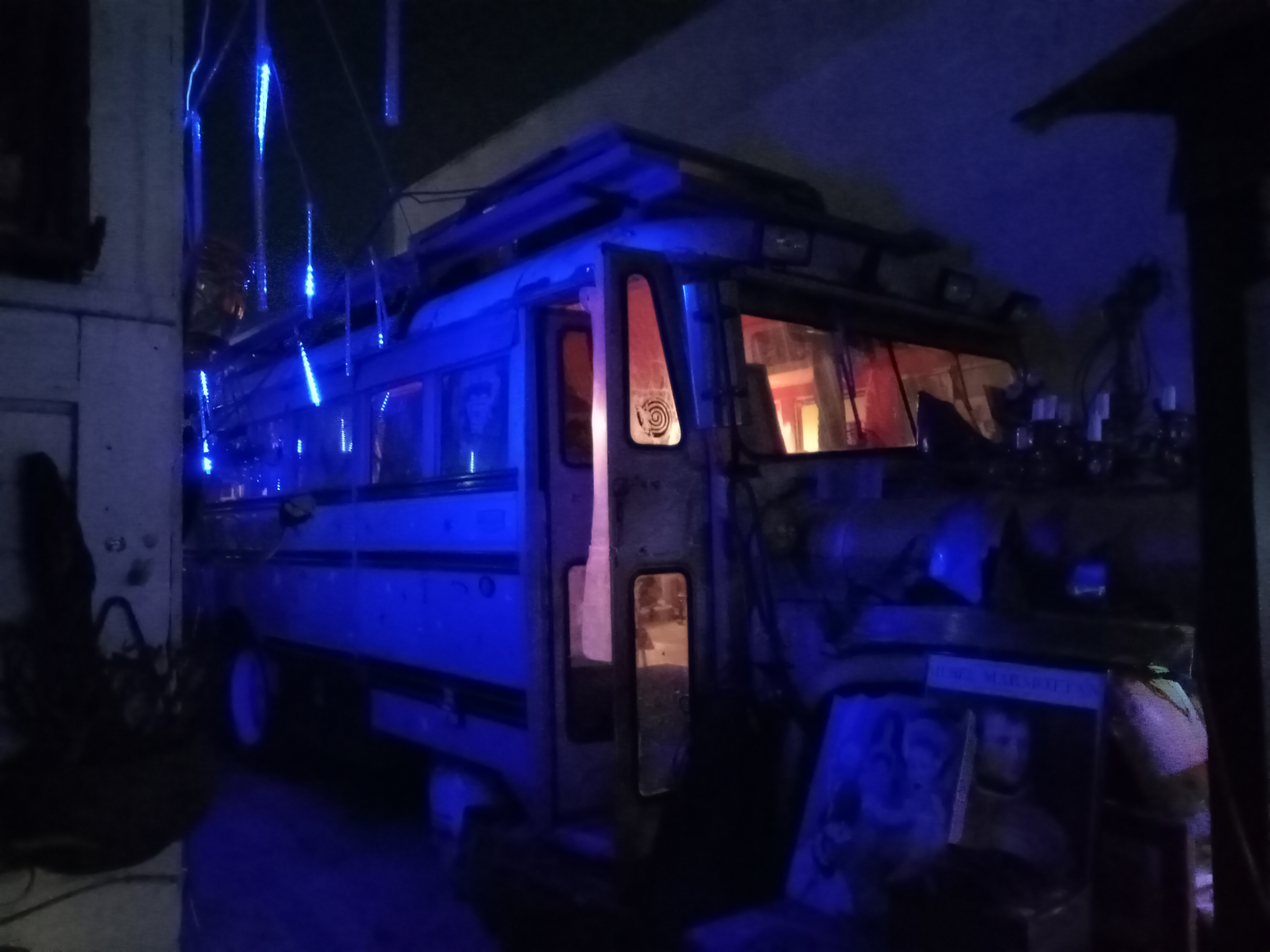
HM157, 3110 N. Broadway, Los Angeles, California. School bus. One of the available backyard spaces for events and film/video/photography shoots.

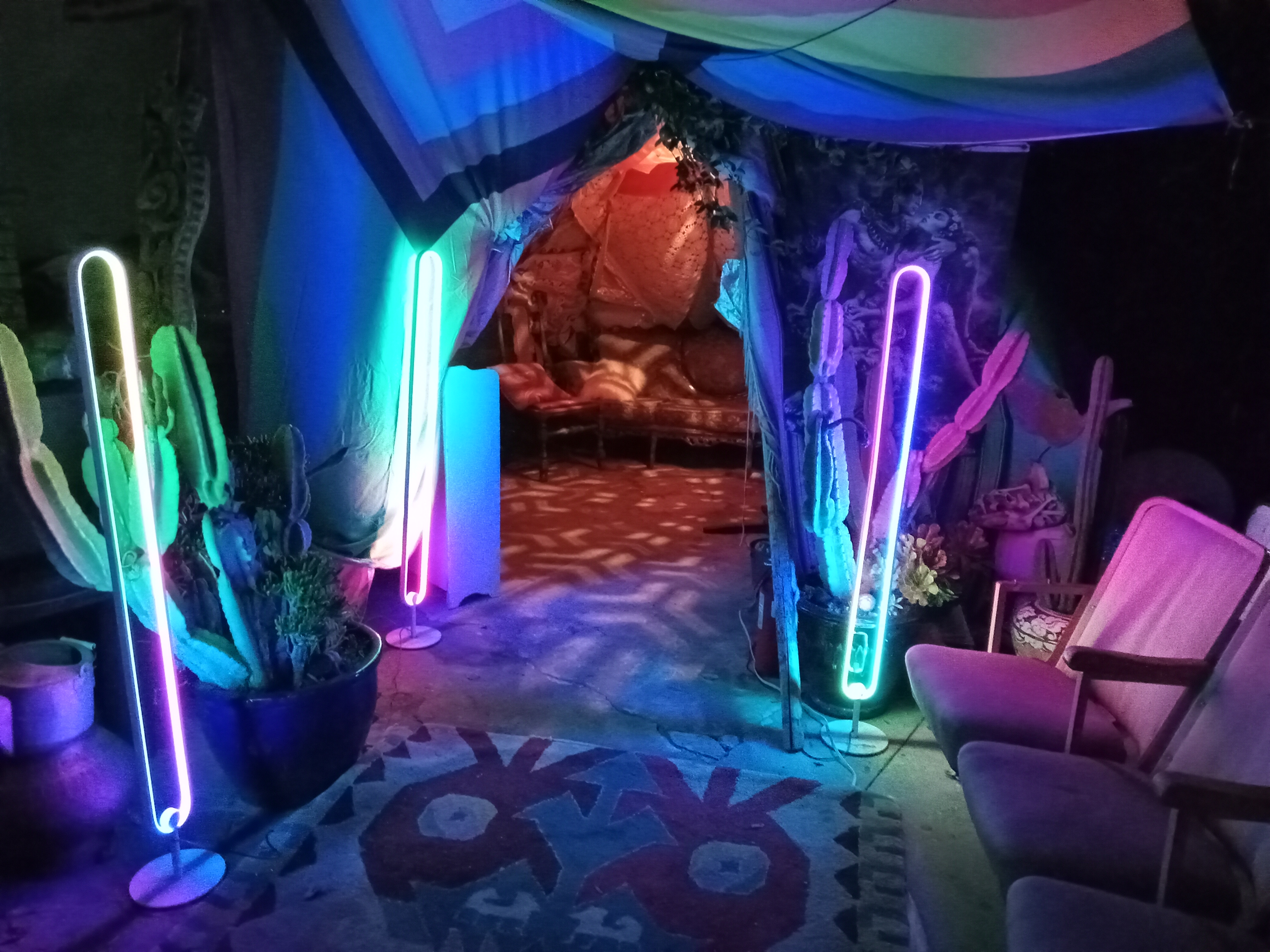
HM157, 3110 N. Broadway, Los Angeles, California. Backyard cozy space. One of the available backyard spaces for events and film/video/photography shoots.

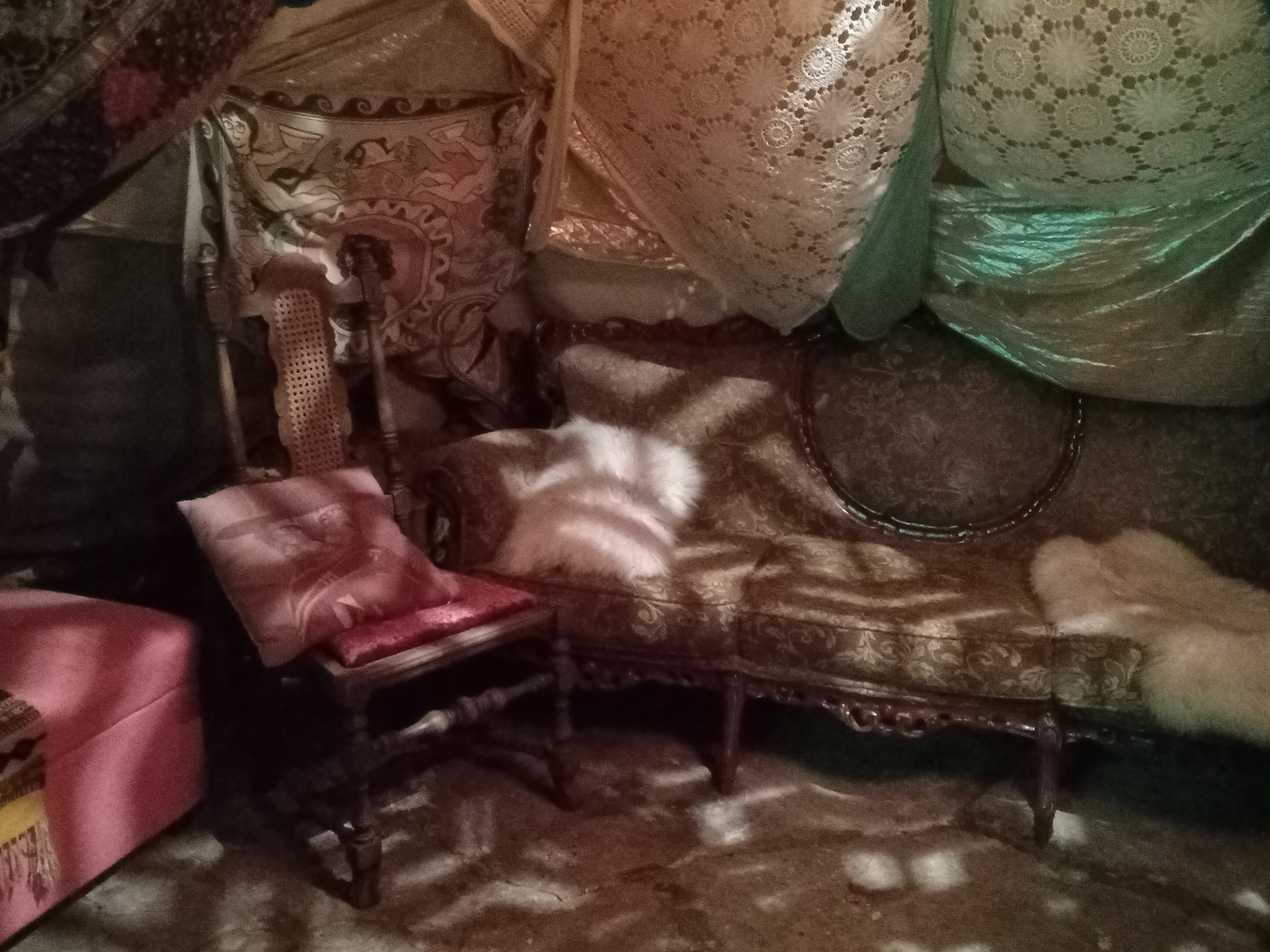
HM157, 3110 N. Broadway, Los Angeles, California. Backyard cozy space, detail. Another of the several available backyard spaces for events and film/video/photography shoots.

HM157 was consistently cited as being one of the most interesting "underground" venues in L.A.'s vibrant arts and music scene: it was voted "Best Underground Date Night 2009" and "Best Escape From Corporate Entertainment 2010" by LA Weekly. In 2012, Los Angeles Magazine described HM157 as consistently being "L.A.’s most interesting house party" and as "[r]ecompense for every obnoxious, overpriced club you’ve ever been to."; in 2014, Los Angeles public television station KCET described HM157 as "Lincoln Heights' Home for Underground Arts"

== May 2015 fire ==
On May 1, 2015 a fire broke out in the backyard performance area of HM157, destroying it and damaging the house itself and two neighboring buildings; two residents of the house lost "everything" in the blaze. In the following weeks, the members of the HM157 collective and supporters came together to help clean up the damage and begin the hard work of rebuilding what had been destroyed. A GoFundMe page was organized and raised thousands of dollars to help rebuild. HM157 was able to keep on functioning despite the fire, only having to cancel two shows that had been scheduled for the following days. Since then, as of 2020, HM157 does not operate as a venue and no longer does events.
