= Stradija =

Serbian newspaper

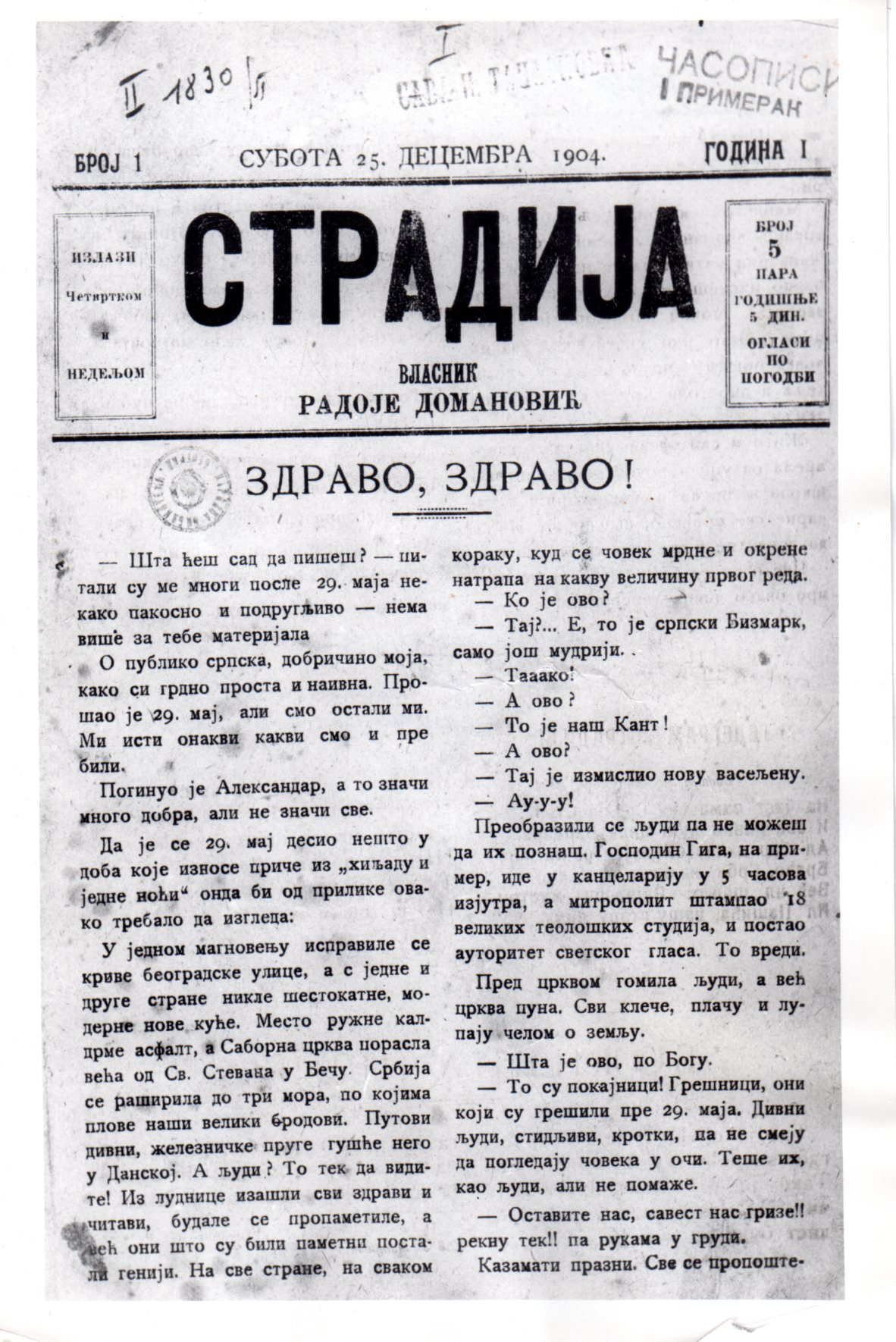
- front page of the first issue of Stradija (1904)
- Founder: Radoje Domanović
- Editor-in-chief: Radoje Domanović
- Founded: December 25, 1904
- Ceased publication: May 29, 1905
- Political alignment: Liberal
- Language: Serbian
- Headquarters: Belgrade
- Country: Kingdom of Serbia

Stradija (Serbian Cyrillic: Страдија) was a Serbian satirical magazine. The first issue was published on December 25, 1904, and the last on May 29, 1905.

It was published in Belgrade in the Serbian language, printed in the Cyrillic script. Here, Radoje Domanović published a series of satires in prose and verse, with which he ridiculed petty-bourgeois society. A total of 50 of Domanović's stories from the newspaper Stradija were later printed in his Complete Works. At the time of publication of Stradija, radicals were in power, to which Domanović also belonged, so he also criticized them.
