= Radoje Domanović =

Serbian journalist, writer and teacher (1873–1908)

Radoje Domanović Радоје Домановић
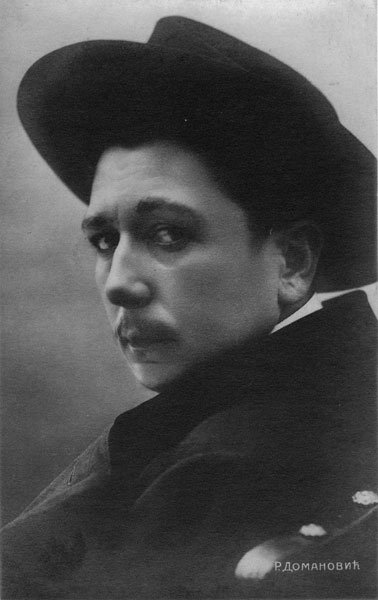
- Born: February 16, 1873; Ovsište, Principality of Serbia
- Died: August 17, 1908 (aged 35); Belgrade, Kingdom of Serbia
- Resting place: Belgrade New Cemetery
- Occupations: Teacher; journalist; writer
- Spouse: Natalija Ristić (m. 1875)
- Children: Zoran and Danica
- Writing career
- Period: 1893–1903
- Notable works: Danga (1899); Vođa (1901); Stradija (1902); Razmišljanje jednog običnog srpskog vola (1902); Kraljević Marko po drugi put među Srbima (1902)
- Literary movement: Realism

Radoje Domanović (Serbian Cyrillic: Радоје Домановић; February 16, 1873 – August 17, 1908) was a Serbian journalist, writer and teacher, most famous for his satirical short stories. His adult years were a constant fight against tuberculosis. This circumstance of his life, and the affection which he inspired in all who knew him, created an aura of romanticism and sentimentality which stand in contrast to his literary accomplishments as a satirist and a powerful critic of the contemporary Serbian society.

== Biography ==
Domanović was born in the village of Ovsište which is located in Topola municipality, Šumadija District. He attended a gymnasium in Kragujevac. Two of his teachers, Pera Đorđević and Sreten Stojković, who were followers of Svetozar Marković, were arrested for an attempt to take control of the local government and displaying a red flag. From 1890 to 1894, Domanović studied history and philology at Belgrade's Grande École. He read some of his first works to the members of a student organization Pobratimstvo (Bloodbrothers). Domanović was among the first writers to begin to produce an independent expression of their own urban experience in their new works, and it was not long before the term "Belgrade prose" (beogradska proza) was adopted to refer to this trend in which Belgrade played an important role, not just as the setting for action but almost as an actor itself.

Domanović is considered the best satirist in all Serbian literature during the turn of the 20th century. A gifted writer interested in politics, Domanović wielded his implacable pen against the injustices of a democracy in the making.

Writing comedic and satirical stories, Domanović is also remembered for his Kraljević Marko po drugi put među Srbima (Kraljević Marko for the Second Time among the Serbs). Re-inventing the folk hero Prince Marko, Domanović places him in the modern world. Hearing the laments of his fellow Serbs, Marko asks permission from God to return to earth that he might help them. His wish is granted, and Marko finds himself in Belgrade. Unfortunately, his way of dealing with situations—by striking his enemies with his mace—is not appreciated either by the authorities or by the ordinary men and women in the street. There are many lessons that Marko must learn, if he is to succeed.

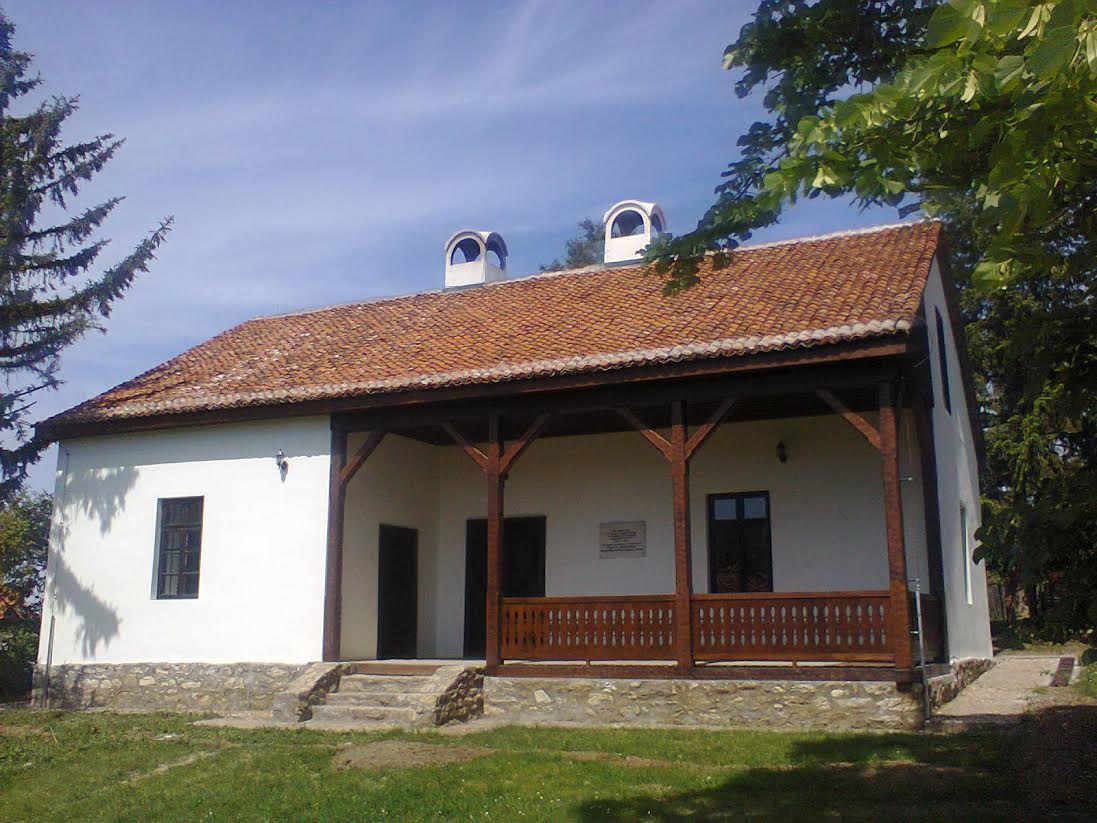
Birthplace of Radoje Domanović in Ovsište

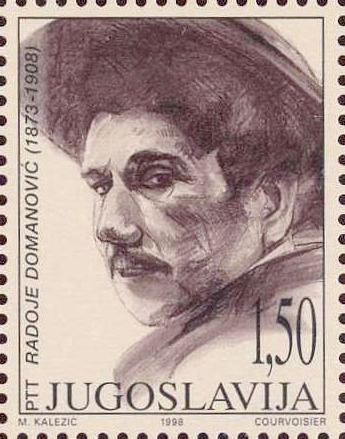
Portrait of Radoja Domanović on a Yugoslav postage stamp

In 1893, Domanović wrote and published his first work, a short story Na mesečini (In the Moonlight), in a popular magazine for intellectuals called Javor. Two years later, he got his first tenure as a lecturer in a gimnasium in Pirot. There he met Jaša Prodanović, who helped found the Serbian independent Radical Party in 1901. At that time, Domanović joined Republikanska stranka (The Republican Party), and married Natalija Ristić. He took an active part to maintain the doctrine of republicanism during the time of the monarchy. He was threatened repeatedly not to criticize The Establishment. After nine months, he was transferred, as a punishment on request of his political rivals, to the Vranje Gymnasium. On the same count, after a year in Vranje, he was transferred to Leskovac. Following a critical speech on the position of teachers in 1898, he was dismissed from his post, along with his wife. As a response, he wrote a short story Ukidanje strasti (The Tearing of Passion).

In 1899, he published two collections of short stories and his famous story Danga, perhaps an inspiration for Yevgeny Zamyatin's We. The following year, he got a well-paying, government job as a clerk in the State's Archive. In 1902, after he published Stradija, he was again dismissed from his post. In the mythical land of Stradije Domanović shows how police spared voters from troubling themselves to cast votes in free elections while government ministers played musical chairs. (Even at the end of the twentieth century there is nothing to add to the criticism of the mentality of slavery, of political deceit, and of the propaganda that always succeeds). Domanović started writing editorials for magazine Odjek (Echo). After the coup in 1903, Domanović returned to his post, and soon got a stipend to work on his stories. It was rumoured that the coup saved his life, since he was on a list for liquidation of the old government. In 1904, he started a magazine Stradija, that had 35 editions. The following year, he was appointed to the State Press corps. He died in 1908 of tuberculosis survived by his wife, son Zoran and daughter Danica.

== Works ==
Domanović was among the first writers (along with Milutin Uskoković, Rastko Petrović, Bogdan Popović, Jovan Skerlić, and others) to begin to produce an independent expression of their own urban experience in their new works, and it was not long before the term "Beogradska proza"—the Belgrade prose—was adopted to refer to this trend in which the city played an important function, not just as the setting for action but almost as an actor itself.

Domanović could be compared to Jonathan Swift, and indeed, some critics have suggested that he is the Serbian Swift, as he was exceptionally skilled in writing caustic satire rendering his stories overwhelmingly pessimistic and bleak.

Domanović lived for only 35 years and did not publish much, leaving some work in manuscript form. But in the last years of his brief life he projected and in part completed an ambitious fictional project which did justice to his theories. He proposed to tell in a series of short stories the wrongdoings and excesses in the political and social life of a society trying to find itself.

== Short stories ==
=== Satires ===
- Demon
- Ukidanje strasti
- Ne razumem
- Ozbiljne naučne stvari
- Hajduk Stanko po kritičarskom receptu g. Momčila Ivanića
- Vođa
- Kraljević Marko po drugi put među Srbima
- Danga
- Stradija
- Razmišljanje jednog običnog srpskog vola
- Mrtvo more
- Moderni ustanak
- Naša posla
- Kralj Aleksandar po drugi put među Srbima

=== Short stories ===
- Pozorište u palanci
- Nigde spasa
- Sima Penzionar
- Na mlađima svet ostaje
- The, šta ćeš
- Poklon kralju
- Uzor lenjosti
- Ubio mu polet
- Lovčev zapisnik
- Šule
- U seoskoj me'ani
- Snovi i java
- Baba Stana
- Smrt
- Najteža osuda
- Braća
- Slava
- Iz beležaka sa sela
- Objava
- Na raskršću
- Idealista
- Pevačev Uskrs

=== from Odjek (1902-1903) ===
- Iz Stradije
- Fuzija
- Proteran
- Ne strahujmo za privredu
- Kao deca šljive
- Privredni pacijenti
- Bistrina g. Milićeva
- Marksisti po praksi
- Politički razgovori po Olendorfovoj metodi
- Naši državnici
- Sudbina
- Ne mešaj se u tuđ posao
- Ča-Bođrev đokat

=== from Stradija (1904-1905) ===
- Zdravo, zdravo
- Božićna priča
- Srpska inicijativa
- Šta bi bilo
- Gospodin poslužitelj
- Naš ženski svet
- Ugledno dobro
- Patriotizan po naredbi
- Još jedan prilog uglednoj ekonomiji
- Admiral flote
- Naš socijalista
- Nevolja i kesa
- Član "Seljačke sloge"
- Ćuti, pa trpi
- Poznanici
- Ilija, udri
- Svaki ceni na svoju ruku
- Državni mislilac
- Praznik rada
- Dosadan čovek
- Policijska mudrost
- Smišljena trampa
- Slava okružnoj svinji
- Dobročinstvo
- Još traži karakter
- Javno mnjenje
- Naša podlost
- Traži se pogodan neprijatelj
- Naš ženski svet
- Osnov podozrenja

=== from Novi pokret (1906) ===
- Božićna priča
- Iz zemlje čuda i iznenađenja - Uspomene jednog Engleza posvećene "Legalnom rešenju"
- Sitne duše s krupnim ambicijama
- Cveti
- "Odjeku"
- "Raduj se", zemljo
- Radikalnoj demokratiji
- Razgovor sa demokratijom

== Legacy ==
Many primary schools and libraries (in Leskovac, Surdulica, Rača, Topola and Velika Plana) in Serbia are named after Radoje Domanović. “Radoje Domanović” foundation awards the eponymous award for satirical works and overall contribution to Serbian satire.

Radoje Domanović Project was initiated in 2013 with the goal to digitize collected works of Radoje Domanović, and make them more widely available to readers worldwide by publishing translations of Domanović’s short stories.

== Sources ==
- Adapted from Serbian Wikipedia article: sr:Радоје Домановић
- Translated and adapted from Jovan Skerlić's Istorija Nove Srpske Književnosti / History of New Serbian Literature (Belgrade, 1921), pages 403-405.

Preceded by Position created	Editor-in-chief of Stradija; 1904–1905	Succeeded by Position abolished
