= Los Angeles Alligator Farm =

20th-century American tourist attraction

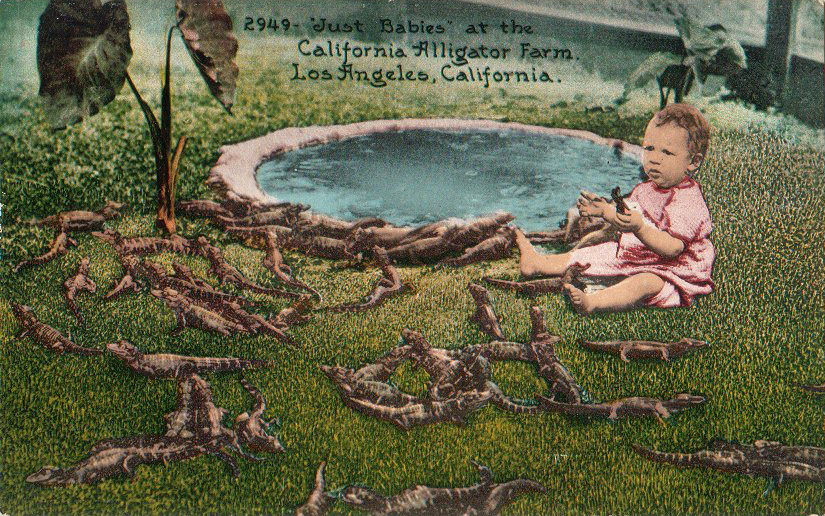
- 1906 postcard from the Los Angeles Alligator Farm
- Interactive map of Los Angeles Alligator Farm
- Location: Lincoln Heights, Los Angeles, California, U.S.
- Coordinates: 34.0685°N 118.2020°W
- Status: Defunct
- Opened: 1907
- Closed: 1984
- Owner: Joe Campbell
- Theme: Animal theme park

The Los Angeles Alligator Farm was an alligator farm and a major city tourist attraction from 1907 until it moved in 1953, finally closing in 1984. It was located next door to the Los Angeles Ostrich Farm in the Lincoln Heights neighborhood of Los Angeles, California, United States.

== History ==
Originally situated across from Lincoln Park, at 3627 Mission Road, it moved to Buena Park, California in 1953, where it was renamed the California Alligator Farm.

The Buena Park location was a “two-acre, junglelike park” across from Knott’s Berry Farm. Circa 1974, it housed “more than a hundred species representing all five orders of reptiles, with an emphasis on crocodilians.” Alligator and snake shows were held daily in summer and weekly in the off-season.

In 1951, it was reported there were 2000 alligators at the farm. For the 1967 film, The Happiest Millionaire, the farm loaned Disney Studios 12 alligators that were featured in the film.

The attraction was shut down in 1984 after attendance dropped below 50,000 people annually, and the animals were relocated to a private estate in Florida.

== See also ==
- Cawston Ostrich Farm
