= The Leader (story) =

Short story by Radoje Domanović

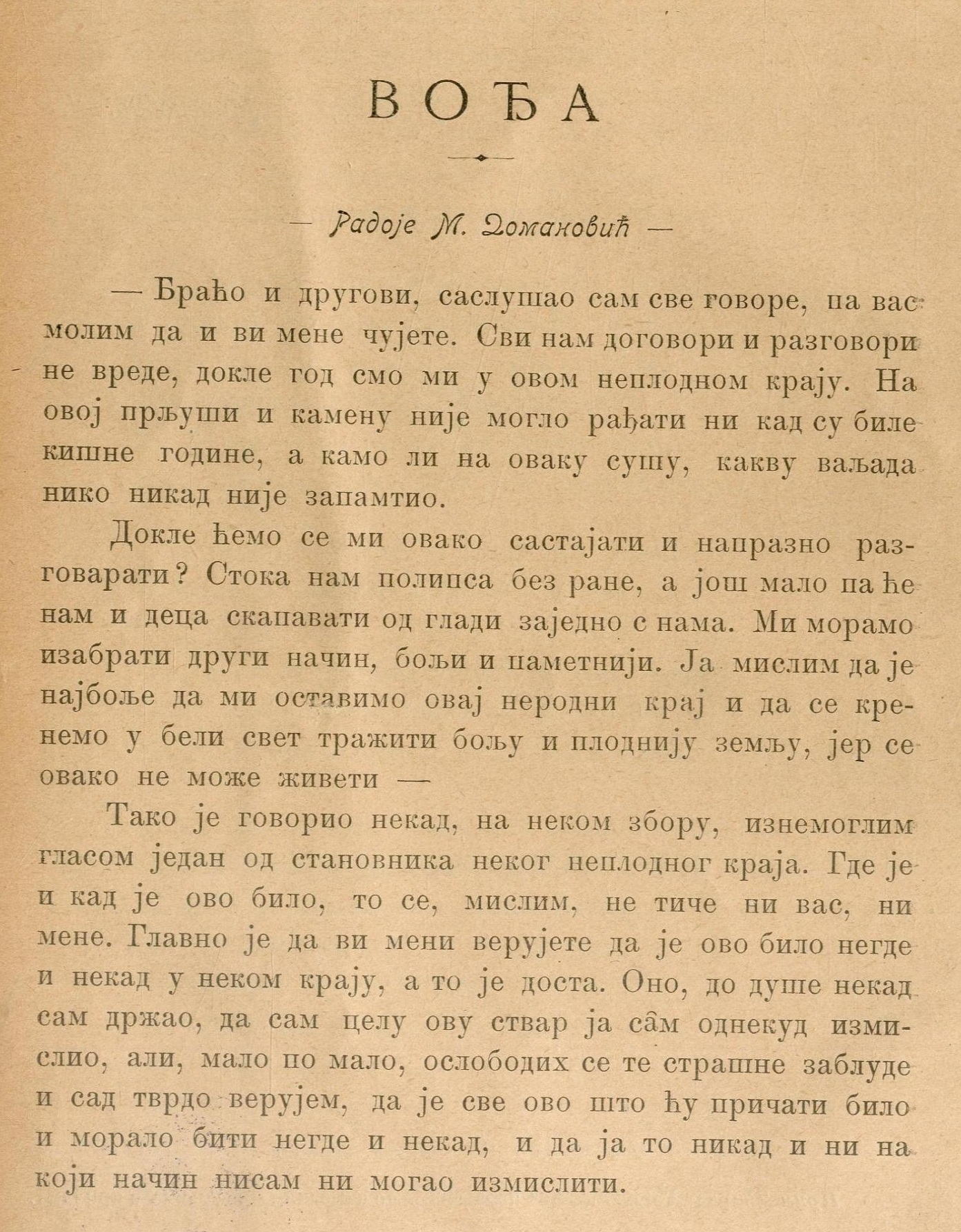
- Author: Radoje Domanović
- Genre: Satirical story
- Publication date: 1901

The Leader is a satirical story written by Serbian satirist Radoje Domanović, first published in 1901 in Belgrade.

== Plot summary ==
In the beginning of the story, we see a group of people from an impoverished region discussing to leave the barren area they live, but they are unable to reach a consensus nor do they trust each other enough to elect a leader among themselves.

In the end, they decide upon a silent stranger who came to the village the day before. The old man agrees to lead them but remains entirely impassive, and they come to believe that he is so silent because he is pensive and extremely wise, and everybody finds in his silence and demeanour some proof of his excellent wisdom.

Two hundred families set off the next day, and immediately encounter difficulties. The leader leads them directly into the fence, and then stops dead in his track and starts hitting it with his cane, without saying a word. Despite the children pointing out the door in the fence nearby, men follow the leader blindly, and break the fence down so that they could continue the journey on the leader's path. Similar obstacles follow, but they push on. Days pass, some children and old people die on the road, and all are exhausted and wounded but still hopeful that this difficult road will lead them into a better land.

One day they reach a large ravine, and the leader walks straight on and falls in. Some people run away, but the majority follows the leader into the abyss. Survivors keep following the leader, who survives the fall intact, but the party slowly diminishes until just three other men remain alive after falling into a second ravine. Only then do they confront the leader, who is again unharmed, and find out that he had been born blind. The story ends in ominous cawing of the ravens above.

== Historical background ==
The story was published in the opposition-leaning literary magazine Zvezda (Star), whose chief editor was Janko Veselinović.

When he first became involved in politics, Radoje Domanović joined the People's Radical Party. The Party's program was initially inspired by French Radicalism and ideas of Svetozar Marković, and Nikola Pašić was elected as the president of the central committee at the Party's first conference. In September 1883, the Timok Rebellion broke out in eastern Serbia when King Milan Obrenović declared that peasants' arms should be confiscated by the army. He charged the Radicals that with their article in Samouprava, they had encouraged the peasants to refuse to give up their weapons. The rebellion was set down in ten days. Most of the party leadership was captured in the aftermath, apart from Pašić, who escaped to the Bulgaria and a few others. The régime sentenced many of these Radicals to death, including the remainder of the leadership in absentia. However, after some time, amnesty was given to certain Radicals, including Pašić, who agreed to enter Obrenović's government in 1887.

Đuro Knežević, a member of the People's Radical Party attempted to assassinate ex-king Milan in 1899. Due to his political affiliation, many Party's leaders, again including Pašić, who was still at the Party's helm, were imprisoned. At the request of the court, Pašić agreed to publicly accuse his own party of anti-dynastical activities, and denounce other party members as traitors. Despite all this, he still remained the leader of the Radical Party until his death in 1926, and held a number of important political posts, including becoming prime minister of Serbia for five terms, and of the Kingdom of Serbs, Croats and Slovenes for two terms.

The story, written in 1901, is intended primarily to satirize Pašić's infamous path to success, and the masses’ relationship with him. The same way the leader in the story is silent and does not impose himself, Pašić was skillful in remaining taciturn, he could always be seen on Party meetings, but hardly ever heard. The leader is oblivious of his own inadequacy, and agrees to lead the people knowing he is blind, and he is indifferent to the pain that his followers were submitted to, just as Pašić had avoided prosecution during Party's time of suffering. Radoje also gave the leader some of Pašić's physical characteristics, including his trademark long beard.

== Legacy ==
Of all Domanović's satirical stories, "The Leader" is the most homogeneous allegorical story he has written, as it is not pieced together of different short anecdotes like some other of his famous stories (such as "Stradija" or "Dead Sea"). Although written with a particular person and sequence of events in mind, it has successfully abstracted and captured the universal themes of authority, leadership, herd mentality etc. making it one of Domanović's most successful and most reprinted stories.

“The Leader" is also the most translated Domanović's story. Until August 2020, it has been translated into 31 languages, 13 between the first publication in 1901 and 2019, and 18 more since 2019, for the "Radoje Domanovic" Project.
