= Los Angeles Leadership Academy =

Charter school in California, USA

Coordinates: 34.078802°N 118.211496°W

Los Angeles Leadership Academy is a free charter school system in Los Angeles, California. The school has been noted with an alumni that has nearly a 100 percent acceptance to college. Students that graduate from Los Angeles Leadership Academy have been admitted to and attended Harvard, Stanford, North Western, Brown, Cal Poly, Penn State, UC Berkeley, and Penn State just to name a few. The schools in the system includes Los Angeles Leadership Academy Primary School, Los Angeles Leadership Academy Middle School, and Los Angeles Leadership Academy High School. The school is one of the 13 schools located in Lincoln Heights.

== History ==
The school opened in 2002 in Koreatown. In its first year, it had almost 120 students. The school opened with the sixth grade and planned to phase in one new grade each year, with high school expansion coming later. The school initially rented space from the Immanuel Presbyterian Church. Roger Lowenstein, a former criminal defense attorney, founded the school. The school was founded to academically prepare students and to orient them as community activists and reflects Lowenstein's liberal views. Promoters of the school passed out fliers at bus stops. Lowenstein said that the new school did not have difficulty in finding new students since the local public middle schools were overcrowded with students and parents wanted a safe environment for their children.

In 2008 it had two campuses, with the high school in the former Florence Crittenton Center in Lincoln Heights and the middle school in Koreatown. In 2010, the school acquired the 2.5 acre former Salvation Army campus in Lincoln Heights, two blocks south of the high school. Today, that campus serves grades K-8, and the Koreatown campus no longer exists. The primary program is dual language immersion, Spanish and English. All students are taught to be bilingual, biliterate and bicultural. Growing a grade a year (in 2013, K-3), eventually the dual language program will be K-12, with high school graduates capable of choosing universities in Spain, Mexico, Chile or any in English-speaking country.

== Academic program ==
The school has a low dropout rate. Lowenstein said "We don't let a kid fail." As of 2013, three quarters of the graduating students attend four year colleges and universities, while the remainder attend community colleges.

== Student body ==
As of 2013, the majority of the students were Latino and Hispanic, with some being Asian, Black, and White. The students are low income and receive free breakfast, and lunch. All students have free access to tutoring, and afterschool enrichment programs that include photography, culinary arts, dance, and anime. During the same year, the middle school had 280 students and the high school had 260 students.

== Teacher and staff demographics ==
In 2002, during the first year of operations, the school had eight teachers. The schools which awarded degrees to those teachers were University of California, Berkeley, University of California, Los Angeles, Dartmouth College, Harvard University, and Yale University. The program director in charge of curriculum, Susanne Cole, had studied a school operated by the Zapatistas in Chiapas, Mexico and received a public policy master's degree from UC Berkeley. One teacher had a history of organizing unions in Koreatown. One teacher had worked for a Quaker nonviolence peace movement, serving as a grassroots organizer.

== School lunch program ==
The primary, middle and high school sites now rely on Royal Dining Food Company to serve their students food during breakfast and lunch.

== Parent involvement ==
. Bill Boyarsky of the Jewish Journal of Greater Los Angeles said that the parents council is active.
