= 200th birth anniversary of Karl Marx =

2018 commemoration by Chinese Communist Party

Assembly Commemorating the 200th Anniversary of the Birth of Karl Marx
- Date: 4 May 2018
- Locations: Great Hall of the People, Beijing
- Coordinates: 39°54′12″N 116°23′15″E
- Country: China
- Party General Secretary: Xi Jinping
- People: Wang Huning (meeting chair)

200th birth anniversary of Karl Marx
- Simplified Chinese: 纪念马克思诞辰200周年大会
- Traditional Chinese: 紀念馬克思誕辰200週年大會
Transcriptions
Standard Mandarin
- Hanyu Pinyin: Jìniàn Mǎkèsī Dànchén 200 Zhōunián Dàhuì

The Assembly Commemorating the 200th Anniversary of the Birth of Karl Marx was a commemorative meeting held by the Central Committee of the Chinese Communist Party on 4 May 2018 to commemorate 200th anniversary of the birth of Karl Marx.

The meeting was held at the Great Hall of the People in Beijing, and was chaired by CCP Politburo Standing Committee member Wang Huning. CCP General Secretary Xi Jinping delivered a keynote speech at the meeting, where he praised Marx as "the greatest thinker in human history" and stated Marxism continued to guide the CCP and China. The gathering ended with rhythms of "The Internationale".

== Meeting ==
=== Preparation ===
On the evenings of 3 and 4 March 2018, to commemorate the 200th anniversary of Karl Marx's birth, the Publicity Department of the Chinese Communist Party guided the Central Party History and Literature Research Institute and China Media Group to jointly produce a two-part television documentary called The Immortal Marx which premiered on CCTV-1.

On 27 April 2018, to commemorate the 200th anniversary of Marx's birth, the Theoretical Bureau of the Publicity Department of the CCP, the Publicity Department of the Jiangsu Provincial Committee of the CCP, and Jiangsu Broadcasting Corporation jointly produced a five-episode popular theoretical dialogue program titled Marx Got It Right, which premiered on CCTV-1. On 1 May 2018, to commemorate the 200th anniversary of Karl Marx's birth, the People's Daily published an article by Ren Zhongping entitled His Heroic Name and Cause Will Live Forever (他的英名和事业永世长存).

=== Speech ===
On 4 May 2018, the gathering commemorating the 200th anniversary of Karl Marx's birth was held at the Great Hall of the People in Beijing. The meeting was chaired by Wang Huning, member of the Politburo Standing Committee, and Xi Jinping, General Secretary of the CCP Central Committee, President of China, and Chairman of the Central Military Commission, delivered a speech. Li Keqiang, Li Zhanshu, Wang Yang, Zhao Leji, Han Zheng, members of the Politburo Standing Committee, and Vice President Wang Qishan and other party and state leaders attended the meeting, totaling roughly 3,000 people.

Xi Jinping praised Marx as the "teacher of revolution for the proletariat and workers all over the world" and "the greatest thinker in human history" and called Das Kapital "the bible of the working class" with theories that continued "to emanate their brilliant rays of truth". He lauded Marxism for its goal of "the emancipation of humankind" giving "a powerful source of inspiration for people to understand and remould the world". Xi said "Writing Marxism onto the flag of the Chinese Communist Party was totally correct... Unceasingly promoting the sinification and modernization of Marxism is totally correct". He emphasized the difference between the CCP and non-Marxist parties, stating "the basic difference between a Marxist political party and other political parties is that the former always stands with the people and fights for their interests". Xi praised Marx for having recognized for scientifically identifying the patterns of human development, including "the laws governing capitalist operations", and said China continued to have a "firm belief in the scientific truth of Marxism". Xi said Marx's insight into the centrality of the relationship between the factors of production and the relations of production enabled China to "complete a process of development that had taken the West several centuries to complete, thus propelling our country's high-speed rise to become the world's second-largest economy".

Xi said Marxism had remained "a formidable theoretical tool which we use to understand the world, grasp its underlying patterns, search for its truth, and effect change", meaning the CCP had "to have a complete mastery of the worldviews and methodologies of dialectical and historical materialism, and fully understand that realizing Communism is a historical process involving the step-by-step achievement of milestones along the way". He said that due to China's current development levels, "at present, the importance of reform, development, stability, the number of contradictions, risks, and challenges, and the tests of our capacity to govern are all at an unprecedented level", meaning it is "essential that we continually improve our ability to utilize Marxism to analyse and resolve practical problems, and continually improve our ability to utilize scientific theories to guide us in responding to major challenges and addressing major contradictions". While saying there were no "doctrinal" or "immutable version of socialism", Marx provided a universal methodology for investigating and responding to the world which had remained essential. He said to discard scientific socialism derived from Marxism would be to discard socialism itself as "it was with the victory of the 1917 October Revolution that socialism transformed from theory to reality and thus broke the global capitalist order which had dominated the world".

Xi said that despite international socialism encountering "complications in its development, the overall trend in human development had not changed, nor would it change." Xi said Marxism continued "to advance the progress of human civilization, to provide theoretical and discursive systems of major international influence such that Marx to this day continues to be acknowledged as the 'number one thinker of the millennium'". Xi argued Marxist theory continued to be universally applicable, not just to China, as the global modes of capitalist production that emerged through economic globalization would inevitably generate their own internal contradictions. He said these would drive the world to change:

Studying Marx requires us to study and practice Marxist thought on world history. Marx and Engels once said that, "The more the original isolation of separate nationalities is destroyed by the developed mode of production, commerce, and the division of labour between various nations naturally brought forth by these, the more does history become world history." Marx and Engels's prediction of those years has since become a reality; history and reality increasingly prove the scientific value of this prediction... We need to look from the perspective of world history and examine the development trends and the problems we face in the world today.

The gathering ended with rhythms of "The Internationale".
