= Leader (surname) =

Leader is a British surname. Notable people with the surname include:

- Benjamin Williams Leader (1831–1923), English artist
- Bill Leader (born 1929), English record producer
- George M. Leader (1918–2013), American politician
- Guy Leader (1887–1978), American politician
- Imre Leader (born 1963), British mathematician
- Jeffery J. Leader (born 1963), American mathematician
- John Temple Leader (1810–1903), British politician and connoisseur
- Joyce Ellen Leader (born 1942), American diplomat
- Michael Leader (1938–2016), English actor
- Otis Wilson Leader, a World War II Choctaw code talker
- William Leader (1767–1828), British MP
- Zachary Leader (born 1946), American professor of English Literature
