= Lider =

Lider may refer to:

- Ivri Lider – Israeli musician
- Lider (political party), a political party in Bulgaria
- Lider-class destroyer, a class of ships of the Russian Navy
- Líder, a retail chain in Chile
- Renewed Democratic Liberty, abbreviated LIDER, a political party in Guatemala
- LÍDER, a Spanish magazine mostly about tabletop role-playing games and fantasy or related media that was published by Joc Internacional
- Lider TV – Azeri television channel
