= Marx Got It Right =

Chinese television series

- Chinese: 马克思是对的
- Genre: Talk show
- Presented by: Wu Xuelan
- Country of origin: China
- Original language: Chinese
- No. of seasons: 1
- No. of episodes: 5

Production
- Running time: 33 minutes

Original release
- Network: China Central Television
- Release: 27 April – 1 May 2018

Marx Got It Right (Chinese: 马克思是对的) is a Chinese talk show commemorating the 200th birthday of Karl Marx (1818–1883). China Central Television ran the five-episode series from 27 April to 1 May 2018. Chinese Communist Party websites promoted the series, which is hosted by Wu Xuelan and features cartoons and anecdotes to describe Marxism.

== Premise ==
The show features well-known theoretical experts, university teachers, and college student representatives from all over China. Two scholars are tasked with explaining Marxism and answering questions on-the-spot. The People's Daily commented that the show aims to sinicize Marxist philosophy into plain language for Chinese TV viewers.

== Episodes ==
Episode Number	Episode Name	Broadcast Date
Episode 1	Hello, Marx	April 27, 2018
Episode 2	An eye that sees the world	April 28, 2018
Episode 3	The Immortal Theory of Capital	April 29, 2018
Episode 4	Liberate the minds of all mankind	April 30, 2018
Episode 5	Millennial thinker	May 1, 2018

== Reception ==
The show has been seen as an element of the Chinese government's embrace of Marxism through Xi Jinping Thought.

Initial comments on Chinese social media expressed sarcasm over the presentation style of the show, but not of the content of the show itself.

Chris Buckley of The New York Times describes Marx Got It Right as "a slickly produced program that is part talk show, part indoctrination session – and a vivid illustration of the quirky efforts that the Communist Party under General Secretary Xi Jinping is making to win over China's millennials."
