= Leadership: Six Studies in World Strategy =

2022 book by Henry Kissinger

- First edition (UK)
- Author: Henry Kissinger
- Language: English
- Genre: International relations, History
- Publisher: Penguin Press; Allen Lane (UK)
- Publication date: 2022
- Publication place: United States
- Media type: Print (hardcover)
- Pages: 528 (English edition)
- ISBN: 978-0241542002

Leadership: Six Studies in World Strategy is an English-language book on international relations by Henry Kissinger, published by Penguin Books on April 28, 2022. The book reflects Kissinger's views on effective leadership, presenting a treatise on governance and political leaders through six exemplary individuals from the 20th century, including Konrad Adenauer, Charles de Gaulle, Margaret Thatcher, Lee Kuan Yew, Anwar Sadat, and Richard Nixon.

== Overview ==
The book begins with the introduction, which is a short essay on leadership and statesmanship. Kissinger identifies courage and strength of character as the most important qualities of political leaders. After that, the following chapters present political leaders whom Henry Kissinger classifies as significant leaders. All of them governed in the second half of the 20th century and were personally acquainted with the author, in some cases even friends with him.

=== Konrad Adenauer: The Strategy of Humility ===
Konrad Adenauer came to power in the destroyed post-war Germany at a relatively old age. He came from the Catholic Rhineland and was an experienced politician who had served as mayor of the city of Cologne during the Weimar Republic. He was able to successfully communicate the new political order to the population and thus made a decisive contribution to West Germany regaining its sovereignty. Adenauer favored the integration of West Germany into the West over a possible German reunification, even in the face of domestic political opposition. He thus established the basis for the economic miracle and a stable democracy in the country. Kissinger praises him as a person who established a new political tradition in Germany out of difficult circumstances.

=== Charles de Gaulle: The Strategy of Will ===
The author evaluates Charles de Gaulle as a political personality with a strong will and an unconditional historical mission to initiate the political and social renewal of France. After the defeat of France against Nazi Germany in 1940, he built up his own army in exile and became the leader of Free France. In doing so, he demanded to speak on equal terms with the Allies, even though his homeland was occupied. At the end of World War II, he reached the top of the state, but resigned when the newly established state did not agree with his ideas. After a state crisis during the Algerian War, De Gaulle returned and established the Fifth Republic in 1958. He succeeded in ending the Algerian War and, as a formative figure, re-established France as an independent political power.

=== Richard Nixon: The Strategy of Equilibrium ===
Richard Nixon became the 37th President of the United States in 1969 and made Kissinger, an academic, his National security advisor. According to the author, Nixon changed his initially isolationist views in his life to the concept of a balance of powers. Therefore, he visited the People's Republic of China in 1972 and began the Ping-pong diplomacy to balance against the Soviet Union. The integration of China into the international system is judged by the author to be a major historical achievement and a crucial turning point of the Cold War. Nixon also initiated the withdrawal of American troops from Vietnam, conducted peace negotiations in the Middle East, and, in the author's observation, was able to avert an international crisis in the Bangladesh war. Nixon was forced to resign in 1974 as part of the Watergate scandal, which Kissinger calls a "tragedy."

=== Anwar Sadat: The Strategy of Transcendence ===
After the death of the popular Gamal Abdel Nasser, his close confidant Anwar Sadat became Egypt's president in 1970. Sadat, who was widely underestimated, was not initially expected to hold his own in this position. Thanks to clever political maneuvering, however, he succeeded in consolidating his position. As president, Sadat initiated economic liberalization and a foreign policy shift away from the Soviet Union. He was able to strengthen his position in peace negotiations with Israel with a surprise attack on the Israeli-occupied Sinai Peninsula. In 1979, he concluded the Israel–Egypt peace treaty, in which Egypt gained control of the Sinai in return for diplomatic recognition of Israel. However, the agreement isolated Sadat in the Arab world and cost him his life when he was assassinated by Islamists in a 1981 attack.

=== Lee Kuan Yew: The Strategy of Excellence ===
Lee Kuan Yew was born into a Chinese family in the British colony of Singapore. He is characterized as a very gifted and hardworking student who, as a youth, had to experience the brutal Japanese occupation of Singapore during World War II. After the war ended, he studied at the University of Cambridge and returned to his homeland, where he became a politician. After Singapore's expulsion from Malaysia in 1965, Lee became the head of state of the now independent state of Singapore, which was then in a precarious economic and security situation. Under Lee's decades of autocratic rule, the city-state successfully industrialized and became an economic and political model throughout Asia. After his resignation in 1990, he became an internationally recognized elder statesman.

=== Margaret Thatcher: The Strategy of Conviction ===
When Margaret Thatcher became the first female Prime Minister of the United Kingdom in 1979, the country was in a very difficult situation. It suffered from high inflation, economic stagnation and the decline of its foreign policy power. Thatcher pushed through her program of economic liberalization against strong opposition. As a result, Thatcher was finally able to revitalize the economy and initiate the country's rise to become a globally important financial center. Thanks to her good personal relationship with U.S. President Ronald Reagan, she was able to revive the Special Relationship with the United States and counter the expansion of communism during the Cold War. Kissinger assesses Thatcher as a determined politician and staunch defender of liberal values. In the author's assessment, her country's quick victory in the Falklands War enabled it to regain its respectability on the international stage and find a new place in the international order after the end of the British Empire.

=== Conclusion: The Evolution of Leadership ===
In the final conclusion, the author describes modern society as a meritocracy that has replaced the old aristocratic age. Thus, all six personalities described did not come from the classical upper class of their societies. Instead, they would have had the ethos of the new middle classes. He describes as common characteristics a sense of reality, their own vision, boldness, inner calm and the ability to act against the existing consensus. He also mentions a comprehensive humanistic and civic education and a religious upbringing (except for Lee Kuan Yew) as common features. According to the author, all personalities had also divided their own society.

Due to the decline of the humanistic educational ideal at universities, Kissinger sees the education of good Civil Servants endangered. Education would be increasingly quantitative and produce mainly specialized technocrats and activists, threatening to lose broad historical and philosophical perspectives. Elite and populace would also increasingly view each other with mutual suspicion and dislike, eroding a shared Civic Culture.

Kissinger sees the transformation from a written culture to a visual culture as having come about through modern media and the Internet, which has an influence on the collective consciousness. According to the author, foreshortening and emotionalization in the Internet age are increasingly endangering the in-depth and holistic examination of facts. Politics would increasingly be made through emotional images, whereby analytical elements could be lost. A high pressure to conform is being generated by the media, which politicians find difficult to escape. At the same time, rising geopolitical tensions and new forms of warfare (like cyberwarfare or artificial intelligence) are reducing the scope for error for political leaders.

== Receptions ==
The Economist described the book as "partial but enlightening" and criticized Kissinger for omitting from the chapter on Nixon unpleasant episodes such as Watergate or the bombing of Cambodia. The left-leaning Guardian criticized Kissinger for omitting the "death and destruction" caused by the statesmen Kissinger admired. The Guardian's reviewer added that the portrait drawn of Nixon is sympathetic and at the same time incomplete. The portrayals of Charles de Gaulle and Margaret Thatcher were described as one-sided and influenced by Kissinger's own worldview.

The right-leaning Wall Street Journal, on the other hand, came to a positive conclusion. The work is an "extraordinary book" that represents an "interesting collection of historical case studies and political biographies" and would rank with classics of the genre like Great Contemporaries by Winston Churchill or The Rise and Fall of the Great Powers by Paul Kennedy. Publishers Weekly described the policy analysis as lucid, stating that the book was a "vital study of power in action", but critiqued that "[many] readers will disagree with that interpretation and others".

== Editions ==
- 2022. Leadership: Six Studies in World Strategy. Penguin Books Ltd. ISBN 978-0241542002.
