= Inkstone News =

Hong Kong news website

- Website type: Online news
- Available in: English
- Owner: South China Morning Post Publishers Ltd.
- Website: inkstonenews.com
- Registration: None
- Current status: Inactive

Inkstone News (or simply Inkstone) was an online newspaper platform launched by Hong Kong–based company South China Morning Post Publishers Ltd. (the publisher of newspaper South China Morning Post) in March 2018. It was available as a website and mobile app. The website called itself a "daily digest of China-focused stories". It published a selection of stories every weekday morning (ET) on its website, as well as a daily newsletter and an audio edition on Google Assistant.

The platform reported news on the Chinese-speaking regions, including mainland China, Hong Kong, Macau, and Taiwan. It catered to young people and readers in the United States, its largest market, and is blocked in mainland China.

As of May 2021, the last edition was published on March 30, 2021. The site is no longer linked from the South China Morning Post's main site.
