= Lasson =

Lasson may refer to:

== People ==
- Adolf Lasson (1832–1917), a German Jewish philosophical writer.
- Georg Lasson (1862–1932), a German Protestant theologian.

== Places ==
There are communes that have the name Lasson in France:

- Lasson, Calvados, in the Calvados département
- Lasson, Yonne, in the Yonne département
