= Wulf =

Wulf (Common Germanic *wulfaz "wolf") was one of the most prolific elements in early Germanic names. It could figure as the first element in Germanic dithematic name, as in Wulfstan, but was especially common especially as the second element, in the form -ulf, -olf as in Cynewulf, Rudolph, Ludolf, Adolf, etc. Förstemann explains this as originally motivated by the wolf as an animal sacred to Wodanaz, but notes that the large number of names indicates that the element had become a meaningless suffix of male names at an early time (and was therefore no longer considered a "pagan" element at the time of Christianisation). Some early missionaries among Germanic folk still used it, like bishop Wulfilas however his family had been adopted earlier by the Goths. By the tenth century, there was clearly no pagan connotation left with such names, and saints and bishops bore names such as Wulfstan or Wolfgang).

Förstemann counts 381 names in -ulf, -olf, among which only four are feminine.

== Hypocorisms ==
The numerous names in -wulf, -ulf, -olf gave rise to hypocorisms from an early time, which were later also treated as given names in their own right. Among such names are the Anglo-Saxon Offa, Yffe, Uffa, Wuffa. Corresponding continental forms are Uffo, Uffi. The name of the ancient tribe of the Ubii may also be related.

Offa of Angel is a legendary king of the Angles recorded in the 9th-century genealogical tradition of the Anglo-Saxon Chronicle. Most of this tradition is spurious, but in the case of Offa, a case for possible historicity of a 5th-century figure has been made because of a matching account by Saxo Grammaticus. Offa of Essex and Offa of Mercia are two historical Anglo-Saxon kings. Offa of Mercia is said to have had been named Winfreth originally, and to have been the son of an ealdorman named Tingfrith. Because he miraculously recovered from a state of lameness and blindness as a child, he was called "the second Offa", after Offa of Angel, whose legend states that he underwent a similar recovery.

Wuffa is recorded as an early kings of the East Angles, eponymous of the Wuffingas dynasty.

The Scandinavian form is Ulf, e.g. Ulf the Earl (d. 1026). The ylva in the name of Ingrid Ylva (13th century) is presumably an epithet and not a hypocorism of a dithematic name (i.e. "Ingrid the she-wolf").

== Surname ==
The surname Wulf (and variants) is a typical example of a surname derived from a given name, often a patronymic in origin. These names by their nature can occur repeatedly and independently just based on the prevalence of the given name from which it is derived. Anglo-Norman variants include Wolfes, Woolf, Woolfe, Woulf, Wulff, Woof, Wooff, etc.

Early instances of this surname in Germany include one Tyle Wulf who lived in Treuenbrietzen in 1375 (Archiv for Sippenforschung und alle verwandten Gebiete) and one Nivelung Wolf who was a citizen of Cologne in 1135 (Kolner Schreinsurkunden).

Other people with the surname include:

- Andrea Wulf (born 1972), English biographer
- Berthold Wulf (1926–2012), German priest, poet and philosopher
- Christoph Wulf (born 1944), German anthropologist
- Georg Wulf (1895–1927), German aviation pioneer and aircraft manufacturer
- Hermann Wulf (1915-1990), German World War II officer and post-war Generalmajor
- Joseph Wulf (1912–1974), German-Polish-Jewish historian and Holocaust survivor
- Mareike Wulf (born 1979), German politician
- Marie Wulf (1685–1738), Danish pietist preacher
- Maurice De Wulf (1867–1947), Belgian philosopher and professor
- Oliver R. Wolf (1897–1987), American chemist, physicist, and meteorologist
- Rudi Wulf (born 1984), New Zealand rugby union player
- Rudolf Wulf (1905–1972), German Generalmajor during World War II
- Steve Wulf (born 1950), American sports writer and editor
- Theodor Wulf (1868–1946), German physicist and Jesuit priest
- William Wulf (born 1939), American computer scientist
- Vincent Wulf (born 1973), French rugby league footballer

== See also ==
- Wuffingas
- Wulfing
- Wolves in Germanic mythology
