= Georg Wilhelm Friedrich Hegel bibliography =

The following list of works by German philosopher Georg Wilhelm Friedrich Hegel (1770–1831).

== Collected works in German ==
=== Standard citation numbers ===
Hegel is cited—unless otherwise specified—on the basis of his output according w Eva Moldenhauer and Karl Markus Michel, Frankfurt a. M.: Suhrkamp, 1979. Prior to 1979, see below. Additions such as "A" or "B" refer to annotations added to the original text.

Band or the abbreviation Bd. is the German word meaning the volume number of the work.

The "1817 Encyclopaedia" contained only outline notes for students, called Zusatz ("addition"). They are often combined with the three books of Hegel's later work called "System der Philosophie I, II, III," the combinations being called the Encyclopaedia I, II and III.

Werke in 20 Bänden (complete works in 20 volumes), eds., E. Moldenhauer and K. M. Michel (Suhrkamp, 1969–1971).

Abbreviation	Band	Work
FS	1	Frühe Schriften (Early Writings)
JS	2	Jenaer Schriften (Jena Writings)
PG	3	Phänomenologie des Geistes (Phenomenology of Spirit)
NS	4	Nürnberger und Heidelberger Schriften
L I	5	Wissenschaft der Logik I
L II	6	Wissenschaft der Logik II
R	7	Grundlinien der Philosophie des Rechts
E I	8	Enzyklopädie der philosophischen Wissenschaften I
E II	9	Enzyklopädie der philosophischen Wissenschaften II
E III	10	Enzyklopädie der philosophischen Wissenschaften III
BS	11	Berliner Schriften 1818–1831
PGh	12	Vorlesungen über die Philosophie der Geschichte
Ä I	13	Vorlesungen über die Ästhetik I
Ä II	14	Vorlesungen über die Ästhetik II
Ä III	15	Vorlesungen über die Ästhetik III
Rel I	16	Vorlesungen über die Philosophie der Religion I
Rel II	17	Vorlesungen über die Philosophie der Religion II
GP I	18	Vorlesungen über die Geschichte der Philosophie I
GP II	19	Vorlesungen über die Geschichte der Philosophie II
GP III	20	Vorlesungen über die Geschichte der Philosophie III

Other volume numbers exist for the different editions of his complete works that were published at various times over the past two centuries:

=== Berlin 1832–1845 edition ===
Vollständige Ausgabe (complete edition)

- Bd. 1 Philosophische Abhandlungen
- Bd. 2 Phänomenologie des Geistes
- Bd. 3–5 Wissenschaft der Logik
- Bd. 6–7 Encyklopädie . . .
- Bd. 8 Grundlinien der Philosophie des Rechts . . .
- Bd. 9 Vorlesungen über die Philosophie der Geschichte
- Bd. 10 Vorlesungen über die Ästhetik
- Bd. 11–12 Vorlesungen über die Philosophie der Religion . .
- Bd. 13–15 Vorlesungen über die Geschichte der Philosophie
- Bd. 16–17 Vermischte Schritten
- Bd. 18 Philosophische Propädeutik
- Erg. Bd. 19 hg. von K. Hegel: Briefe von und an Hegel. Leipzig 1887

=== Stuttgart 1927–1940 edition ===
Sämtliche Werke (complete works), ed., H. Glockner

- Bd. 1 Aufsätze aus dem Kritischen Journal . .
- Bd. 2 Phänomenologie des Geistes
- Bd. 3 Philosophische Propädeutik
- Bd. 4–5 Wissenschaft der Logik
- Bd. 6 Enzyklopädie . . . (1817) u.a. Schriften
- Bd. 7 Grundlinien der Philosophie des Rechts
- Bd. 8–10 System der Philosophie
- Bd. 11 Vorlesungen über die Philosophie der Geschichte
- Bd. 12–14 Vorlesungen über die Ästhetik
- Bd. 15–16 Vorlesungen über die Philosophie der Religion
- Bd. 17–19 Vorlesungen über die Geschichte der Philosophie
- Bd. 20 Vermischte Schriften aus der Berliner Zeit

=== Leipzig 1911 edition ===
Sämtliche Werke, eds., Georg Lasson, später J. Hoffmeister.

- Bd.1 Erste Druckschriften. 1928
- Bd.2 Phänomenologie des Geistes. 1921 (1907)
- Bd.3–4 Wissenschaft der Logik. 1923
- Bd.5 Enzyklopädie . . . [1827 u. 1830]. 1920 (1905)
- Bd.6 Grundlinien der Philosophie des Rechts. 1911
- Bd.7 Schriften zur Politik und Rechtsphilosophie. 1913
- Bd.8-9 Philosophie der Weltgeschichte. 1919-1944
- Bd.10(A) Vorlesungen über die Ästhetik. Teilbd. i. 1931
- Bd.12–14 Vorlesungen über die Philosophie der Religion. 1921, 1927
- Bd.15(A) Vorlesungen über die Geschichte der Philosophie. Teilbd. 1 1940
- Bd.18 Jenenser Logik, Metaphysik und Naturphilosophie. 1923
- Bd.19 Jenenser Realphilosophie I. 1932
- Bd.20 Jenenser Realphilosophie II. 1931
- Bd.21 Nürnberger Schritten 1808–1816. 1938

=== Hamburg, 1968 ===
Gesammelte Werke – Akademie-Ausgabe (Academy edition)

== Translations of major works ==
=== Tübingen, Berne, Frankfurt period ===
- Three Essays, 1793-1795: The Tübingen Essay, Berne Fragments, the Life of Jesus (Tübingen, Berne 1793–95), tr. J. Dobbins and P. Fuss, 1984
- Early Theological Writings (Berne, Frankfurt 1795–1800), tr. T.M. Knox 1948, reprinted 1971

=== Jena period ===
- Philosophical Dissertation on the Orbits of the Planets and the Habilitation Theses, in Miscellaneous Writings of G. W. F. Hegel, edited by Jon Stewart, Evanston: Northwest University Press, 2002
- The Difference Between Fichte's and Schelling's Systems of Philosophy (the 'Differenzschrift') (Jena 1801), tr. H.S. Harris and W. Cerf 1977.
  - Available online: German text
- Natural Law (Jena, 1802), tr. T.M. Knox 1975
- Faith and Knowledge (Jena, 1802), tr. W. Cerf and H.S. Harris 1977
- System of Ethical Life and First Philosophy of Spirit (Jena, 1802, 1803–4), tr. H.S. Harris and T.M. Knox 1979.
  - Available online: System of Ethical Life
- The Jena System 1804-5: Logic and Metaphysics (Jena, 1804–5), tr. J. Burbidge and G. di Giovanni 1986. Second Jena system
- Hegel and the Human Spirit (Jena, 1805–6), tr. L. Rauch 1983. Third Jena system.
  - Available online: English text (in part)
- Phenomenology of Spirit (Jena, 1807), tr. A.V. Miller 1977,
  - Looser but more readable translation, as The Phenomenology of Mind, tr. J.B. Baillie 1910, revised 1931.
  - Available online: German text, German text on a single page, Baillie translation, Baillie translation
  - The Phenomenology of Spirit (Cambridge Hegel Translations), translated by Terry Pinkard (Cambridge University Press, 2018) ISBN 0521855799
  - The Phenomenology of Spirit: Translated with Introduction and Commentary, translated by Michael Inwood (Oxford University Press, 2018) ISBN 0198790627
  - Spirit: Book Six of Hegel's Phenomenology of Spirit, (ed.) D.E. Shannon, 2001

=== Nürnberg period ===
- The Philosophical Propaedeutic (Nürnberg, 1808–11), tr. A.V. Miller, 1986.
  - Available online: Section on Phenomenology, Section on Logic
- Science of Logic (Nürnberg, 1812–16, rev. Berlin 1831),
  - tr. A.V. Miller 1969 pb
  - 2 volumes, tr. W.H. Johnston and L.G. Struthers 1929.
  - Available online: German text part 1, part 2, Miller translation (extracts)

=== Heidelberg period ===
- Encyclopaedia of the Philosophical Sciences in Outline (Heidelberg 1817), tr. S.H. Taubeneck 1990.
  - This includes the Encyclopaedia Logic, Philosophy of Nature and Philosophy of Mind
- Encyclopaedia Logic (also known as Shorter Logic) (Heidelberg, 1817, rev. Berlin 1827, 1830), tr. T.F. Geraets et al. 1991 pb,
  - or in a much worse translation, as Hegel's Logic or The Logic of Hegel, tr. W. Wallace 1873, reprinted 1975,
  - Available online: German text, Wallace translation
- Encyclopaedia Philosophy of Nature (Heidelberg, 1817, rev. Berlin, 1827, 1830)
  - as The Philosophy of Nature, tr. A.V. Miller 1970,
  - In a better translation with a plethora of explanatory notes, in 3 volumes, tr. M.J. Petry 1970
  - Available online: German text, Taubeneck translation of 1817 edition
- Encyclopaedia Philosophy of Spirit (Heidelberg, 1817, rev. Berlin, 1827, 1830)
  - as Hegel's Philosophy of Mind, tr. W. Wallace 1894, republished with additions, tr. A.V. Miller 1971 pb.
  - With the German on opposite pages and an 1825 set of students lecture notes as an appendix, as Hegel's Philosophy of Subjective Spirit, 3 volumes, tr. M.J. Petry 1978.
  - Petry republished the section on Phenomenology, with the 1825 lecture notes interpolated between the paragraphs of Hegel's text instead of the usual additions, as The Berlin Phenomenology 1981
  - Available online: German text, Wallace translation
- Lectures on Natural Right and Political Science (Heidelberg, 1817–18), tr. J.M. Stewart and P.C. Hodgson 1995

=== Berlin period ===
- Philosophy of Right (Berlin, 1821)
  - Elements of the Philosophy of Right, tr. H.B. Nisbet 1991 pb, preferable to the older translations
  - Hegel's Philosophy of Right, tr. T. Knox 1952 pb, and, tr. Dyde 1897. Available online
- Lectures on the Philosophy of History (Berlin, 1820s) as
  - The Philosophy of History, tr. J. Sibree 1858, revised 1899, reprinted 1956 pb.
  - The introduction is published separately, in much better translations than Sibree's,
  - Reason in History, tr. R.S. Hartman 1953,
  - Introduction to the Philosophy of History, tr. L. Rauch 1988 pb;
  - Lectures on the Philosophy of World History, Introduction: Reason in History, tr. H.B. Nisbet 1975 pb. More complete version of introduction. Available online: Sibree translation of introduction.
  - A new translation is now available: Lectures on the Philosophy of History, trans. Ruben Alvarado.
- Lectures on Aesthetics (Berlin, 1820s), as
  - Hegel's Aesthetics, 2 volumes, tr. T.M. Knox 1979.
  - The introduction is published separately as Introductory Lectures on Aesthetics, tr. B. Bosanquet 1886, reissued 1993 pb, and also as
  - Hegel's Introduction to Aesthetics, tr. T.M. Knox 1979.
  - Available online: Knox translation of whole text
- Lectures on the Philosophy of Religion (Berlin, 1821–31), 3 volumes, tr. P.C. Hodgson et al. 1984–87.
  - Preferable to the older version, tr. E.B. Speirs and J.B. Sanderson 1895, reprinted 1968.
  - Available online: Speirs and Sanderson translation (introduction)
  - Lectures on the Philosophy of Religion: One-volume Edition, The Lectures of 1827 (Berlin, 1827), tr. P.C. Hodgson et al. 1988.
  - The 1827 version of the lectures extracted from the 3-volume edition
- Lectures on the Proofs of the Existence of God, tr. P.C. Hodgson 2007
- Lectures on the History of Philosophy (Berlin, 1820s), 3 volumes, tr. E. S. Haldane and F. Simson 1892–96, reprinted 1995 pb.
  - A more accurate version of volume 3 is published as Lectures on the History of Philosophy: The Lectures of 1825-26. Volume 3: Medieval and Modern Philosophy, tr. R. F. Brown and J. M. Stewart 1990.
  - The various introductions are translated separately as Introduction to the Lectures on the History of Philosophy, tr. T.M. Knox and A.V. Miller 1985 pb.
  - Available online: Haldane and Simson translation (selections)

=== Other ===
- Hegel: The Letters, tr. C. Butler and C. Seiler 1984
- Oldest Systematic Program of German Idealism. Scholars claimed the author is Hegel. The manuscript is clearly handwritten by Hegel around 1796. Some scholars have dated earlier or later by a few years. The actual text is about 700 words; not dated nor signed. Note: authorship of this text is highly debated. The text is include in the published collected writings of Hegel, Schelling, and F. Hölderlin. In German, see Frank-Peter Hansen. Das älteste Systemprogramm des deutschen Idealismus. Rezeptionsgeschichte und Interpretation. 1989, 2014. ISBN 978-3110118094. Berlin New York: Walter de Gruyter. Pages 1–514. In English, see Oldest Systematic Program of German Idealism: Translation and Notes by Daniel Fidel Ferrer. 2021. Pages 1–123. A very detailed discussion and analysis of the handwritten manuscript, see Das Älteste Systemprogramm des deutschen Idealismus - neue Transkription by Christoph v. Wolzogen.
- Political Writings, edited by Laurence Dickey, Professor of History, University of Wisconsin-Madison and H B Nisbet, Professor of Modern Languages, University of Cambridge, and Fellow of Sidney Sussex College. Translated: by H B Nisbet, Cambridge University Press.
  - The German Constitution (Die Verfassung Deutschlands)

== Translations of minor works ==
=== Jena period ===
- Two fragments of 1797 on love (1797), Clio 8 (2), 1979
- Two fragments on the ideal of social life (1799–1800), Clio 10 (4), 1981
- The relationship of skepticism to philosophy (1801), in G. di Giovanni and H.S. Harris, tr. Between Kant and Hegel: Texts in the Development of Post-Kantian Idealism, 1985
- On the nature of philosophical critique (1802), partly translated in M.N. Forster, Hegel's Idea of a Phenomenology of Spirit, 1998, pp. 605–607
- Aphorisms from the wastebook (1803–1806), Independent Journal of Philosophy 3, 1979
- "Who Thinks Abstractly?" (1807–1808), in Walter Kaufmann's Hegel: Reinterpretation, Texts and Commentary, pp. 461–465. Available online: German text, English text

=== Berlin period ===
- Reason and religious truth (1821), foreword to H. Hinrich's Religion in its Inner Relation to Science, in F. Weiss (ed.) Beyond Epistemology: New Studies in the Philosophy of Hegel, pp. 227–244. Available online: German text
- Miscellaneous Writings of G.W.F. Hegel, (ed.) J. Stewart (2000)

== Untranslated or only recently translated ==
A number of student lecture notes from Hegel's classes remain untranslated:

- VPR: Vorlesungen über Rechtsphilosophie (Lectures on the Philosophy of Right) Edited by K.-H. Ilting. Stuttgart: Frommann Verlag, 1974. 4 volumes; cited by volume and page number.
- VPR17: Die Philosophie des Rechts: Die Mitschriften Wannenmann (Heidelberg, 1817–1818) und Homeyer (Berlin 1818–1819). Edited by K.-H. Ilting. Stuttgart: Klett-Cotta Verlag, 1983.
- VPR19: Philosophie des Rechts: Die Vorlesung von 1819/1820. Edited by Dieter Henrich. Frankfurt: Suhrkamp Verlag, 1983.
- Carovés Hegel-Mitschriften (Heidelberg, 1816–1818). Planned edition by Klaus Vieweg, Christian Illies and Marko Fuchs.
