= Mohamed Habib Marzouki =

Tunisian philosopher (born 1947)

Prof. Mohamed al-Habib al-Marzouki
- محمد الحبيب المرزوقي
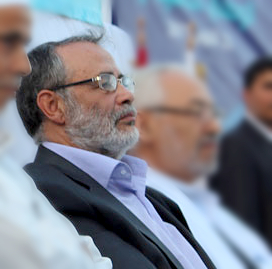
- Mohamed Habib Marzouki in 2012
- Born: May 29, 1947 (age 79); Ferryville, French Protectorate of Tunisia
- Other name: Abu Yaareb al-Marzouki

Academic background
- Education: Sorbonne University
- Thesis: (1972)

Academic work
- Discipline: Philosopher
- Sub-discipline: Greek philosophy; Arabic philosophy; German philosophy; Islamic philosophy
- Main interests: Philosophy of Religion; Political Philosophy; Islamic Philosophy
- Website: https://abuyaareb.org

Mohamed Habib Marzouki (Arabic: محمد الحبيب المرزوقي; also, Abu Yaareb al-Marzouki and Abou Yaareb al-Marzouki; born 29 May 1947) is a Tunisian academic, philosopher and translator. Along with intellectual work, he involved in politics for a short time following the Jasmine revolution. Resigning only a year later, he declared his intention to step out of political work for good and count on writing to incite social change.

A central theme of Marzouki's thought is reconciling, or even unifying, philosophy and religion. According to him, ending the conflict between philosophy and religion (or Islam in particular), which he believes is an ancient one, is the only possible way to bring about actual reform in the Islamic world in particular, and the world in general. To achieve the "civilizational revival of the Islamic nation, he argues, Muslim nations must overcome the ideas of Arabic Renaissance so that they can resume what he calls their current civilizational mission in the context of globalization, holding that "without strong and independent economies and serious ethics of work, social growth may remain a wishful thinking".

== Early life and education ==
He was born in Ferryville, French Protectorate of Tunisia. The thirteenth in a family of fifteen children, he received a PhD in philosophy from the Sorbonne University in 1972. He taught at the University of Tunis between 1980 and 2006 and at the International Islamic University of Malaysia.

== Political career ==
He was elected to the Constituent Assembly as a representative of the Islamist party Ennahda for the district of Tunis on 23 October 2011, and was subsequently appointed advisor, with cabinet rank, to the Culture and the Education ministers. He later resigned from the assembly on 6 March 2013, and returned to teaching philosophy. Upon retirement, he left a bitter note to conclude his experience in which he accused Ennahda, then-governing party, of nepotism and exploiting power as if it were a "spoil of war".

== Views ==
In his writings, Marzouki is keen on commenting on the significant goings-on of social and political life, along with the abstract problems that make up the body of his output.

He considered the 2023 Quran desecration in Sweden a sign for a defensive position in the lay West towards a growing inclination to Islam among the elite. He also commended Turkey for its balanced position between the East and West.

== Bibliography ==
=== Own works ===
1. — (1994). Isla'h al-'Aql fi al-Falsafah al-'Arabiyyah: Min waqi'iyyat Aflatun wa Aristo Ila Ismiyyat Ibn Taymiyyah wa Ibn Khaldun إصلاح العقل في الفلسفة العربية: من واقعية أفلاطون وأرسطو إلى اسمية ابن تيمية وابن خلدون [Reformation of Reason in Arabic Philosophy: from the Realism of Plato and Aristotle to the Nominalism of Ibn Taymiyyah and Ibn Khaldun]. Beirut: Center for Arab Unity Studies. OCLC 34184057.
2. — (2000). Fi al-'Ilaqah bayna al-Shi'ir al-Mutlaq wa al-I'ijaz al-Qur'ani في العلاقة بين الشعر المطلق والإعجاز القرآني [On the Relationship between Absolute Poetry and the Quranic Miracle]. Beirut: Dar al-Taliaa.
3. — (2001). Tajalliyat al-Falsafah al-'Arabiyyah تجليات الفلسفة العربية [Manifestations of Arabic Philosophy]. Damascus: Dar al-Fikr. ISBN 1-57547-960-5.
4. — (2001). Wi'hdat al-Fikrayn al-Dini wa al-Falsafi وحدة الفكرين الديني والفلسفي [Unity of Philosophical and Religious thoughts]. Damascus; Beirut: Dar al-Fikr; Dar al-Fikr al-Mu'aasir.
5. — (2006). Falsafat al-Din min Manẓour al-Fikr al-Islami فلسفة الدين من منظور الفكر الإسلامي [Philosophy of Religion from the Perspective of Islamic Thought]. Beirut: Dar al-Hadi.

=== Co-authored ===
1. with Tizini, Tayyeb (2001). Afaq Falsafiyyah 'Arabiyyah Mu'aasirah آفاق فلسفية عربية معاصرة [Contemporary Arabic Philosophical Horizons]. Damascus; Beirut: Dar al-Fikr; Dar al-Fikr al-Mu'aasir.
2. with Hanafi, Hassan (2003). al-Naẓar wa al-'Amal wa al-Ma'ziq al-'haḍari al-'Arabi wa al-Islami al-Rahin النظر والعمل والمأزق الحضاري العربي الإسلامي الراهن [Theory and Practice, and the Current Islamo-Arabic Civilizational Crisis]. Damascus; Beirut: Dar al-Fikr; Dar al-Fikr al-Mu'aasir.
3. with Bouti, Muhammad (2013). Ishkaliyyat Tajdid Usul al-Fiqh إشكالية تجديد أصول الفقه [Problem of Reestablishing Principles of Jurisdiction]. Damascus; Beirut: Dar al-Fikr; Dar al-Fikr al-Mu'aasir. ISBN 978-9933-10-460-3.

=== Translations ===
==== from German ====
1. Husserl, Edmund (2011). Afkar Mumahhida li 'ilm al-ẓahiriyyat al-khalis wa lil falsafah al-ẓahiriyyatiyyah أفكار ممهدة لعلم الظاهريات الخالص وللفلسفة الظاهرياتية [Ideas Pertaining to a Pure Phenomenology and to a Phenomenological Philosophy]. Translated by Marzouki, Abu Yaareb. Beirut: Jadawel. ISBN 978-614-418-044-0. This translation was winner of Sheikh Zayed Book Award in 2012.
2. Lectures on the Philosophy of Religion, published in two volumes:
  - Hegel, Georg Wilhelm Friedrich (2014). Jadaliyyat ad-Din wa at-Tanweer جدلية الدين والتنوير [Dialectic of Religion and Enlightenment]. Translated by Marzouki, Abu Yaareb. Abu Dhabi: Kalima project. ISBN 978-9948-17-312-0.
  - Hegel, Georg Wilhelm Friedrich (2015). Takweeniyyat al-Wa'ay al-Insani wa al-Deeni تكوينية الوعي الإنساني والديني [Genesis of Human and Religious Perception]. Translated by Marzouki, Abu Yaareb. Abu Dhabi: Kalima project. ISBN 978-9948-22-766-3.
3. Wulf, Christoph (2009). ʻIlm al-ʼAnāsah: al-Tārīkh wa-al-Thaqāfah wa-al-Falsafah علم الأناسة: التاريخ والثقافة والفلسفة [Anthropology: History, Culture, and Philosophy] (in Arabic). Abu Dhabi; Ariana: Kalima (ADACH); Mediterranean Publisher. ISBN 9789973889904.
4. Kuschel, Karl-Josef (2009). al-Adyān min al-Tanāzuʻ ilá al-Tanāfus: lāsynj wa-Taḥaddī al-Islām الأديان من التنازع إلى التنافس: لاسينج وتحدي الإسلام [From Conflict to Competition of Religions: Lessing and the Challenge of Islam] (in Arabic). Translated by Marzouki, Abu yaareb; al-Fandari, Munir. Abu Dhabi: Kalima (ADACH). ISBN 9789948014478.

==== from English ====
1. Quine, Willard Van Orman (1996). Basit al-Mantiq al-'Hadith بسيط المنطق الحديث [Elementary Logic]. Translated by Marzouki, Abu Yaareb. Beirut: Dar al-Taliaa.
2. Holton, Woody (2010). al-Amrikiyyon al-Jawami'h wa Usul al-Dostur al-Amriki الأمريكيون الجوامح وأصول الدستور الأمريكي [Unruly Americans and the Origins of the Constitution]. Translated by Marzouki, Abu Yaareb. Abu Dhabi: Kalima project. ISBN 978-9948-01-586-4.

==== from French ====
1. Duhem, Pierre (2005). "Masadir al-Falsafah al-'Arabiyyah" مصادر الفلسفة العربية [Resources of Arabian Philosophy]. Le système du monde [The System of World]. Translated by Marzouki, Abu Yaareb. Damascus: Dar al-Fikr. ISBN 1-59239-476-0.
