= Moggach =

Moggach is a surname. Notable people with the surname include:

- Deborah Moggach (born 1948), English novelist and screenwriter
- Douglas Moggach, Canadian philosopher
- Lottie Moggach, English journalist and author
