= The Jewish Question =

1843 theological book by Bruno Bauer

The Jewish Question is an 1843 book by German historian and theologian Bruno Bauer, written and published in German (original title Die Judenfrage).

Bauer argued that Jews can achieve political emancipation only if they relinquish their particular religious consciousness, since political emancipation requires a secular state, which he assumes does not leave any "space" for social identities such as religion. According to Bauer, such religious demands are incompatible with the idea of the "Rights of Man." True political emancipation, for Bauer, requires the abolition of religion. He described the contemporary concept of Jewish nationalism as "chimerical" and "baseless", as, according to him, Judaism is a primitive stage of development that would require surmounting one more stage than Christians before reaching the state of renouncing religion.

== See also ==
- Jewish Question
- On the Jewish Question

== Bibliography ==
- The Marxists and the Jewish Question: The History of a Debate 1843 ISBN 1573923273
