= Jewish question =

Debate about the status of Jews in Europe

The Jewish question was a wide-ranging debate in 19th- and 20th-century Europe that pertained to the appropriate status and treatment of Jews. The debate, which was similar to other "national questions", dealt with the civil, legal, national, and political status of Jews as a minority within society, particularly in Europe during the 18th, 19th, and 20th centuries.

The debate began with Jewish emancipation in western and central European societies during the Age of Enlightenment and after the French Revolution. The debate's issues included legal and economic Jewish disabilities (such as Jewish quotas and segregation), Jewish assimilation, and Jewish Enlightenment.

The expression has been used by antisemitic movements from the 1880s onwards, culminating in the Holocaust (1941–45), specifically a Nazi plan called the "Final Solution to the Jewish Question". Similarly, the expression was used by proponents for, and opponents of, the establishment of an autonomous Jewish homeland or a sovereign Jewish state, leading to the state of Israel in 1948.

== History ==
The term "Jewish question" was first used in Great Britain around 1750 when the expression was used during the debates related to the Jewish Naturalisation Act 1753. According to Holocaust scholar Lucy Dawidowicz, the term "Jewish Question", as introduced in western Europe, was a neutral expression for the negative attitude toward the apparent and persistent singularity of the Jews as a people against the background of the rising political nationalism and new nation-states. Dawidowicz writes that "the histories of Jewish emancipation and of European antisemitism are replete with proffered 'solutions to the Jewish question.'"

The question was next discussed in France (la question juive) after the French Revolution in 1789. It was discussed in Germany in 1843 via Bruno Bauer's treatise Die Judenfrage ('The Jewish Question'). He argued that Jews could achieve political emancipation only if they let go their religious consciousness, as he proposed that political emancipation required a secular state. Bauer's conclusions were disputed by Karl Marx in his essay Zur Judenfrage, in which he argued that Jewish political emancipation was possible because a secular state presupposes and sustains the private religious life of its citizens. Yet he still maintained that the abolition of capitalism would bring about the end of Judaism: "The existence of religion is not in contradiction to the perfection of the state... [However] once society has succeeded in abolishing the empirical essence of Judaism – huckstering and its preconditions – the Jew will have become impossible, because his consciousness no longer has an object."

According to Otto Dov Kulka of Hebrew University, the term became widespread in the 19th century when it was used in discussions about Jewish emancipation in Germany (Judenfrage). In the 19th century hundreds of tractates, pamphlets, newspaper articles and books were written on the subject, with many offering such solutions as resettlement, deportation, or assimilation of the Jewish population. Similarly, hundreds of works were written opposing these solutions and offering instead solutions such as re-integration and education. This debate however, could not decide whether the problem of the Jewish question had more to do with the problems posed by the German Jews' opponents or vice versa: the problem posed by the existence of the German Jews to their opponents.

From around 1860, the term was used with an increasingly antisemitic tendency: Jews were described under this term as a stumbling block to the identity and cohesion of the German nation and as enemies within the Germans' own country. Antisemites such as Wilhelm Marr, Karl Eugen Dühring, Theodor Fritsch, Houston Stewart Chamberlain, Paul de Lagarde and others declared it a racial problem insoluble through integration. They stressed this in order to strengthen their demands to "de-jewify" the press, education, culture, state and economy. They also proposed to condemn inter-marriage between Jews and non-Jews. They used this term to oust the Jews from their supposedly socially dominant positions.

The topic was also taken up by Jews themselves. Theodor Herzl's 1896 treatise Der Judenstaat advocates Zionism as a "modern solution for the Jewish question" by creating an independent Jewish state, preferably in Ottoman-controlled Palestine. The 1934 science fiction novel Zwei im andern Land by the German rabbi Martin Salomonski imagines a refuge for Jews on the moon.

The most infamous use of this expression was by the Nazis in the early- and mid-twentieth century. They implemented what they called their "Final Solution to the Jewish question" through the Holocaust during World War II, when they attempted to exterminate Jews in Europe.

== Bruno Bauer – The Jewish Question ==
In his book The Jewish Question (1843), Bauer argued that Jews could only achieve political emancipation if they relinquished their particular religious consciousness. He believed that political emancipation required a secular state, and such a state did not leave any "space" for social identities such as religion. According to Bauer, such religious demands were incompatible with the idea of the "Rights of Man". True political emancipation, for Bauer, required the abolition of religion.

== Karl Marx – On the Jewish Question ==
Karl Marx replied to Bauer in his 1844 essay On the Jewish Question. Marx repudiated Bauer's view that the nature of the Jewish religion prevented assimilation by Jews. Instead, Marx attacked Bauer's very formulation of the question from "can the Jews become politically emancipated?" as fundamentally masking the nature of political emancipation itself.

Marx used Bauer's essay as an occasion for his own analysis of liberal rights. Marx argued that Bauer was mistaken in his assumption that in a "secular state", religion would no longer play a prominent role in social life. As an example, he referred to the pervasiveness of religion in the United States, which, unlike Prussia, had no state religion. In Marx's analysis, the "secular state" was not opposed to religion, but rather assumed it. The removal of religious or property qualifications for citizenship did not mean the abolition of religion or property, but rather naturalized both and introduced a way of regarding individuals in abstraction from them. On this note Marx moved beyond the question of religious freedom to his real concern with Bauer's analysis of "political emancipation." Marx concluded that while individuals can be 'politically' free in a secular state, they were still bound to material constraints on freedom by economic inequality, an assumption that would later form the basis of his critiques of capitalism.

== After Marx ==
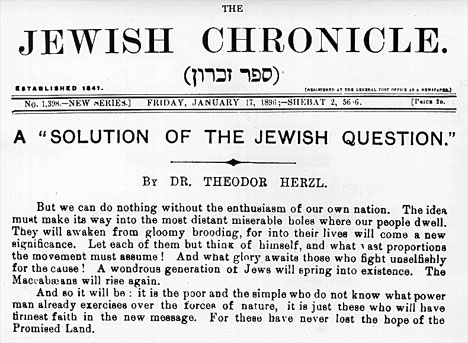
The Jewish Chronicle promoting Herzl's Judenstaat as "a 'solution of the Jewish question.'"

Werner Sombart praised Jews for their capitalism and presented the seventeenth–eighteenth century court Jews as integrated and a model for integration. By the turn of the twentieth century, the debate was still widely discussed. The Dreyfus Affair in France, believed to be evidence of antisemitism, increased the prominence of this issue. Theodor Herzl proposed the advancement of a separate Jewish state and the Zionist cause.

== The Nazi "Final Solution" ==
In Nazi Germany, the term Jewish Question (in German: Judenfrage) referred to the belief that the existence of Jews in Germany posed a problem for the state. In 1933 two Nazi theorists, Johann von Leers and Achim Gercke, both proposed the idea that the Jewish Question could be solved by resettling Jews in Madagascar, or somewhere else in Africa or South America. They also discussed the pros and cons of supporting the German Zionists. Von Leers asserted that establishing a Jewish homeland in Mandatory Palestine would create humanitarian and political problems for the region.

Upon achieving power in 1933, Adolf Hitler and the Nazi state began to implement increasingly severe legislation that was aimed at segregating and ultimately removing Jews from Germany and (eventually) all of Europe. The next stage was the persecution of the Jews and the stripping of their citizenship through the 1935 Nuremberg Laws. Starting with 1938 Kristallnacht pogrom and later, during World War II, it became state-sponsored internment in Nazi concentration camps. Finally the government implemented the systematic extermination of the Jewish people (The Holocaust), which took place as the so-called Final Solution to the Jewish Question. (Note: For some extra depth, see Wannsee Conference.)

Nazi propaganda was produced in order to manipulate the public, the most notable examples of which were based on the writings of people such as Eugen Fischer, Fritz Lenz and Erwin Baur in Foundations of Human Heredity Teaching and Racial Hygiene. The work Die Freigabe der Vernichtung lebensunwerten Lebens (Allowing the Destruction of Life Unworthy of Living) by Karl Binding and Alfred Hoche and the pseudo-scholarship that was promoted by Gerhard Kittel also played a role. In occupied France, the collaborationist regime established its own Institute for studying the Jewish Questions.

== In the United States ==
According to historians Ronald J. Jensen and Stuart Knee, by the 1870s Russian-American relations were strained by the mistreatment of American Jewish visitors in Russia. President Ulysses S. Grant responded to American Jewish requests for action to protect visitors. By the 1880s, the outbreak of antisemitic pogroms in Russia and consequent mass emigration of Jews to New York made relations worse. After 1880, escalating pogroms alienated both elite opinion and public opinion in the U.S. In 1903, the Kishinev pogrom killed 47 Jews, injured 400, and left 10,000 homeless and dependent on relief. American Jews began large-scale organized financial help and assisted in emigration from Russia. More violence in Russia led in 1911 to the United States repealing an 1832 commercial treaty.

In the 1920s, according to historian Leo Ribuffo, auto magnate Henry Ford sponsored a major outburst of attacks on Jews in his magazine, the Dearborn Independent, bundles of which he sent to all Ford dealerships every week. It especially promoted The Protocols of the Elders of Zion, and also published new articles that blamed Jews for America's problems. In 1927, following a lawsuit by Aaron Sapiro, Ford publicly apologized for his antisemitism, retracted his earlier views, and closed his magazine.

A "Jewish problem" was discussed in majority-European countries outside Europe, even as the Holocaust was in progress. American aviator and celebrity Charles A. Lindbergh used the phrase repeatedly in public speeches and writing. For example in his diary entry of September 18, 1941, published in 1970 as part of The Wartime Journals of Charles A. Lindbergh, he wrote

[John T.] Flynn says he does not question the truth of what I said at Des Moines, but feels it was inadvisable to mention the Jewish problem. It is difficult for me to understand Flynn's attitude. He feels as strongly as I do that the Jews are among the major influences pushing this country toward war. He has said so frequently and he says so now. He is perfectly willing to talk about it among a small group of people in private.

== Contemporary use ==
A dominant antisemitic conspiracy theory is the belief that Jewish people have undue influence over the media, banking, and politics. Based on this conspiracy theory, certain groups and activists discuss the "Jewish Question" and offer different proposals to address it. In the early 21st century, white nationalists, alt-righters, and neo-Nazis have used the initialism JQ in order to refer to the Jewish question.

== See also ==
- Anti-Semite and Jew
- Antisemitic canard
- Armenian question
- David Nirenberg § Anti-Judaism
- German question
- Irish question
- Martin Luther and antisemitism
- National question
- Negro Question
- Polish question
- The Race Question
- Ulrich Fleischhauer
- Useful Jew
- Wannsee Conference
- "Reflections on the Jewish Question" by Jean-Paul Sartre
