= Lectures on the Philosophy of Religion =

1832 work by German philosopher Hegel

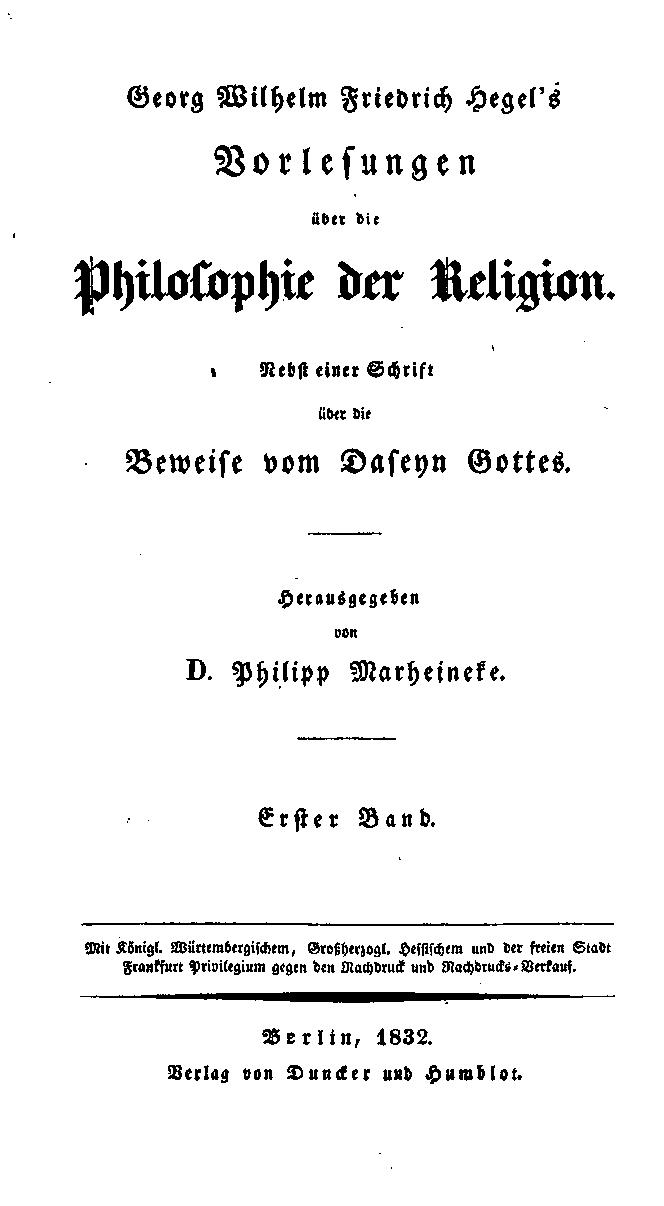
Title page of the first edition, 1832.

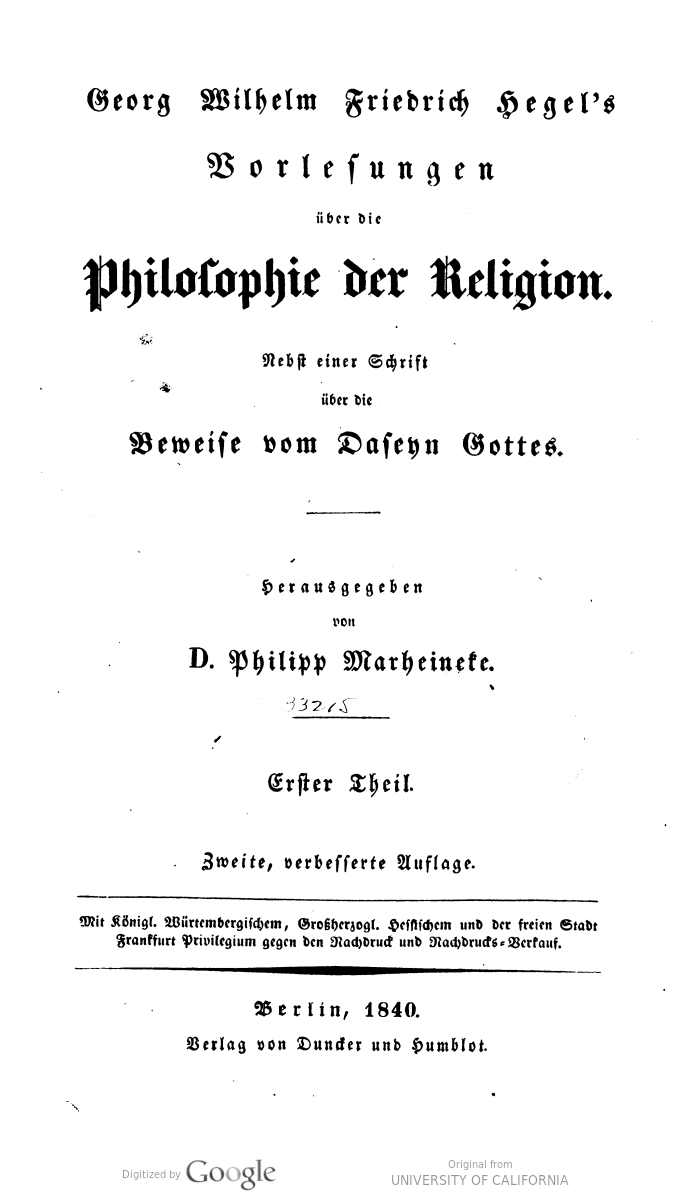
Title page of the 1840 German edition.

Georg Wilhelm Friedrich Hegel's Lectures on the Philosophy of Religion (German: Vorlesungen über die Philosophie der Religion) outlines his ideas on Christianity as a form of the self-consciousness of the community. They represent the final and in some ways the decisive element of his philosophical system. In light of his distinctive philosophical approach, using a method that is dialectical and historical, Hegel offers a radical reinterpretation of the meaning of Christianity and its characteristic doctrines. The approach taken in these lectures is to some extent prefigured in Hegel's first published book, The Phenomenology of Spirit (1807).

== Publication history ==
Hegel's conception and execution of the lectures differed significantly on each of the occasions he delivered them, in 1821, 1824, 1827, and 1831.

The first German edition was published at Berlin in 1832, the year after Hegel's death, as part of the posthumous Werke series. The book was rather hastily put together by Philip Marheineke, mainly from students' copies of the lectures delivered during different sessions, though it also contained matter taken from notes and outlines in Hegel's own handwriting.

In 1840, two of the Young Hegelians, Bruno Bauer and Karl Marx, began work on a second edition, which appeared under Marheineke's name. In the preparation of this second edition, the editors drew largely on several important papers found amongst Hegel's manuscripts, in which his ideas were developed in much greater detail than in any of the sketches previously used, including the "Lectures on the Proofs of the Existence of God," which Hegel was revising for the press when he died. Marheineke had also fresh and very complete copies of the lectures made by some of Hegel's most distinguished pupils.

Yet, the book in the form in which we have it, remains an editorial compilation. No part of it, not even the part which is Hegel's actual composition, was intended for publication, and the informal and discursive character of the Lectures is apparent.

In 1895, Ms. J. Burdon Sanderson and Rev. Ebenezer Brown Speirs published the first English translation in three volumes including the work on the proofs of the existence of God. This edition used 1840s copy to produce the translation.

In the 1920s, Georg Lasson published a new edition within the Sämtliche Werke series. It used special types to differentiate the text of Hegel's manuscripts, from his students' notes, but stitched lectures from different session together, and cut out what Lasson viewed as repetitions. Although the result is not always praised today, his edition is useful to researches as he had access to manuscripts that have since been lost.

In 1990, Oxford University Press published a critical edition, separating the series of lectures and presenting them as independent units on the basis of a complete re-editing of the sources by Walter Jaeschke. This English translation was prepared by a team consisting of Robert F. Brown, Peter C. Hodgson, and J. Michael Stewart, with the assistance of H. S. Harris. The three volumes include editorial introductions, critical annotations on the text, textual variants, tables, bibliography, and glossary.

In 2001–2004, Mugahid Abdulmonem Mugahid, a relatively unnotable Egyptian scholar, published for the first-time an Arabic translation of the lectures based on Sanderson's translation. This edition was divided into a series of 9 volumes.

In 2014–2015, Abu Yaareb al-Marzouki published a critical Arabic translation of the lectures in two volumes. These were re-titled Dialectic of Religion and Enlightenment and Genesis of Human and Religious Perception. Abu Yaareb relied on Lasson's edition for the editorial process and on Suhrkamp Verlag's copy for the general layout. He gave extensive criticism in his preliminary remarks and highlighted the importance of this work.

== Content ==
"The Consummate [or Absolute] Religion" is Hegel's name for Christianity, which he also designates "the Revelatory [or Revealed] Religion." In these lectures, he offers a speculative reinterpretation of major Christian doctrines: the Trinity, the Creation, humanity, estrangement and evil, Christ, the Spirit, the spiritual community, church and world. These interpretations have had a powerful and controversial impact on modern theology.

Hegel expanded on Luther's idea of Christian liberty. He touches on pantheism, and discusses religions of India, China, Ancient Egypt, Ancient Greece, and Ancient Rome. It is the only work where he examines Islam. In the last of three volumes based on these lectures, Hegel discusses at length many different philosophical arguments for the existence of God.

== Reception ==
The social anthropologist Sir James George Frazer wrote in a 1910 preface to The Golden Bough, originally published in 1890, that while he had never studied Hegel, his friend James Ward, and the philosopher J. M. E. McTaggart, had both suggested to him that Hegel had anticipated his view of "the nature and historical relations of magic and religion". Frazer saw the resemblance as being that "we both hold that in the mental evolution of humanity an age of magic preceded an age of religion, and that the characteristic difference between magic and religion is that, whereas magic aims at controlling nature directly, religion aims at controlling it indirectly through the mediation of a powerful supernatural being or beings to whom man appeals for help and protection."

In his introduction to the translation, al-Marzouki emphasized the importance of reading the lectures by Muslim readers "to realize the significance of why Hegel overlooked Islam even though he discussed almost every other religion in his time". Also, he states that reading the lectures is crucial to critically overcome the Kantian transcendentalism and truly understand the relationship between Marx and Hegel.
