= Bruno Bauer =

German philosopher and theologian (1809–1882)

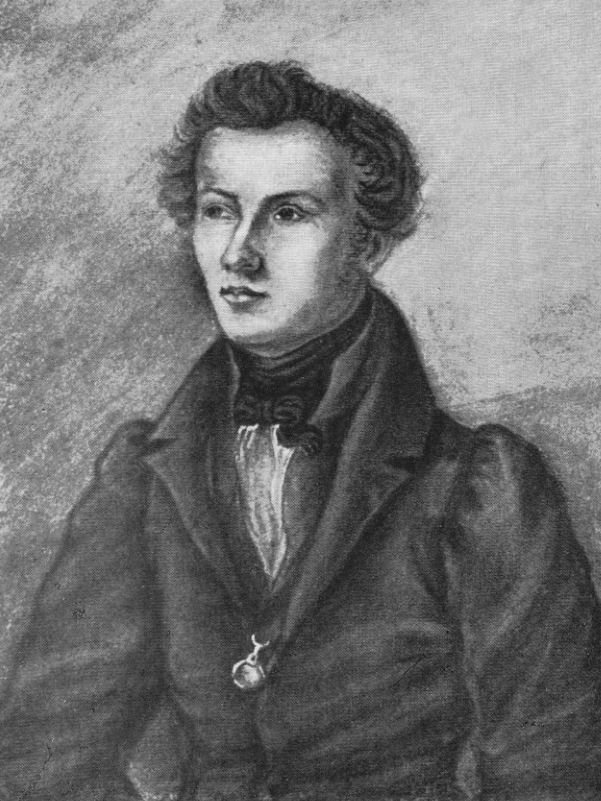
- Born: 6 September 1809; Eisenberg, Saxe-Gotha-Altenburg
- Died: 13 April 1882 (aged 72); Rixdorf, Province of Brandenburg, German Empire
- Relatives: Edgar Bauer (brother)

Education
- Education: University of Berlin (Lic./Hab., 1834)
- Academic advisor: G. W. F. Hegel

Philosophical work
- Era: 19th-century philosophy
- Region: Western philosophy
- School: Right Hegelians (1830s); Left (Young) Hegelians (1840s)
- Institutions: University of Berlin; University of Bonn
- Notable students: Karl Marx
- Main interests: Theology, political philosophy
- Notable ideas: Gospel criticism based on self-consciousness, criticism of religion as self-alienation, radical republicanism

Bruno Bauer (/ˈbaʊər/; German: [baʊɐ]; 6 September 1809 – 13 April 1882) was a German philosopher, theologian, and historian. Initially a student of Georg Wilhelm Friedrich Hegel, he became a radical rationalist critic of the Bible and Christianity, and a prominent member of the Young Hegelians. Bauer was a central figure in the intellectual circles of the Vormärz, the period preceding the Revolutions of 1848, and his philosophical work was a major influence on, and target of critique for, Karl Marx and Friedrich Engels, with whom he had a close but tumultuous relationship.

Starting as a right-wing Hegelian, Bauer shifted to the left by 1839, developing a radical critique of religion and the state. He argued that the Christian gospels were not historical records but literary works of the human self-consciousness. His most significant work of this period, The Trumpet of the Last Judgement over Hegel the Atheist and Antichrist (1841), presented Hegel's philosophy as a revolutionary atheism that called for the overthrow of all existing religious and political institutions. Bauer's political thought was a form of republicanism based on the concept of "infinite self-consciousness," an ethical idealism that advocated for the constant transformation of society in pursuit of rational freedom.

During the 1840s, Bauer engaged with the emerging social question, developing a critique of both liberalism, for its basis in private interest, and the nascent socialist movements. His controversial writings on Jewish emancipation, in which he argued that both Jews and Christians must renounce their particular religious identities to achieve universal freedom, led to his isolation from many of his former allies. Though he participated in the 1848 Revolutions, their failure led him to abandon his revolutionary republicanism and turn to conservative causes. His post-1848 work focused on historical studies, particularly the origins of Christianity, and on the political development of Russia and the rise of global imperialism. Despite the profound change in his political orientation, his work continued to influence thinkers on both the left and the right, including Karl Kautsky and Friedrich Nietzsche.

== Life and career ==
=== Early life and Hegelian studies ===
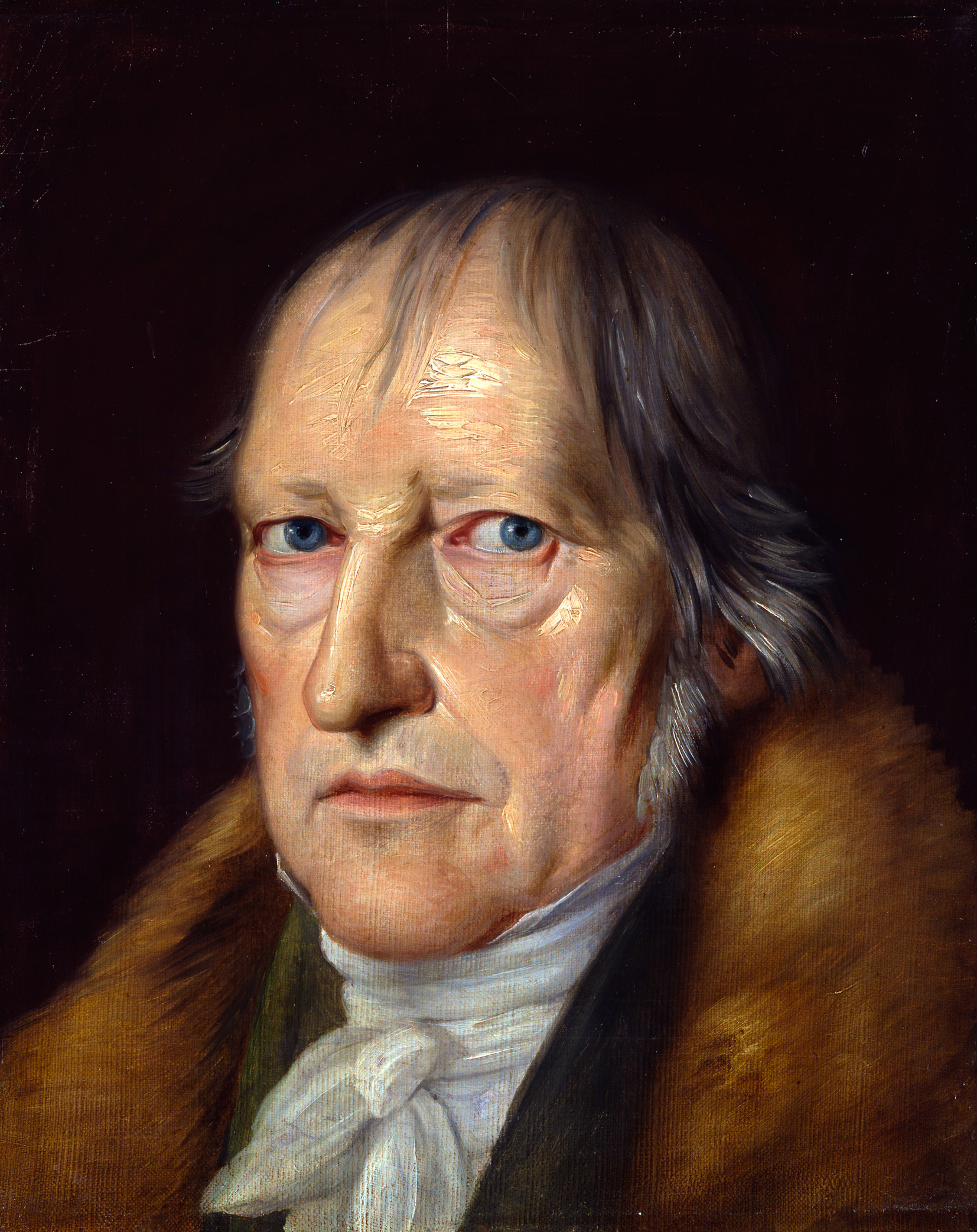
Georg Wilhelm Friedrich Hegel

Bruno Bauer was born on 6 September 1809 in Eisenberg, Thuringia. His father was a porcelain painter, and the family moved to Berlin in 1815. In 1828, Bauer enrolled as a theology student at the University of Berlin, where he studied under Georg Wilhelm Friedrich Hegel himself for three years, as well as Hegel's associates Philipp Marheineke and Henrik Steffens. Bauer was particularly disappointed with the teachings of Friedrich Schleiermacher, whose attempts to find a compromise between various conflicting schools of thought seemed to Bauer to engender only ambiguity and uncertainty.

In 1829, while still a student, Bauer won the annual Royal Prize in Philosophy on Hegel's recommendation for an essay on Immanuel Kant's aesthetics. Hegel lavished praise on the work, stating: "The lecture [...] develops most convincingly [...] there is consistent development of the thought and the author has also succeeded in exploiting the contradictions of the Kantian principles, which are incompatible." After graduating in 1832, Bauer began an academic career in theology. He became a close associate of the Hegelian school, and was entrusted with editing the second edition of Hegel's Lectures on the Philosophy of Religion (1840). He taught at Berlin from 1834 to 1839, delivering lectures on theology, the Bible, and church history, and serving as the main editor for the Zeitschrift für spekulative Theologie (Journal for Speculative Theology). During this period, his work was imbued with a spirit of conservative orthodoxy. This led him to be chosen to write the official critique of David Strauss's sensational 1835 book The Life of Jesus, in which he initially defended the historicity of the Gospels.

=== Left Hegelianism and biblical criticism ===
By 1839, Bauer had made a decisive shift to a Left Hegelian position, marked by a public break with conservative orthodoxy in his polemical work Herr Dr. Hengstenberg. In this work and others, he defended the progressive character of Hegel's system and separated the "spirit of Christianity" from its dogmatic form, undermining the religious ideology of the Prussian Restoration. This turn was influenced by his involvement with the Berlin Doktorklub (Doctors' Club), an intellectual circle of Young Hegelians that included Karl Marx, Friedrich Köppen, and others. Bauer was considered the moving spirit of this group. His increasingly radical views led the Prussian Minister of Culture, Karl vom Stein zum Altenstein, to move him to the University of Bonn in an effort to shield him from attacks in Berlin.

Bauer's radicalization intensified with his critiques of the Gospels, which he developed over a series of works from 1840 to 1842. The project began with his Critique of the Gospel of John (1840), followed by the three-volume Critique of the Synoptic Gospels (1841–42). In these works, Bauer argued that the Gospel narratives were not historical reports of the life of Jesus, but literary products of the religious consciousness of the early Christian community. He saw the evangelists not as historians but as artists who had transformed earlier religious traditions into a new, dogmatic form. He concluded that the figure of Jesus was a literary invention, a transplantation of the community's own struggles and experiences onto a single representative figure. This critique was aimed directly at the ideological foundations of the Prussian state, which used dogmatic Christianity for its legitimation.

=== Republicanism and The Trumpet of the Last Judgement ===
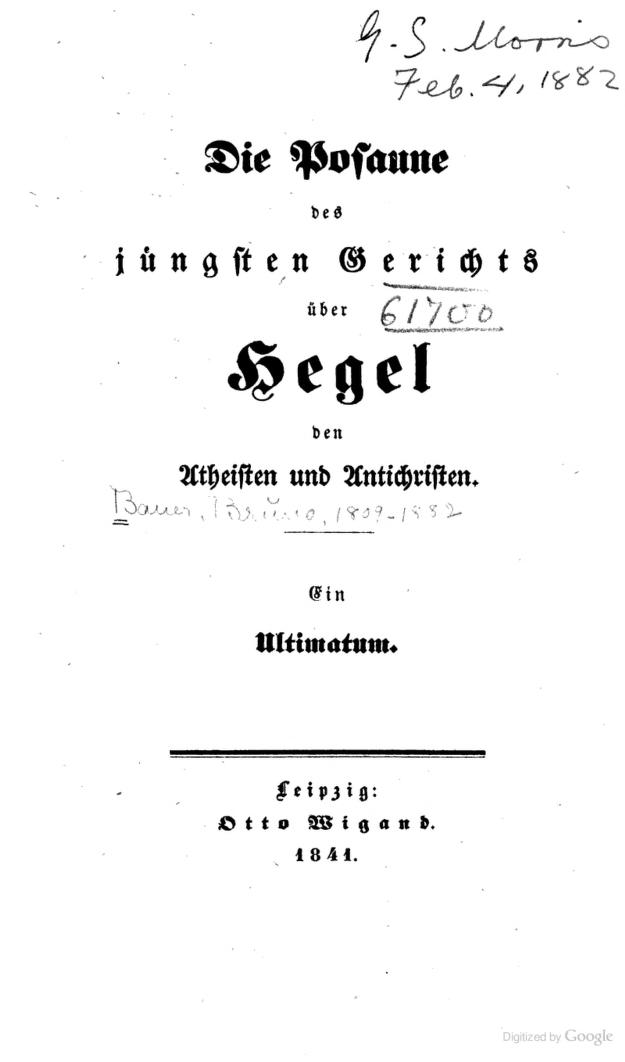
Title page of The Trumpet of the Last Judgement over Hegel the Atheist and Antichrist (1841)

In October 1841, Bauer anonymously published his most significant philosophical work of the Vormärz, Die Posaune des jüngsten Gerichts über Hegel, den Atheisten und Antichristen (The Trumpet of the Last Judgement over Hegel the Atheist and Antichrist). Described as the "locus classicus for the Young Hegelian view of Hegel," the book adopted the ironic guise of a pious pietist to denounce Hegel as a revolutionary atheist whose philosophy would inevitably lead to the destruction of religion, the state, and all social order. The book's true purpose was to reclaim Hegel for the revolutionary cause by distinguishing between an "exoteric" Hegel who accommodated existing powers and an "esoteric," atheistic Hegel whose true meaning was accessible only to his radical disciples. The book was praised by fellow Young Hegelian Arnold Ruge as a work of "world-historical importance."

In the Posaune, Bauer interpreted Hegel's philosophy as a theory of "infinite self-consciousness," a power that creates and transforms the historical world. This self-consciousness, he argued, was engaged in a constant revolutionary struggle against all "positivity"—that is, against all fixed, given, or reified institutions, whether religious or political. The book outlined a political program based on the ruthless critique of all existing relations and a refusal to compromise, culminating in the revolutionary overthrow of the old order. It advocated for a form of ethical perfectionism, a commitment to constantly transform political and social institutions in the name of freedom.

Bauer's publications caused a major controversy. In March 1842, he was dismissed from his teaching position at the University of Bonn on the initiative of the conservative minister of education, Johann Albrecht Friedrich von Eichhorn.

=== Social question and polemics ===
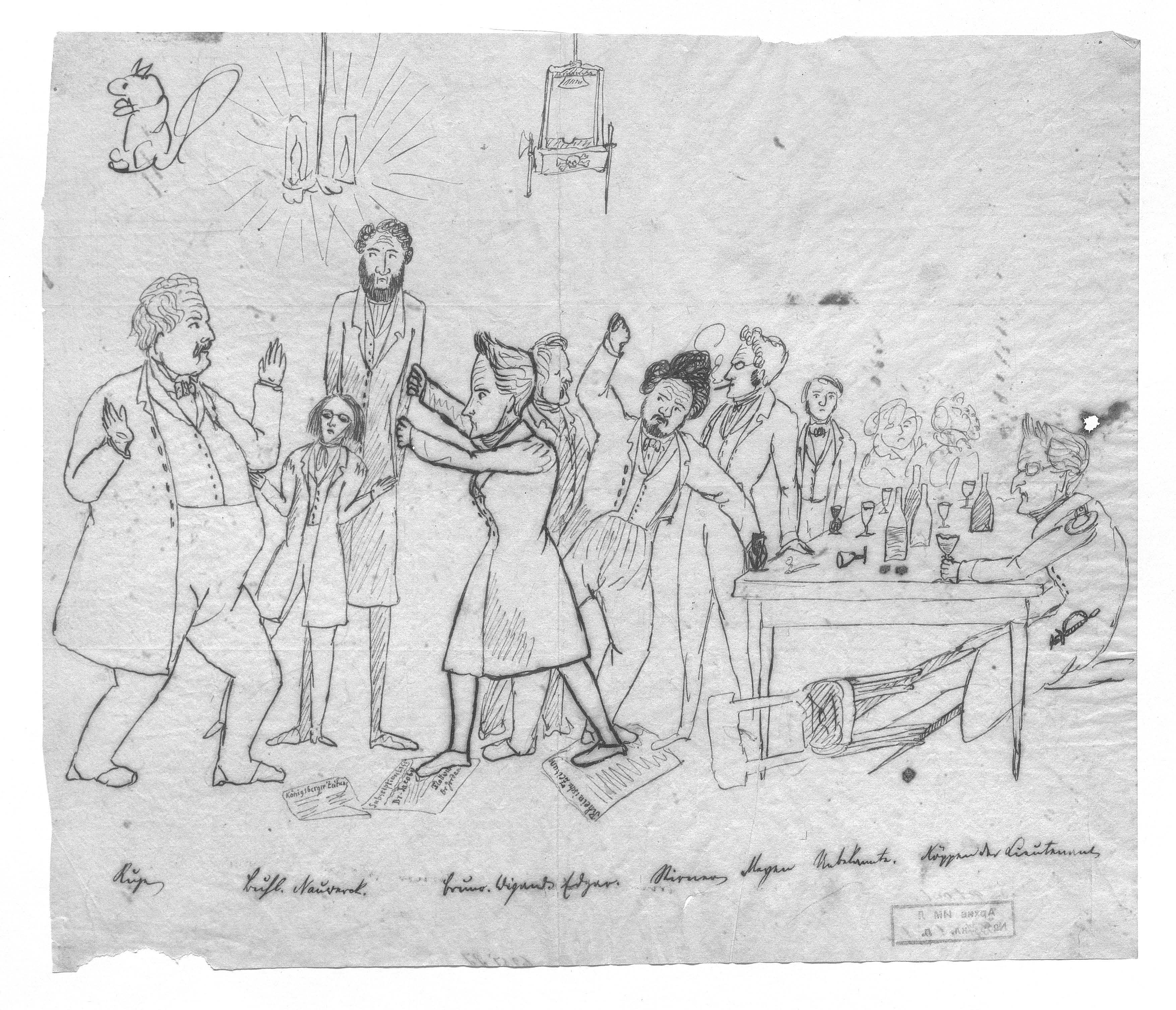
Sketch depicting the Freien by Friedrich Engels, 1842. Bauer is the fourth from the left.

After his dismissal from academia, Bauer became a leading figure among the Berlin Freien (The Free), a circle of Young Hegelians, and founded the journal Allgemeine Literatur-Zeitung to promote his ideas of "pure critique." In this period, he increasingly turned his attention to the social question and the political currents of the day. He developed a critique of both liberalism and the emerging socialist and communist movements. He saw liberalism as a defense of egoistic private interest that was incapable of genuine opposition to the authoritarian state. He critiqued socialism for what he viewed as its own form of heteronomy, arguing that communism was a dogmatic ideology that elevated the masses and their material needs over the critical spirit of the intellectual elite.

Bauer's most controversial interventions came in his 1843 writings on Jewish emancipation, Die Judenfrage (The Jewish Question) and "The Capacity of Present-Day Jews and Christians to Become Free". Arguing from his principle of universal self-consciousness, Bauer asserted that genuine freedom required the renunciation of all particularistic religious ties. He concluded that Jews, like Christians, could not be emancipated as a religious group but only as human beings, which required them to give up their religion. This position was widely seen as an attack on one of the central demands of the progressive movement. It led to his break with many former allies, including Marx, who responded with his own famous essay, "On the Jewish Question". According to Douglas Moggach, Bauer's stance on this issue was a "costly error in judgement" that stemmed from a sectarian "republican rigorism" and a "conflation of right and morality".

=== 1848 Revolutions and later life ===
Bauer was an active participant in the Revolutions of 1848. He ran for election to the Prussian National Assembly as a candidate for Charlottenburg, defending the principle of popular sovereignty and calling for the creation of a "league of equal right" that would carry the revolution into all spheres of social life. He defended the March barricade fighters in Berlin and attacked the liberal bourgeoisie for its willingness to compromise with the monarchy.

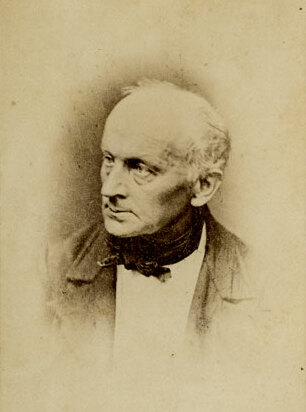
Bauer c. 1870

The failure of the revolutions led to a "profound change" in Bauer's thought. He abandoned his revolutionary republicanism and his ethics of perfectionism, becoming what was known as the "hermit of Rixdorf". His abiding anti-liberalism now led him to support conservative and, later, anti-Semitic causes, and he collaborated for many years with the reactionary editor Hermann Wagener, one of Otto von Bismarck's closest advisers. He developed a new political vision centered on the rise of global imperialism and the clash between Russia and the West. He saw Russia, with its all-encompassing unity of church and state, as a force that would shatter the particularism of Europe and create the conditions for a new, post-metaphysical era. In his later years, he developed a virulent anti-Semitism, describing the "Jewish question" as the new form of the social question and contributing to the rhetoric of racial anti-Semitism in Germany. Bauer died in Rixdorf (now part of Neukölln) on 13 April 1882.

== Philosophy ==
=== Self-consciousness and critique ===
The central concept in Bauer's philosophy during his Vormärz period was "infinite self-consciousness" (unendliches Selbstbewußtsein). For Bauer, this was not an abstract subjective state but the motive force of history itself—the dynamic, creative, and critical activity of human subjects. It is "infinite" because it constantly negates and transcends any given, finite reality or "positivity". This self-consciousness achieves its ends through critique, which for Bauer is the theoretical and practical activity of exposing the contradictions in existing institutions and ideologies. Drawing inspiration from the Aufklärung and the French Revolution, Bauer argued that critique was a form of "praxis"; it is the "terrorism of true criticism" that prepares the ground for the actualization of philosophy in the world. For Bauer, "theory is the strongest form of practice." His version of the dialectic differed from Hegel's in that it was a purely negative process of destruction, lacking Hegel's concept of aufheben (sublation), which involves preservation as well as negation.

Bauer's theory is a form of ethical and historical idealism. It is historical because the content of self-consciousness is derived from the rational comprehension of the historical process as the struggle for freedom. It is ethical because it demands a commitment to "perfectionism"—an uncompromising will to transform the world in accordance with the universal principles of reason and freedom. Bauer distinguished between the "individual self-consciousness" of particular persons and the "universal self-consciousness," which he identified with liberty and humanity. The egoistic, religious person is trapped in the former, while the goal of history is the realization of the latter.

=== Critique of religion ===
Bauer's critique of religion was a cornerstone of his philosophical and political project. He originated the term "self-alienation" (Selbstentfremdung) to describe religion as the primary form of alienated self-consciousness. In religion, he argued, humanity projects its own essential powers onto an external, transcendent being, and then worships this alienated essence as God. This process is a "division in consciousness" that stems from objective deficiencies in social and political life; religion is a "distorted consciousness of a distorted reality". The God that humanity creates is a "subhuman God," a distorted reflection of humanity's own alienated condition.

He argued that Christianity, particularly in its Protestant form, represented the "perfection of the religious consciousness" because it had universalized this alienation to encompass all aspects of life. In a famous passage, he described the alienated self of the Christian world as a "vampire of spiritual abstraction" that, having been drained of its own content, projects its powers onto a Messiah. For Bauer, this total alienation was a necessary step, a Vorbereitungsgeschichte (preparatory history), for total liberation. The critique of religion was therefore the necessary first step toward political revolution, as it aimed to dissolve the ideological foundations of the old order and restore to humanity its own creative powers.

=== Republicanism and the social question ===
Bauer's political thought was a form of republicanism that stood in opposition to both Restoration absolutism and possessive individualist liberalism. He envisioned a "republic of self-consciousness," a self-determining community founded on a genuine common interest rather than the aggregation of private, egoistic interests that characterized modern civil society. This republicanism required a radical transformation of individuals themselves, who must overcome their own particularity and elevate themselves to universality through ethical and political action. He held a Hegelian view of the state as the "manifestation of freedom" but critiqued the existing "Christian state" for being tied to the atomized, egoistic world of civil society. He drew inspiration from the French Revolution and the federal model of the United States.

He distinguished between the Volk (the people), a revolutionary subject capable of acting on universal principles, and the Masse (the masses), an atomized, inert aggregate of private individuals characteristic of modern market society. For Bauer, liberalism was the ideology of the Masse, as it defined freedom as the pursuit of private property and thereby dissolved the bonds of ethical life. After 1843, disappointed by the passivity of the masses in the face of political reaction, he turned to a theory of "pure critique," arguing that the intellectual elite must stand apart from the masses and their dogmatic ideologies. The task of the revolution was to create a true Volk by overcoming the egoism of mass society. This involved not only political change but also social emancipation, including the humanization of labor and the elimination of pauperism.

== Relationship with Karl Marx ==
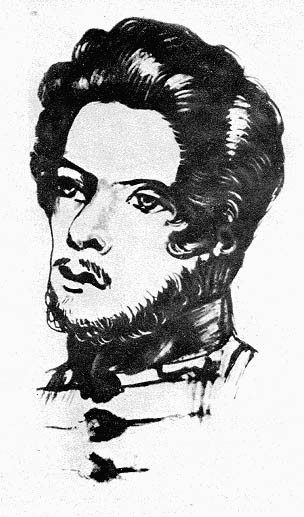
Depiction of the young Karl Marx

Bauer's relationship with Karl Marx was central to the development of both thinkers. Marx was Bauer's student at the University of Berlin, attending his lectures assiduously in 1839, and became a junior member of the Doktorklub which Bauer led. They developed a close friendship and intellectual collaboration; Bauer encouraged Marx to write his doctoral dissertation and planned to secure him a teaching position at Bonn. They planned several joint publishing ventures, including a journal of atheistic critique to be called the Archiv des Atheismus (Archive of Atheism). During this period, Marx was widely seen as Bauer's most dedicated disciple.

The intellectual affinity was deep. Marx's doctoral dissertation is saturated with Bauerian themes: the conception of the post-Aristotelian schools of philosophy as a struggle for the freedom of self-consciousness, the idea of critique as a form of world-changing praxis, and the apocalyptic view of history as a series of catastrophic transformations. The dissertation's preface declares, in a thoroughly Bauerian spirit, that philosophy opposes "all gods in heaven and earth that do not recognise human self-consciousness as the highest godhead." Marx's early views on religion, alienation, and ideology were profoundly shaped by Bauer. Marx's celebrated critique of religion in his 1843 introduction to his Critique of Hegel's Philosophy of Right borrows heavily from Bauer's language and imagery, including the ideas of religion as an "opium-like influence," the "imaginary flowers" on the chains of oppression, and the "illusory sun" around which man revolves before revolving around himself. More fundamentally, Marx adopted Bauer's critical method, applying the critique of religion as a model for the critique of politics and economics.

The friendship broke down in late 1842 over political and tactical differences, particularly concerning the radicalism of the Berlin Freien and the direction of the Rheinische Zeitung, which Marx was editing. Even then, Marx continued to praise Bauer's work, and the final break came later. The split culminated in a series of polemical works. In The Holy Family (1845) and The German Ideology (1846), Marx and Friedrich Engels launched a comprehensive critique of Bauer and his philosophy. They accused Bauer of being an abstract idealist who had turned "Critique" itself into a transcendent power, separate from the real struggles of the masses and material interests. Bauer responded by accusing Marx of dogmatism and a shallow understanding of his work. Despite the bitterness of the polemic, the two men re-established personal contact in London in the mid-1850s and discussed politics and philosophy.

== Legacy ==
Bruno Bauer was a pivotal, if controversial, figure in 19th-century German thought. His scholarly reputation was largely destroyed by Marx's polemics, which depicted him as a speculative idealist completely detached from reality. This caricature influenced generations of scholars, including Georg Lukács and Ernst Bloch, who tended to dismiss Bauer as a minor figure who "lived off the crumbs of Hegelian philosophy". As a leading Young Hegelian, he played a crucial role in the development of radical biblical criticism. His argument that Jesus was a literary myth rather than a historical figure was famously praised by Albert Schweitzer as "the ablest and most complete collection of the difficulties of the life of Jesus which is anywhere to be found." Fellow Hegelian Karl Rosenkranz described him as "undoubtedly the most important" of the Berlin Freien "in character as in culture and talent."

After 1848, Bauer's influence waned in progressive circles, but his later work anticipated themes that would be taken up by others. His prediction of an age of global imperialism and his critique of modern mass society as a form of cultural decay were influential on Friedrich Nietzsche. His late, virulent anti-Semitism, in which he recast the "Jewish question" as the central social problem of a declining Europe, contributed to the intellectual arsenal of modern anti-Semitism. Despite this, his earlier work on the Roman origins of Christianity was later praised and developed by socialists like Karl Kautsky and Engels, who, in his later years, acknowledged Bauer's great contribution to solving the "Evangelical mystery" and paved the way for a selective use of his atheistic ideas in anti-religious propaganda, notably in the Soviet Union.

== Major works ==
- De pulchri principiis, Prussian royal prize manuscript, first published as Prinzipien des Schönen. De pulchri principiis. Eine Preisschrift (1829), new ed. Douglas Moggach und Winfried Schultze (Berlin: Akademie Verlag, 1996).
- "Rezension (review): Das Leben Jesu, David Friedrich Strauss," Jahrbücher für wissenschaftliche Kritik, Dec. 1835; May 1836.
- Kritik der Geschichte der Offenbarung. Die Religion des alten Testaments in der geschichtlichen Entwicklung ihrer Prinzipien dargestellt 2 vol. (Berlin, 1838).
- Herr Dr. Hengstenberg (Berlin, 1839).
- Kritik der evangelischen Geschichte des Johannes (Bremen, 1840)
- "Der christliche Staat und unsere Zeit," Hallische Jahrbücher für deutsche Wissenschaft und Kunst, June 1841.
- Kritik der evangelischen Geschichte der Synoptiker, 2 vols. (Leipzig, 1841)
- Die Posaune des jüngsten Gerichts über Hegel, den Atheisten und Antichristen (Leipzig, 1841); trans. L. Stepelevich, The Trumpet of the Last Judgement against Hegel the Atheist and Antichrist. An Ultimatum (Lewiston, N.Y.: E. Mellen Press, 1989)
- (anon.) Hegels Lehre von der Religion und Kunst von dem Standpuncte des Glaubens aus beurteilt (Leipzig, 1842); new ed. Aalen (Scientia Verlag, 1967)
- Die gute Sache der Freiheit und meine eigene Angelegenheit (1842)
- Die Judenfrage (1843) ("The Jewish Question")
- Das Entdeckte Christentum (Zürich, 1843, banned and destroyed, into oblivion until 1927: ed. Barnikol); transl. Esther Ziegler, Christianity Exposed (MellenPress, 2002)
- "Die Fähigkeit der heutigen Juden und Christen, frei zu werden," in Georg Herwegh (ed.), Einundzwanzig Bogen aus der Schweiz (Zürich und Winterthur, 1843)
- Geschichte der Politik, Kultur und Aufklärung des 18. Jahrhunderts, 4 vol. (1843–45)
- "Die Gattung und die Masse", Allg. Lit.-Ztg. X, September 1844
- Geschichte Deutschlands und der französischen Revolution unter der Herrschaft Napoleons, 2 vols. (1846)
- Der Ursprung des Galaterbriefs (Hempel, 1850)
- Kritik der paulinischen Briefe ("Critique of Paul's epistles") (Berlin, 1850-1851)
- Der Ursprung des ersten Korintherbriefes (Hempel, 1851)
- Kritik der Evangelien und Geschichte ihres Ursprungs, 3 vols. (1850–51); 4th vol. Die theologische Erklärung der Evangelien (Berlin, 1852).
- Russland und das Germanentum 2 vol. (1853)
- Das Judenthum in der Fremde. (Berlin, 1863).
- Philo, Renan und das Urchristentum (Berlin, 1874)
- Einfluss des englischen Quäkerthums auf die deutsche Cultur und auf das englisch-russische Project einer Weltkirche (Berlin, 1878)
- Christus und die Cäsaren...Transl. German to English by Helmut Brunar and Byron Marchant, Christ and the Caesars... available (Bloomington IN: Xlibris Publishing, 2015).
- Disraelis romantischer und Bismarcks sozialistischer Imperialismus (1882)

=== Translations ===
The great bulk of Bauer's writings have still not been translated into English. Only a few works by Bauer have been formally translated:

- The Trumpet of the Last Judgment Against Hegel the Atheist and Antichrist (1841, trans. Lawrence Stepelevich, 1989).
- The Jewish Problem (1843, trans. Helen Lederer, Hebrew Union College Union-Jewish Institute of Religion, 1958).
- Christianity Exposed: A Recollection of the 18th Century and a Contribution to the Crisis of the 19th Century (tr. Esther Ziegler and Jutta Hamm, ed. Paul Trejo, 2002).
- Philo, Strauss und Renan und das Urchristentum (Berlin, 1874) (2026) readable machine translation by Neil Godfrey, modern verse citations of Philo's works added.
- Bauer's Christ and the Caesars: The Origin of Christianity from the Mythology of Rome and Greece (1879) was ably translated into English by scholars Helmut Brunar and Byron Marchant (2015, Xlibris Publishing).
