= Douglas Moggach =

Canadian philosopher

Education
- Education: BA Toronto, MA and PhD Princeton

Douglas Moggach is a professor at the University of Ottawa and Honorary Fellow of St. Catharine's College, Cambridge. He was elected Fellow of the Royal Society of Canada in 2025. He is Honorary Professor of Philosophy at the University of Sydney, and has held visiting appointments at Sidney Sussex College and King's College, Cambridge, the Centre for History and Economics, Cambridge, Queen Mary University of London, the Scuola Normale Superiore di Pisa., and the Fondazione San Carlo di Modena, where he taught a graduate seminar in Italian on German Idealism. He lectured on Marx and German Idealism as Visiting Professor at Beijing Normal University in 2013 and 2015. Moggach has also held the University Research Chair in Political Thought at the University of Ottawa. In 2007, he won the Killam Research Fellowship awarded by the Canada Council for the Arts. He was named Distinguished University Professor at University of Ottawa in 2011.

== Works ==
Moggach has written on Gottfried Wilhelm Leibniz, Immanuel Kant, Johann Gottlieb Fichte, Georg Wilhelm Friedrich Hegel, Friedrich Schiller, Bruno Bauer, aesthetics, Republicanism, and history of ancient and modern political thought.

Moggach's research falls into three principal areas: analysis of the philosophy, politics, and economic thought of the Hegelian School; the historical development of German idealism from Leibniz to Hegel; and aesthetics and politics. His archival research led to the discovery and publication of lost texts by Bruno Bauer, a leading figure in the Hegelian School of the 1830s and 1840s. Moggach argues that the political thinking of the German Hegelians represents a specific variant of republicanism, which recognizes modern social diversity and alienation. His works in German Idealism have focused on the foundational importance of Leibniz for Kant and Hegel, and trace the origins of Kant's juridical thought in the German Enlightenment debates about freedom, perfection, and state economic direction. Moggach has also published on aesthetics and politics, notably on Schiller and Bauer, developing the concept of an aesthetic republicanism based on an aesthetic version of Kant's moral idea of autonomy. Moggach also traces the relations between German idealism and various strands of Romanticism, and contributes to conceptions of universality, freedom and republicanism in European political thought. Moggach wrote the chapter on Karl Marx in The Impact of Idealism, ed. N. Boyle and J. Walker, vol. 2 (CUP 2013) and the chapter on "Romantic Political Thought" in Oxford Companion to European Romanticism, ed. P. Hamilton (OUP, 2016). He also wrote the chapter "Aesthetics and Politics" in the Cambridge History of Nineteenth Century Political Thought and the entry "Bruno Bauer" in the Stanford Encyclopedia of Philosophy .

Moggach discovered an unpublished manuscript by Bruno Bauer, which had been awarded the Prussian Royal Prize in philosophy by a panel headed by Hegel in 1829. This manuscript, written in Latin, is held in the archives of the Humboldt Universität, Berlin, but had not been recognized before. Moggach shows how after attending Hegel's lectures on logic in 1828, Bauer applies this logic to the categories of aesthetic judgement that Kant had developed in his Third Critique. Starting from the Hegelian premise of the unity of thought and being, Bauer wants to show that the separation of subject and object in Kant's Critiques of Pure and of Practical Reason remains a feature of the Critique of Judgement. Bauer argues that Kant does make efforts to bridge the gap, and he opens the path that Hegel will follow, but Kant does not finally succeed in this objective. What prevents him from succeeding is his faulty treatment of the categories involved in making aesthetic judgements. Moggach thinks that in this early text Bauer also lays the foundations for his later theory of infinite self-consciousness, and for his specific type of ethical and historical idealism. An Italian edition, Sui Principi del Bello, with additional interpretive materials, was released by University of Palermo in 2019.

Moggach's book The Philosophy and Politics of Bruno Bauer (CUP, 2003) is the first major study in English of Bruno Bauer (1809–82), a student of Hegel and a leader of the Hegelian School in Prussia. The book establishes Bauer as a representative of German republicanism, and traces the emergence of this movement from philosophical and religious polemics of the 1830s and 1840s, its relation to Kant and Hegel, and its assessment of political and economic change, especially the French Revolution and its impact on German states. This work was short-listed for the 2004 C. B. Macpherson Prize, awarded by the Canadian Political Science Association. It was reviewed by Frederick Beiser in The Times Literary Supplement, 24 September 2004; Choice, November 2004; and other journals. A German translation was published in 2009. A Chinese translation appeared in 2022.

Moggach's edited volume, The New Hegelians (CUP, 2006), is intended to show that after Hegel's death in 1831, members of his school developed his philosophy in new directions in order to understand the evolution of modern society, along with the modern state and economy. The Hegelians were not mere imitators of their teacher, but creative thinkers about modernity and its problems, especially social cohesion and the conflict of individual interests. According to Moggach, many of these New or Young Hegelians found a solution to these conflicts in republican ideas of virtue, rethought so that they are compatible with modern institutions. Moggach applies the idea of republican rigorism, introduced by other historians of political thought, to outline these solutions. For the Hegelians, this concept involves changing the boundaries between morality and legality that Kant had established. Kant had claimed that the legal sphere concerns the external aspects of action alone, but not its motivating principles or maxims. For the Hegelians, though, political action has to promote, or at least not hinder, the external freedom of others, but it must also have the right kinds of internal ethical motivation: this means not acting exclusively from private interest, but from an idea of the general good. In this way Kant's idea of autonomy is related to political as well as moral action, and to republican ideas of freedom as non domination.

In a subsequent edited volume, Politics, Religion, and Art: Hegelian Debates (Northwestern UP, 2011), Moggach and his colleagues continue to establish the importance of the Hegelians of the 1830s and 1840s as innovators in theology, aesthetics, and ethics, and as creative contributors to foundational debates about modernity, state, and society. The political significance of religious and aesthetic debates, and the German contributions to republican political thought, receive further attention in this volume, which also draws heavily on archival material.

With Gareth Stedman Jones, Moggach edited a Cambridge University Press volume, The 1848 Revolutions and European Political Thought, 2018. The book examines political debate in France, England, Netherlands, the German and Italian territories, and Eastern Europe before and after the revolutions. Subjects treated include democracy and representation, state and economy, nationalism and religion. Even if the revolutions failed to win their immediate goals, they set the agenda for later developments.

In the bilingual (German and English) volume Perfektionismus der Autonomie (2020), edited by Moggach with Nadine Mooren and Michael Quante, the contributors study major figures in a tradition identified in Moggach's previous work as post-Kantian perfectionism, a type of perfectionist ethics that can withstand Kant's criticism of earlier forms. The objective is to promote the material, institutional and legal conditions for free action, and not any predefined idea of the good life or happiness. Progressive reform of political and economic institutions to make them conform to the evolving demands of reason is now the aim. The book deals with Johann Gottfried Herder, Wilhelm von Humboldt, Fichte, Schiller, Hegel, and members of the Hegelian school including Karl Marx. Other chapters examine Nietzsche, neo-Kantianism, and T.W. Adorno. The book concludes with systematic reflections and outlines of future research. Moggach takes up the theme of post-Kantian perfectionism again in his 2025 Cambridge University Press volume, Freedom and Perfection. German Political Thought from Leibniz to Marx.

Moggach, Beiser, and other interlocutors debated Schiller's republicanism in a special issue of Inquiry (2008). Moggach produced a critical discussion of multiculturalism, in a published conversation with Charles Taylor, Jeremy Waldron, James Tully, and others. Moggach contributed the entry "Hegelian School" to the Encyclopædia Britannica.

== Publications ==
Selected Books

- Moggach, D., Freedom and Perfection. German Political Thought from Leibniz to Marx, Cambridge University Press, 2025
- Moggach, D., Mooren, N., and Quante, M., eds., Perfektionismus der Autonomie, Fink Verlag, 2020, 412 pp.
- Moggach, D., and Schimmenti, Gabriele, eds., Bruno Bauer. Sui Principi del Bello, Palermo University Press, 2019, 162 pp.
- Moggach, D., and Stedman Jones, G, eds., The 1848 Revolutions and European Political Thought, Cambridge University Press, 2018, 488 pp.
- Hudson, W., Moggach, D., Stamm, M., Rethinking German Idealism, Noesis Press, 2016, 110 pp.
- Moggach, D., Politics, Religion, and Art: Hegelian Debates, Northwestern University Press, 2011, 435 pp.
- Moggach, D., Hegelianismo, Republicanismo e Modernidade, Brazil, PUCRS (Catholic University, Rio Grande do Sul), 2010, 80 pp.
- Moggach, D. (Ed.), The New Hegelians: Politics and Philosophy in the Hegelian School, Cambridge, Cambridge University Press, 2006, 345 pp.
- Moggach, D., The Philosophy and Politics of Bruno Bauer, Cambridge, Cambridge University Press, 2003, 302 pp; CUP paperback edition, 2007. German translation: Philosophie und Politik bei Bruno Bauer, Frankfurt am Main, Lang, 2009, Studien zum Junghegelianismus, 285 pp. Chinese translation Beijing Normal University Press, 2022 ISBN：9787303280605
- Buhr, M., and D. Moggach (Eds.), Reason, Universality, and History, Ottawa, Legas Press, 2004, 303 pp.
- Moggach, D., and P.L. Browne (Eds.), The Social Question and the Democratic Revolution: Aspects of 1848, Ottawa/Toronto, Univ. of Ottawa Press, 2000.
- Moggach, D., Bruno Bauer: Über die Prinzipien des Schönen. De pulchri principiis. Eine Preisschrift, Berlin, Akademie Verlag, 1996.
