= Georg Lasson =

German Protestant theologian

Georg Lasson (13 July 1862 – 2 December 1932) was a German Protestant theologian, and a son of Adolf Lasson. He was a co-editor of Georg Wilhelm Friedrich Hegel's Sämtliche Werke in the Meiner edition (see Hegel bibliography). Although the result is not always praised today, his edition is useful to researches as he had access to manuscripts that have since been lost.

== Biography ==
Georg Lasson was born in Berlin in 1862. Lasson studied philosophy and theology at the Berlin University and the University of Tübingen. In 1885 he became a curate in Potsdam, and three years later, a pastor in Friedersdorf (near Storkow). He was pastor at the Bartholomäuskirche in Berlin from 1902 to 1927. In 1921 he received a PhD from the University of Kiel.

He published his theological research in Theorie des christilichen Dogmas (1897) and Grundfragen der Glaubenslehre (1913). After 1900 he went to philosophy. Influenced by his father Adolf Lasson, he worked on Hegel and German Idealism that he interpreted through Greek thought (Plato and Aristotle). In Hegel's dialectic he saw the possibility for a synthesis between philosophy and theology. He described the dialectic as the "identity of identity and non-identity" (Was heisst Hegelianismus?, 1916). He published a critical edition of Hegel's works and edited a series called Hegel Archiv (1912), after the Kant Studien. He died in Berlin.

== Literary works ==
- Hegels sämtlicher Werke", (co-editor) 18 Volumes, 1905–1944. Leipzig: Meiner. OCLC 12646090 – Hegel's collected works.
- Gottessohn im Fleisch, 1892 – Son of God in the flesh.
- Zur Theorie des christlichen Dogmas, 1897 – On the theory of Christian dogma.
- Beiträge zur Hegelforschung, 2 Vols., 1909 – Contributions to Hegel research.
- Grundfragen des Glaubens, 1913 – Basic questions of doctrine.
- Hegel als Geschichtsphilosoph, 1920 – Hegel as a philosopher of history.
