= Walter Cerf =

German professor of philosophy

Walter Heymann Cerf
- Born: May 14, 1907; Leipzig, Germany
- Died: October 26, 2001 (aged 94); Leicester, Vermont

Academic background
- Education: Princeton University (PhD)
- Thesis: Spirit and World: Prolegomena to a Philosophy of Art (1941)
- Doctoral advisor: Theodore Meyer Greene
- Other advisor: David Frederick Bowers

Academic work
- Era: Contemporary philosophy
- Region: Western philosophy
- School or tradition: German Idealism
- Institutions: University of Palermo; Princeton University; University of Minnesota; Brooklyn College

Walter Heymann Cerf (May 14, 1907 Leipzig, Germany – October 26, 2001 Leicester, Vermont) was a professor of philosophy, better known by Vermonters as a philanthropist of arts, education, historic preservation and social services.

== Life and works ==
=== Academic career ===
Cerf was born as Hans Walter Heymann in May 14, 1907 to Hermann and Herta (Cerf) Heymann. His father was a successful businessman who founded the Gesellschaft für Eigentumsschutz which by the 1930s became the biggest night security agency in Europe. He spent most of his youth in Berlin, after his family moved there in 1912. Before being awarded his PhD in 1933 from the University of Bonn, he studied at University of Freiburg, University of Heidelberg and University of Austria.

From 1933 to 1936, he taught at the University of Palermo in Sicily before moving to the United States due to being Jewish and facing persecution in Nazi Germany and Fascist Italy. Although fluent in three languages, he only knew basic English when he arrived and applied for a job as a houseman for two Princeton undergraduates learning German. They encouraged him to learn English, which led him to study at Princeton, where he earned a second Ph.D. in philosophy in 1941.

He became a naturalized U.S. citizen in 1943 after adopting his mother’s maiden name and enlisted in the army the same year, serving in military intelligence with the 35th Infantry Division. He was awarded the Bronze Star for his service.

After the war, he had a 26-year career as a philosophy professor, teaching at Princeton, the University of Minnesota, and Brooklyn College (from 1947 to 1971). A scholar of Immanuel Kant, he published significant works including Existential Interpretation of Sensibility (1933) and Kant's Analytic of the Beautiful (1963), as well as many articles. His English translations of Hegel’s works remain highly regarded.

=== Philanthropy ===
After retiring to Vermont in 1971, Walter Cerf began a notable philanthropic career. Although the Nazis had seized his father's business in 1938, half was returned to the family after World War II, and he sold his share in 1987. He went on to make significant donations, including funding the business school at Champlain College (which bears his name), the Shelburne Museum, and the Vermont Arts Endowment. In recognition of his contributions, the Vermont Arts Council created the Walter Cerf Award for Lifetime Achievement in the Arts in 1995. He also endowed a professorship at Middlebury College in 1996 and, on his 90th birthday in 1997, gave $2 million to establish the Walter Cerf Community Fund. Over 15 years, he donated more than $12.5 million to over 120 Vermont organizations.

=== Selected publications ===
==== Translations ====
- The Difference Between Fichte's and Schelling's System of Philosophy: An English Translation of G. W. F. Hegel's Differenz des Fichte'schen und Schelling'schen Systems der Philosophie. State University of New York Press. 4 March 1988. ISBN 978-1-4384-0629-9.
- Faith and Knowledge. State University of New York Press. 1977. ISBN 978-0-87395-338-2.

==== Monographs ====
- Kenna, Constance; Bates, Stanley; Saunders, Richard H. (2007). Walter Cerf : A personal odyssey. Middlebury College Museum of Art. ISBN 978-1-928825-05-0.
