= Adolf Lasson =

German Jewish philosophical writer

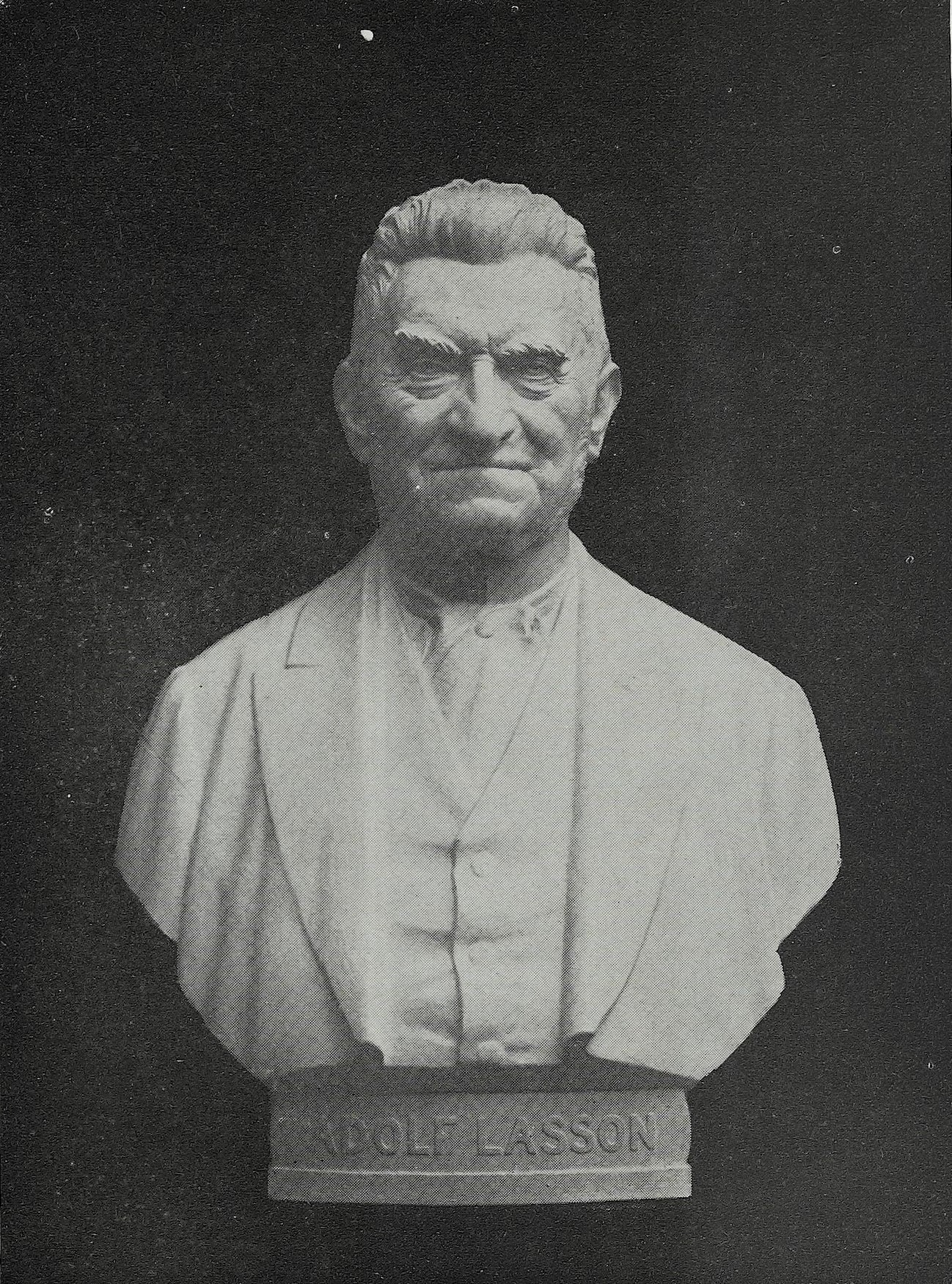
Adolf Lasson. Bust sculpted by Fritz Heinemann

Adolf Lasson (12 March 1832, Alt-Strelitz, today Neustrelitz, Mecklenburg-Strelitz – 20 December 1917, Berlin) was a German Jewish philosophical writer, strident Prussianist, and the father of Georg Lasson.

== Biography ==
Born into a Jewish family, converted to Christianity, changing name from 'Lazarussohn.' He was educated at the Gymnasium Carolinum, Neu-Strelitz, and the University of Berlin (1848–52; philosophy with Friedrich Eduard Beneke, classical philology with A. Boeckh, Lachmann and Trendelenburg, theology and law). In 1858 he became teacher at the Friedrichsgymnasium, and from 1859 to 1897 he occupied the same position at the Louisenstädtisches Real-Gymnasium. In 1861 he took the Ph.D. degree at Leipzig University, and in 1877 became privatdozent in philosophy at Berlin University. Since 1874 he lectured on the history of German literature at the Viktoria Lyceum. He embraced Christianity in 1853, and as of 1906 held the position of honorary professor at the University of Berlin. By the time he converted to Christianity he changed his family name from the original Lazarussohn to Lasson.

== Ideas ==
Adolf Lasson was influenced by German Idealism and by the writings of the Hegelian theologian David Friedrich Strauss. He saw the liberty of mind as the first and most certain fact and as a moral duty. The ideas of Meister Eckhart were for him principles for both Christianity and German Idealism.

== Literary works ==
- "Johann Gottlieb Fichte im Verhältnis zu Kirche und Staat", 1863;
- "Meister Eckhart" and "Das Kulturideal und der Krieg", 1868;
- "Prinzip und Zukunft des Völkerrechts", 1871;
- "System der Rechtsphilosophie", 1881;
- "Die Entwickelung des religiösen Bewusstseins der Menschheit nach E. v. Hartmann", 1883;
- "Zeitliches und Zeitloses", 8 lectures, 1890;
- "Das unendlich Kleine im wirthschaftlichen Leben", 1891
- "Lotterie und Volkswirtschaft", 1894;
- "Das Gedächtnis", 1894;
- "Handelsinteressen und Grundbesitzinteressen", 1896;
- "Der Leib", 1898

He also edited a translation into German of Giordano Bruno's "De Causa" (3d ed. 1902), and a small volume of religious poetry entitled "Herzensstille", 1868.
