= Christoph Wulf =

German anthropologist

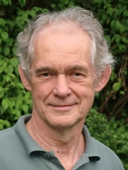
- Christoph Wulf

Academic background
- Education: Free University of Berlin, University of Marburg

Academic work
- Discipline: Anthropology, Education Sciences
- Website: christophwulf.de

Christoph Wulf (born 4 August 1944, in Berlin, Germany) is a German professor of Anthropology and Education at the Free University of Berlin.

== Education and career ==
Wulf completed his studies of history, education sciences, philosophy, and literature studies at the Free University of Berlin in 1968. The next year, he commenced his studies for a PhD at the University of Marburg on a grant from the Volkswagen Foundation. Following educational travels throughout the US at the invitation of the US Department of Education, he completed research stays at the universities of Stanford, Los Angeles, Boulder and New York. Between 1970 and 1975, Wulf was a researcher at the German Institute for International Research in Education in Frankfurt. In 1973, he obtained his PhD, and in 1975 his habilitation from Marburg and was appointed Professor of Education at the University of Siegen. Wulf has held the position of Professor of Anthropology and Education at the Free University of Berlin since 1980. His other roles include: member of the Interdisciplinary Center for Historical Anthropology at the Free University of Berlin, past member of the post-graduate program "Körper-Inszenierungen" ("Stagings of the Body") (1997-2006), of the Collaborative Research Centre "Cultures of the Performative" (1999-2010), of the Cluster of Excellence "Languages of Emotion" (2007-2014; Principal Investigator) and of the post-graduate program "InterArts Studies" (2006-2015) at the same university. Since 1988 he has been a member and since 2008 a Vice President of the German Commission of UNESCO. His books have been translated into 20 languages.

In 1972 Wulf founded the Peace Education Commission of the International Peace Research Association, whose first secretary he served as, and he co-founded the commission on Pedagogical Anthropology of the German Educational Research Association. He was a member of the board of directors of the German Association for Peace and Conflict Research, the International Peace Research Association (Oslo), the Groupe d’Études et de Recherches sur les Mondialisations (Paris), the German Academic Exchange Service (Bonn), and the scientific advisory group for the Comprehensive School Experiment in North Rhine-Westphalia (Düsseldorf). He has served as the president of the Network Educational Science Amsterdam and on the scientific advisory boards of the Institut National de Recherche Pédagogique (Paris/Lyon) and the International Research Center for Cultural Studies (Vienna). The University of Bucharest awarded him the title "professor honoris causa" for his anthropological research.

Research stays and invited professorships have included the following locations: Stanford, Tokyo, Kyoto, Beijing, Shanghai, Mysore, Delhi, Paris, Lille, Strasbourg, Modena, Amsterdam, Stockholm, Copenhagen, London, Vienna, Rome, Lisbon, Moscow, Saint Petersburg, Kazan; São Paulo.

In 1992, he founded and has since been the editor-in-chief of the international journal of historical anthropology "Paragrana"; he is also a co-editor of the "Zeitschrift für Erziehungswissenschaft" ("Journal of Educational Science") and a member of the scientific advisory board of numerous national and international journals and book series.

== Selected publications ==
=== Monographs ===
- Human beings and their images. London, 2021.
- Bildung als Wissen vom Menschen im Anthropozän. Weinheim, 2020.
- Homo Imaginationis. Le radici estetiche dell'antropologia storico-culturale. Milano-Udine, 2018.
- Anthropology. A Continental Perspective. Chicago, 2013.
- Das Rätsel des Humanen. Eine Einführung in die Historische Anthropologie. Paderborn, 2013.
- Une anthropologie historique et culturelle: Rituels, mimesis sociale et performativité. Paris, 2007.
- Anthropologie kultureller Vielfalt. Interkulturelle Bildung in Zeiten der Globalisierung. Bielefeld, 2006.
- Science of Education. Hermeneutics, Empirical Research, and Critical Theory. Münster, 2002.
- Anthropologie der Erziehung. Eine Einführung. Weinheim, 2001
- Spiel, Ritual, Geste. Mimetisches Handeln in der sozialen Welt. Reinbek, 1998 (with G. Gebauer).
- Mimesis. Culture–Art–Society. Berkeley, 1995 (with G. Gebauer).
- Das politisch-sozialwissenschaftliche Curriculum. Munich, 1973.

=== Project reports ===
- with G. Kress, S. Selander, R. Saljö (eds.). Learning as Social Practice. Beyond Education as an Individual Enterprise. London, 2021.
- with G. Brougère, L. Colin, C. Délory-Momberger, I. Kellermann, K. Lichau. A la rencontre de l’autre. Lieux, corps, sens dans les échanges scolaires. Paris, 2018.
- with Gabriele Brandstetter, Michael B. Buchholz., Andreas Hamburger. Balance – Rhythmus – Resonanz. Paragrana 27 (2018) 1.
- with S. Suzuki et al. Das Glück der Familie. Ethnographische Studien in Deutschland und Japan. Wiesbaden, 2011.
- et al. Die Geste in Erziehung, Bildung und Sozialisation. Ethnographische Feldstudien. Wiesbaden, 2011.
- et al. Ritual and Identity. The Staging and Performing of Rituals in the Lives of Young People. London, 2010.
- et al. Geburt in Familie, Klinik und Medien. Eine qualitative Untersuchung. Opladen, 2008.
- et al. Lernkulturen im Umbruch. Rituelle Praktiken in Schule, Medien, Familie und Jugend. Wiesbaden, 2007.
- et al. Bildung im Ritual: Schule, Familie, Jugend, Medien. Wiesbaden, 2004.
- et al. Grundlagen des Performativen. Eine Einführung in die Zusammenhänge von Sprache, Macht und Handeln. Munich, 2001.

=== Edited books ===
- Handbook of the Anthropocene. Humans between Heritage and Future. Berlin, 2023 (with N. Wallenhorst).
- The Palgrave Handbook of Embodiment and Learning. London, 2022 (with A. Kraus).
- Science and Scientification. London, 2020 (with A. Michaels).
- Repetition, Recurrence, Returns. How Cultural Renewal Works. Lanham, 2019 (with. J. R. Resina).
- Global Youth in Digital Trajectories. London, 2017 (second edition, with M. Kontopodis, C. Varvantakis).
- Exploring Alterity in the Globalized World. London, 2016.
- Hazardous Future. Disaster, Representation, and the Assessment of Risk. Berlin, 2015 (with I. Capeloa Gil).
- Handbuch Pädagogische Anthropologie. Wiesbaden, 2014 (with J. Zirfas).
- Exploring the Senses. London, 2013 (with A. Michaels).
- Emotions in Rituals and Performances. London, 2012 (with A. Michaels).
- Children, Development and Education. Cultural, Historical, Anthropological Perspectives. Dordrecht, 2011 (with M. Kontopodis and B. Fichtner).
- Der Mensch und seine Kultur. Hundert Beiträge zur Geschichte, Gegenwart und Zukunft des menschlichen Lebens. Cologne, 2010.
- Dynamics and Performativity of Imagination. The Image between the Visible and the Invisible. New York, 2009 (with B. Huppauf).
