= Institut national de recherche pédagogique =

French research institute

Coordinates: 45°43′57″N 4°49′55″E

Institut national de recherche pédagogique (INRP) (English: National Institute for Educational Research) was the national French research institute for the field of education. It was dissolved in 2010.

== History ==
The French Institute of Education (Institut français de l'éducation, IFÉ) traces its origins to the Pedagogical Museum created in 1878. In the following decades, a library, a phonographic archive and a central film archive of the Ministry of National Education (France) were also established, together with a publications service.

In 1954, a public institution was created by law, bringing together the Pedagogical Museum and these various services. By decree n°55-109 of 19 it was named the National Centre for Educational Documentation (Centre national de documentation pédagogique, CNDP), and in 1956 it was renamed the National Pedagogical Institute (Institut pédagogique national, IPN).

In 1970, two decrees of 9 transformed the IPN into two new organizations: the French Office for Modern Educational Techniques (Office français des techniques modernes d'éducation, OFRATEME) and the National Institute for Research and Educational Documentation (Institut national de recherche et de documentation pédagogique, INRDP). In 1976 (decrees of 3), OFRATEME resumed the name CNDP, while INRDP became the National Institute for Educational Research (Institut national de recherche pédagogique, INRP). The latter developed a dual mission: to host pedagogical research and to provide educational documentation resources.

The INRP’s organization evolved: in 1980 a scientific council was set up to oversee the Institute’s research teams; in 1991 the INRP library became a centre for acquisition and dissemination of scientific and technical information (CADIST) in education sciences. Its status was modified by the decree of 5, which updated the Institute’s definition: to carry out research with partners, to play an observatory role, and to consolidate educational research. The Institute came under the joint supervision of the Ministry of National Education and the Ministry of Higher Education and Research (France). In 2002–2003, the INRP signed its first four-year contract with the Ministry of National Education, joining the regular contractual framework of higher education and research institutions.

Based for many years in Paris on rue d’Ulm, the INRP relocated in February to Lyon, in the Gerland district, on the campus of the École normale supérieure Lettres et sciences humaines. This relocation provoked major protests from staff. Only three research teams remained in the Paris region: the History of Education Department in the former rue d’Ulm premises, La main à la pâte in Montrouge, and the STEF team in Cachan at the École normale supérieure de Cachan. The INRP also included units in Rouen (the National Museum of Education) and in Marseille.

In 2007, it became an associate member of the University of Lyon, within the newly created research and higher education cluster (PRES) of Lyon.

The INRP was dissolved by decree on 28 and its activities transferred to the École normale supérieure de Lyon, except for the National Museum of Education, which was reintegrated into the CNDP. The INRP’s activities and most of its staff were regrouped within an internal institute of ENS Lyon, created on 18 under the name French Institute of Education (Institut français de l’éducation, IFÉ). On that date, the ENS Lyon board approved the IFÉ’s statutes, budget, and administrative structure.

Since 16, the French Institute of Education has been directed by Michel Lussault, who also chaired the Conseil supérieur des programmes between 25 and 26 September 2017.

== Status ==
The Institute is a component of the École normale supérieure de Lyon, but it has its own governing bodies (director, governance council, and strategic and scientific advisory board). It succeeded the National Institute for Educational Research, taking over all its missions and obligations except the museum function.

Within ENS Lyon, the French Institute of Education is a national and international centre for research, training, and knowledge mediation in education, based on continuous interaction with educational communities, thanks in part to the recruitment of seconded and associate professors.
