= Feuerbach (surname) =

Feuerbach is a surname. Notable people with the surname include:

- Paul Johann Anselm Ritter von Feuerbach (1775–1833), German legal scholar
- Joseph Anselm Feuerbach (1798–1851), German philologist and archaeologist
- Karl Wilhelm Feuerbach (1800–1834), German mathematician
- Kylie Feuerbach (born 2001), American basketball player
- Ludwig Feuerbach (1804–1872), German philosopher and anthropologist
- Friedrich Feuerbach (1806–1880), German philologist and philosopher
- Henriette Feuerbach (1812–1892), German writer, wife of Joseph Anselm, and patron of the art of her stepson Anselm
- Anselm Feuerbach (1829–1880), German classicist painter
- Lawrence Feuerbach (1879–1911), American shot-put Olympian
- Al Feuerbach (born 1948), American shot putter

== See also ==
- Feuerbach (disambiguation)
