= Feuerbach (disambiguation) =

Feuerbach may also refer to:

== People ==
- Ludwig Feuerbach (1804–1872), German philosopher and anthropologist
- Paul Johann Anselm Ritter von Feuerbach, German legal scholar
- Anselm Feuerbach, German classicist painter
- Feuerbach (surname)

== Places ==
- Feuerbach (Kandern), a location of the Battle of Schliengen (1796)
- Feuerbach (Neckar), a river of Germany
- Stuttgart-Feuerbach, a district of the city of Stuttgart
