= Hainichen =

Hainichen may refer to:

- Hainichen, Saxony
- Hainichen, Thuringia
