= Friedrich Feuerbach =

German philosopher (1806–1880)

Friedrich Feuerbach.

Friedrich Heinrich Feuerbach (29 September 1806 – 24 January 1880) was a German philologist and philosopher. In the 1840s, he played an important role disseminating materialist and atheist philosophy.

== Life ==
Friedrich Feuerbach was born on 29 September 1806 in Munich. He was the youngest son of the distinguished jurist Paul Johann Anselm Ritter von Feuerbach (1775–1833) and uncle of painter Anselm Feuerbach (1829–1880). His older brothers were all distinguished scholars.

In 1826, he began his studies at the university of Erlangen. At first he studied theology, then history, and finally philology and philosophy, specializing in Sanskrit literature. His supervisor was Friedrich Rückert. At Erlangen, he was a member of a liberal nationalist student fraternity. In 1831, shortly after graduating, he went to Paris to work with the noted philologists and linguists Chézy, Bournouf and Remusat. France had recently experienced the July Revolution, and Friedrich met with some of the French utopian socialists of the time (e.g., Pierre Leroux). He also seems to have travelled to Switzerland, where he met the radical followers of Wilhelm Weitling; some of them subsequently studied his writings on religion. There is no evidence, however, that Friedrich Feuerbach himself ever participated in any revolutionary association (nor would this have been in character with his diffident nature).

On his return to Germany, Feuerbach did not seek a profession but instead took rented rooms in Nuremberg and lived on a small state pension. He lived that way for most of his life. Friedrich Feuerbach published several translations from Sanskrit, Spanish, Italian and French. In the 1830s, he was associated with the Young German movement in literature; in the early 1840s, he contributed to a number of Young Hegelian magazines. Freuerbach is described as extremely shy and withdrawn. His brother Ludwig described him as utterly undemanding. The suicide attempt of his older brother Karl, the mathematician, who had been arrested for belonging to a liberal student fraternity in 1824, greatly affected Friedrich. He was with Karl during his battle with mental illness and when he died prematurely in 1834. The physician Dr. Theodor Spoerri, a family friend, thought he suffered from "heaviness of the blood" (depression). He also thought that the "genius" of the talented Feuerbach family was most concentrated in Friedrich, the least-known brother. The philosopher Georg Friedrich Daumer was one of his few occasional visitors. The liberal theologian Johann Heinrich Wichern also acknowledged his influence.

Feuerbach was a qualified Orientalist with several publications. However, under the influence of his brother Ludwig, he turned to philosophy. He expounded a critique of religion that was heavily indebted to his brother's. He professed "to preach what he taught." Friedrich often actively assisted Ludwig in editing his manuscripts. In spite of his atheism, Friedrich seems to have sympathized with a local liberal Protestant 'free faith' group. He died in Nuremberg on 24 January 1880.

== Views ==
Friedrich Feuerbach shared his brother Ludwig's materialistic humanism. However, he focused less on his brother's theories of the origin of religious alienation and more on the practical implications of religion. Religion requires of the believer "a perpetual sacrifice of his autonomous thinking." The desire for happiness is the most powerful human drive, but it can be fulfilled only if (a) human beings know their essential nature (Wesen) and (b) they love it. Christianity interferes with the first by replacing science with superstition; it hinders the second by portraying human beings as hopelessly weak and dependent on the will of an almighty God. It is the task of the State, through education and enlightened laws, to provide the material conditions of happiness. To do this, the State must emancipate itself from the influence of the Church. Although Church and State seem symbiotic, the priesthood merely a spiritual police force to complement the secular. In essence, Church and State are in conflict: the essence and instrument of the State is the law, but the Church demands of believers obedience to the absolute will of God. As law is in conflict with arbitrary will, so the role of citizen is in conflict with that of believer. So the State must become secular, although Feuerbach acknowledges it will be difficult to remove religion from the minds of the people. The means to social reform is through education. Feuerbach's political ideal may be described as a kind of utopian socialism: a benevolent secular State that provides people with a scientific education, organises conditions of life rationally, and encourages mutual love and assistance.

Although Feuerbach humbly thought of himself as a mere disseminator of his brother Ludwig's ideas, there were differences between them. Ludwig's distinctive analysis of the concept of God as alienated 'species being' played little role in Friedrich's writings; Friedrich focused on the nefarious implications of God as absolute arbitrary willpower. The note of social radicalism of the professed 'communist' Ludwig was largely absent from Friedrich, who never clarified whether the secular state he envisioned presiding over a society based on mutual aid, could be established by the existing government by enlightened reform from above, or required a more radical change of system. Another difference concerns the role Friedrich assigns to the secular State in establishing conditions of universal happiness and enlightenment about religion; Ludwig places much less emphasis on the state and seems rather more hostile to it.

In 2018, the Center of International Feuerbach Research at the University of Münster published the results of a conference concerning the relationship of Friedrich and Ludwig Feuerbach. Friedrich Feuerbach's Religion of Future was interpreted as a practical concept of a secular and public education to bring democracy forward. Following this view, Wilhelm Marr misinterpreted the philosophy of the Feuerbach brothers to an alarming extent.

== Works ==
- Manon Lescaut von Abbé Prévost. Mit einer Charakteristik Prévosts und seiner Romane. (Tr. of Antoine François Prévost's L'Histoire du chevalier des Grieux et de Manon Lescaut, 1731. With an essay on Prévost and his novels.) Erlangen, 1834.
- Theanthropos, eine Reihe von Aphorismen (Theanthropos, a Series of Aphorisms). Zurich, 1838.
- Die Religion der Zukunft, Erstes Heft (The Religion of the Future, First Pamphlet). Zurich, 1843.
- Die Religion der Zukunft, 2. Heft: Die Bestimmung des Menschen. (The Religion of the Future, Second Pamphlet: The Vocation of Man). Nuremberg, 1844.
- Die Religion der Zukunft, 3. Heft: Mensch oder Christ? (The Religion of the Future, Third Pamphlet: Human or Christian?). Nuremberg, 1845.
- Die Kirche der Zukunft (The Church of the Future). Bern, 1847.
- Gedanken und Tatsachen (Thoughts and Facts). Hamburg, 1862.

== Sources ==
Meyers Konversations-Lexikon. 4th edition, vol. 6, Bibliographisches Institut, Leipzig, 1885–1892, p. 203. Online at: http://www.retrobibliothek.de/retrobib/seite.html?id=105645.

Schuffenhauer, W. (ed), 'Ludwig Feuerbach stellt des Bruders Schrift "Gedanken und Thatsachen", 1862, vor.' ('Ludwig Feuerbach introduces his brother's work Thoughts and Facts, 1862.' In: Braun, H.J., H.M. Sass, W. Schuffenhauer and F. Tomasoni (ed's), Ludwig Feuerbach und die Philosophie der Zukunft. Berlin, 1990, pp. 763–785.
Online at: http://www.ludwig-feuerbach.de/lf_frf.htm.

Radbruch, G., 'Die Feuerbachs. Eine geistige Dynastie.' In: Gestalten und Gedanken. Acht Studien. Leipzig 1942, p. 175 f.

Spoerri, Th., Genie und Krankheit. Eine psychopathologische Untersuchung der Familie Feuerbach. Basel/New York, 1952, pp. 73–76.

Kantzenbach, F.W., 'Im Schatten des Größeren. Friedrich Feuerbach, Bruder und Gesinnungsgefährte Ludwig Feuerbachs.' In: Mitteilungen des Vereins für Geschichte der Stadt Nürnberg, vol. 57. Nuremberg, 1970, pp. 281–306.

Stephan Schlüter, Thassilo Polcik, Jan Thumann (Ed.): Philosophie und Pädagogik der Zukunft. Ludwig und Friedrich Feuerbach im Dialog. Münster 2018.

Ursula Reitemeyer: Religion oder Pädagogik der Zukunft? Friedrich Feuerbachs Entwurf einer Menschenbildung in nicht-konfessioneller Absicht. In: Olaf Briese, Martin Friedrich (Ed.): Religion - Religionskritik - Religiöse Transformation im Vormärz, Bielefeld 2015, p 155–173. http://www.vormaerz.de/jahrbuch.html#Jahrbuch%20FVF%2020
