= Stuttgart-Untertürkheim–Kornwestheim railway =

Railway line in Germany

Stuttgart-Untertürkheim–Kornwestheim
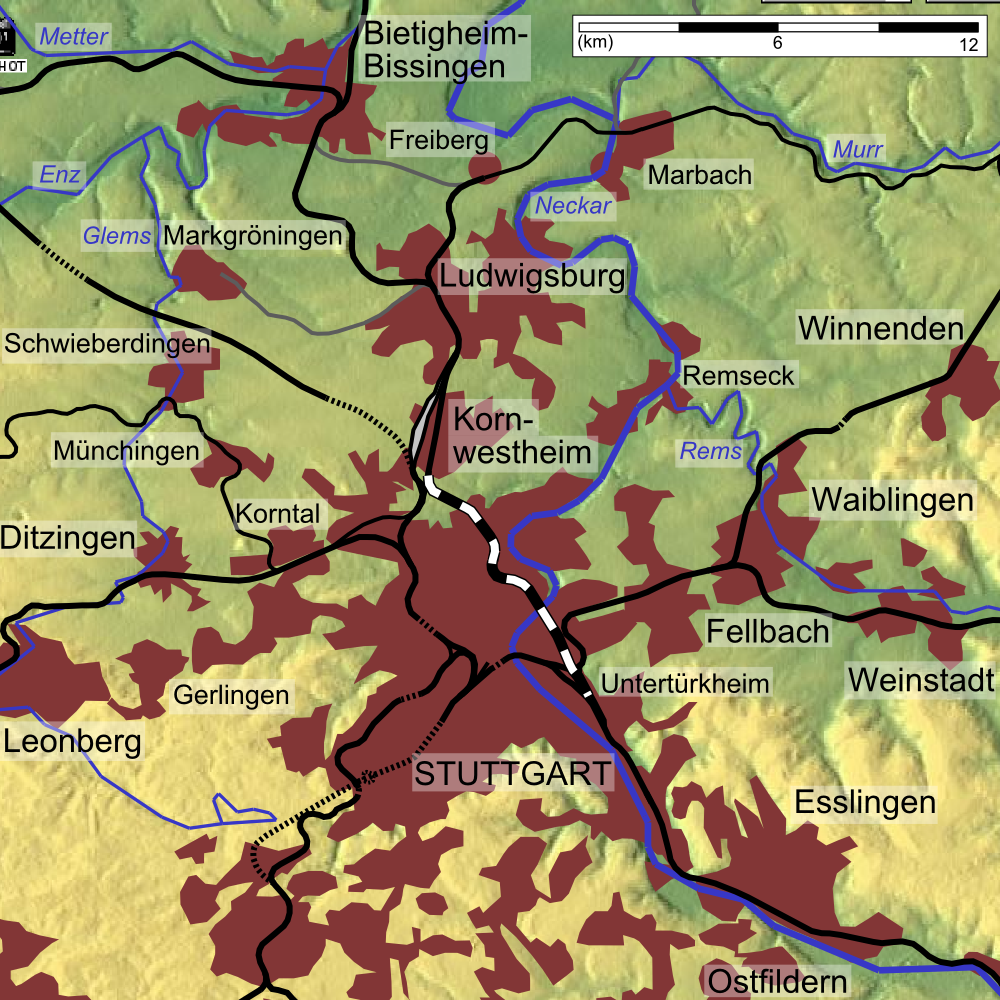

Overview
- Line number: 4720
- Locale: Baden-Württemberg, Germany

Service
- Route number: 790.11

Technical
- Line length: 11.5 km (7.1 mi)
- Minimum radius: 350 m (1,148 ft)
- Electrification: 15 kV/16.7 Hz AC overhead catenary

The Stuttgart-Untertürkheim–Kornwestheim railway (known regionally as the Schusterbahn) is an 11.5-kilometre-long freight bypass in the German state of Baden-Württemberg. The double-track electrified main line connects Untertürkheim with Kornwestheim and serves primarily as a bypass for freight around Stuttgart Central Station (Hauptbahnhof). In the Deutsche Bahn timetable as route 790.11.

== History ==
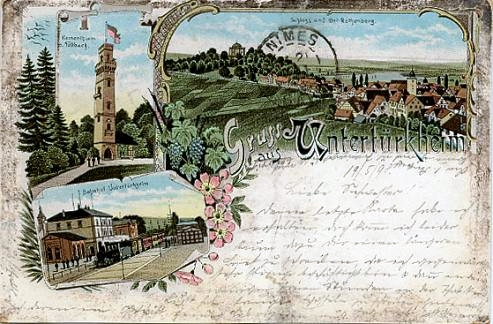
Untertürkheim station in 1898

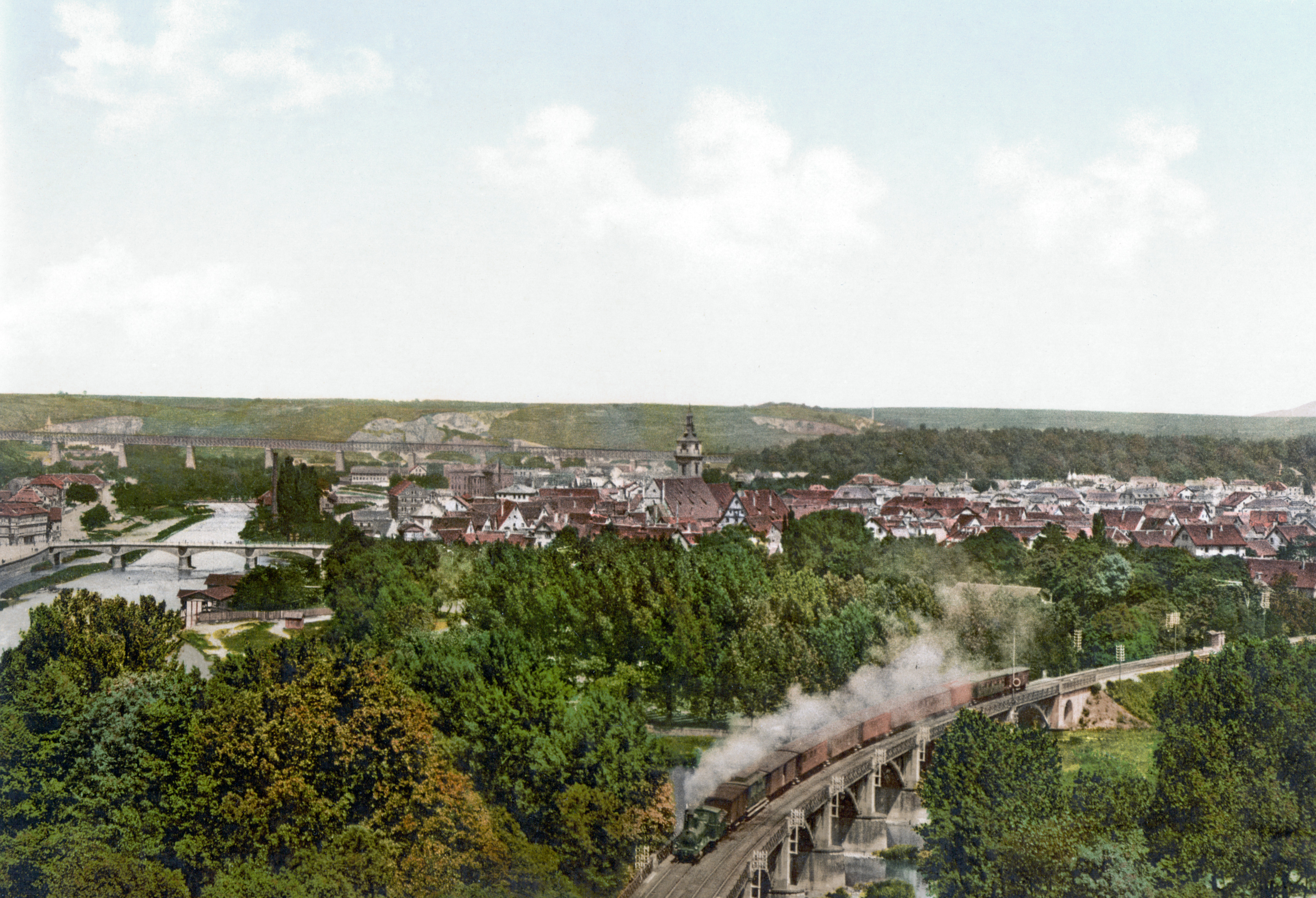
Cannstatt in 1900, Rosenstein Bridge in the foreground, King Wilhelm Viaduct in the background

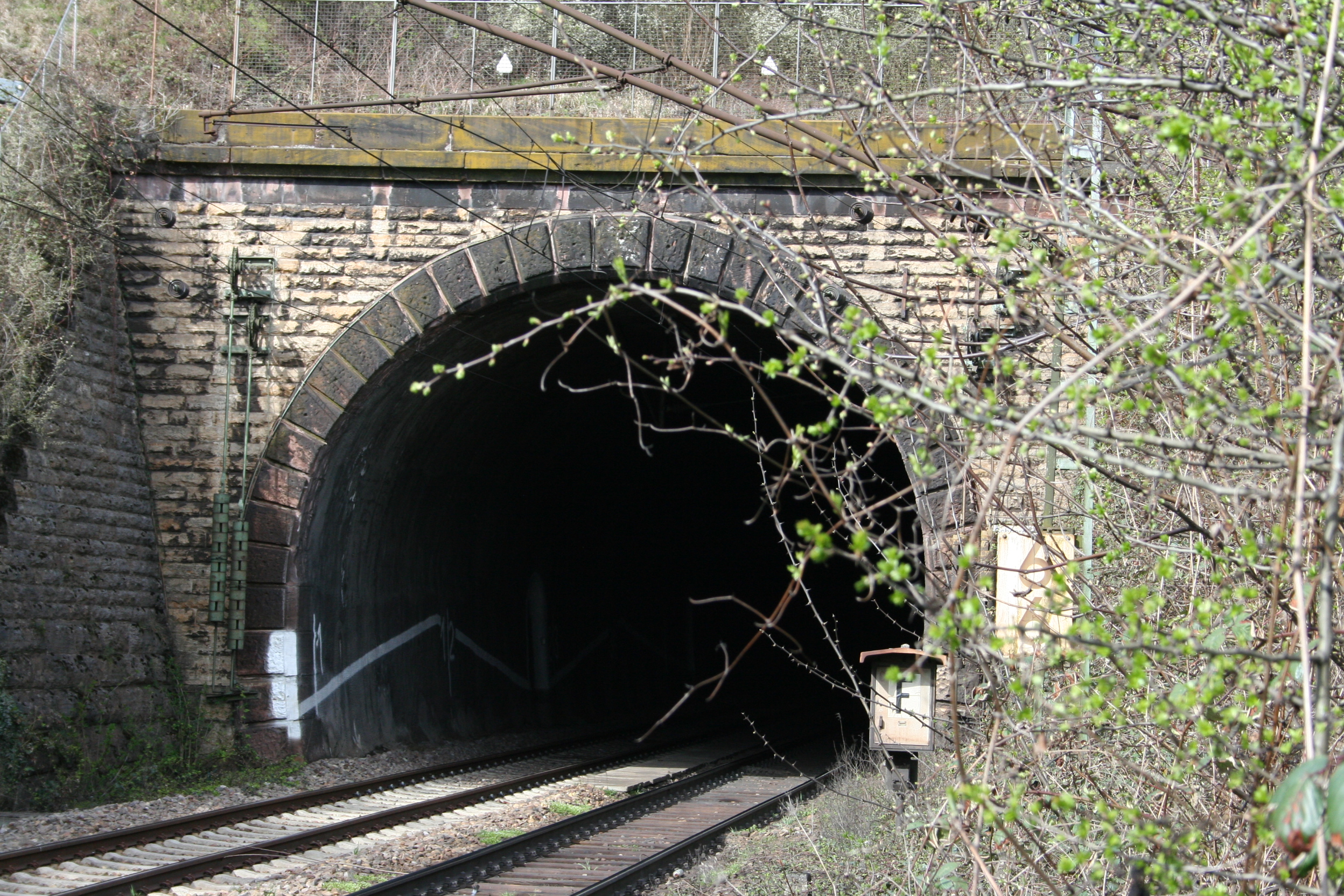
Schnarrenberg Tunnel

The name Schusterbahn (“Shoemaker Railway”) refers to the Salamander shoe factory founded in Kornwestheim by a relative of Albert Einstein in 1899. The passenger trains on the route mainly served employees of the shoe factory and the railways, as Untertürkheim and Kornwestheim both contained the homes of many railway workers, and ended originally in Kornwestheim not at Kornwestheim station, but to its east in the old Kornwestheim marshalling yard, the remains of which were demolished after the completion, in 1918, of the new marshalling yard, which is separate from and to the west of Kornwestheim station.

The line was opened on 30 September 1896 with the inauguration of Stuttgart-Münster station in order to bypass the Stuttgart Central Station (Zentralbahnhof). Previously, all freight trains in Stuttgart had to operate through the Central Station, the predecessor of the current Stuttgart Hauptbahnhof (“central” or “main station”), which, like the current station, was a terminus, requiring all through trains to reverse.

At its opening on 1 October 1896, the line was single track, with its foundations and its engineering works already prepared for a second track. Due to increasing traffic, the government made available a million marks for the construction of the second track on 23 January 1902. In the winter of 1901/1902 it was served by some 50 freight and five passenger trains daily. Under several pieces of legislation in 1902, 1903 and 1905, a total of 1.8 million marks was allocated for the project. The second track was put into operation on 23 September 1904.

== Route ==
In Untertürkheim the line branches from the Fils Valley Railway (Filstalbahn) from Plochingen and Ulm and passes through Untertürkheim freight yard. A rail link makes a direct transition to the Rems Railway (Remsbahn) possible from the south, while trains coming from the north must pass through to the freight yard. In Bad Cannstatt, the line passes through the Kurpark (spa park) and over the Neckar on the Stuttgart-Münster viaduct at a height of 30 metres.

The line leaves the Neckar valley passing through the Schnarrenberg Tunnel then the Feuerbach valley is crossed between Rot and Zazenhausen over a second viaduct. On the southern outskirts of Kornwestheim the tracks lead onto the Franconia Railway (Frankenbahn), the Kornwestheim marshalling yard and the Mannheim–Stuttgart high-speed railway.

=== Structures ===
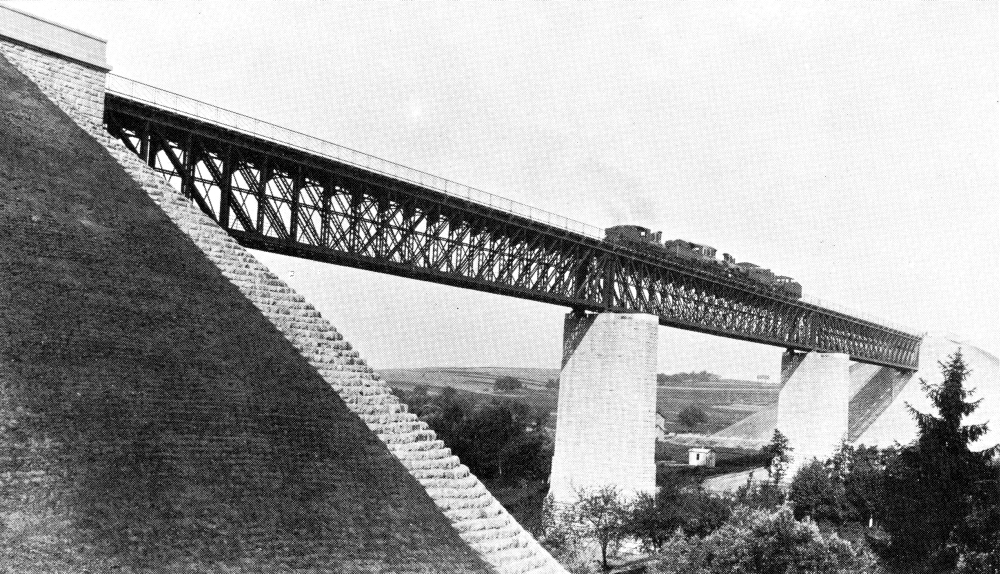
Stress testing of the Zazenhausenen Viaduct in 1896

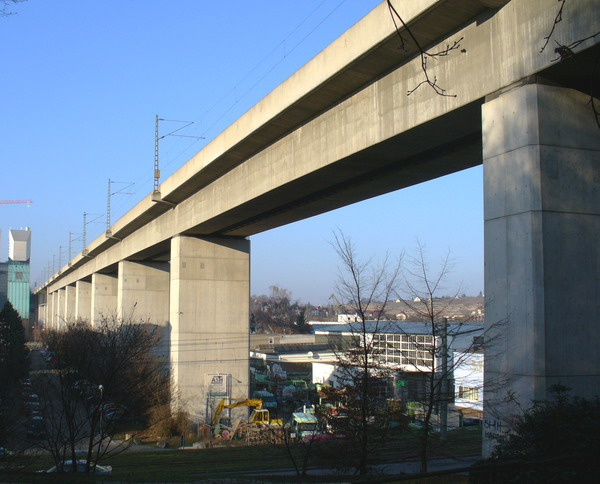
Stuttgart-Münster Viaduct in 2006

The 855 m long Stuttgart-Münster Viaduct over the Neckar was built in 1896 as the König (king) Wilhelm Viaduct as an iron truss structure and replaced in 1985 by a new reinforced concrete structure.

Between Münster and Zazenhausen is the 272 m long Schnarrenberg Tunnel. The tunnel was renovated during 1999–2000, replacing the brick lining with a concrete lining.

The viaduct over the Feuerbach, like that over the Neckar, was replaced in 1980 by a concrete structure parallel with the original construction. Zazenhausen station was moved to the south-west to a new station that is directly below line U 7 of the Stuttgart Stadtbahn. At the end of 2010, the Ebitzweg station on Stadtbahn line U 13 was commissioned, thus establishing a direct connection with the Untertürkheim–Kornwestheim line.

== Traffic ==
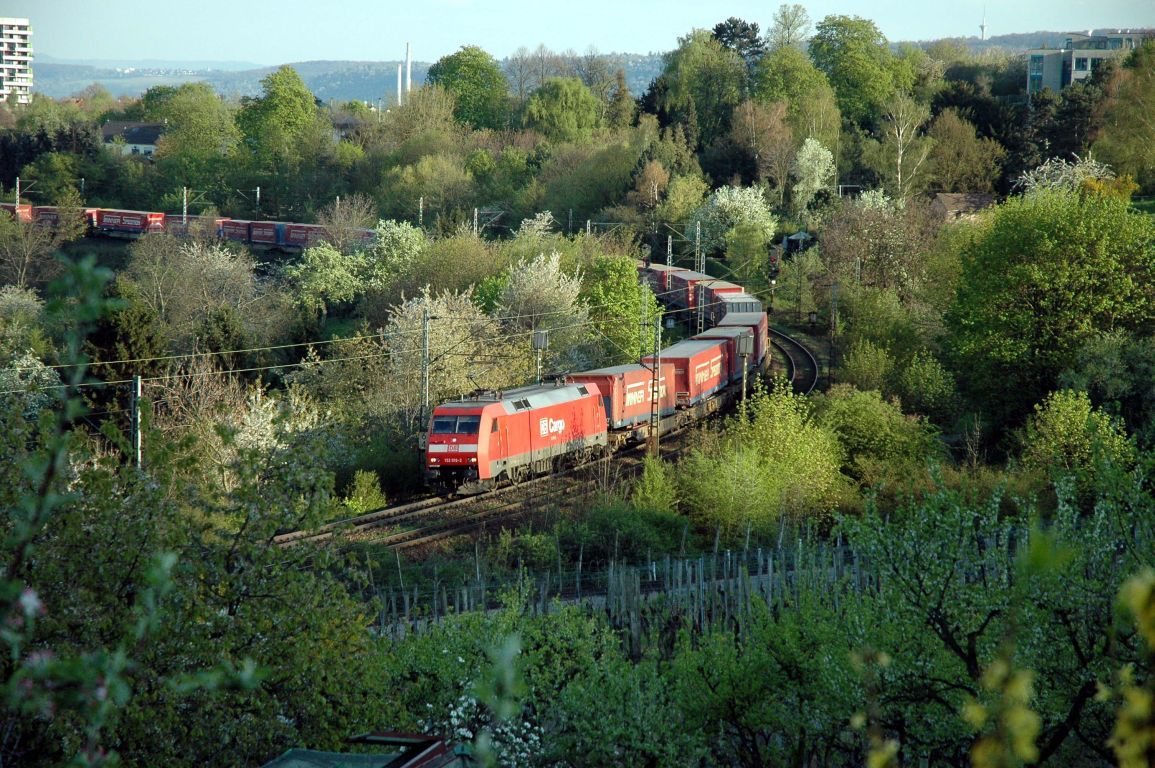
Freight train between Münster and Zazenhausen

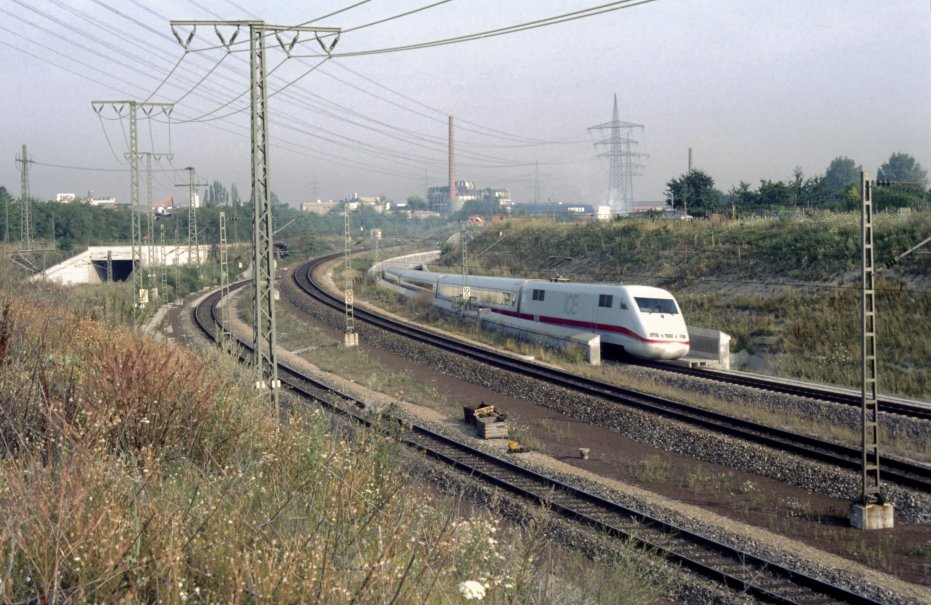
An ICE Sprinter running from Untertürkheim towards the Langes Feld Tunnel

Up to 120 freight trains run on the freight bypass railway daily.

=== Passengers ===
Regionalbahn service RB 11 (formerly R 11) currently operates 12 services on the line on weekdays using class 426 electric multiple units. 6 services operate from Kornwestheim via Zazenhausen, Münster and Ebitzweg to Untertürkheim and 6 operate the return leg.

Due to the ongoing construction due to the reconfiguration of Stuttgart Main Station, some ICE trains also utilise this line such as the ICE 224 between Munich and Amsterdam.

Before the cessation of City Night Line, the 419 service, which sometimes ran all the way from Amsterdam to Munich (for example, in September and October 2009) without stopping in Stuttgart Hauptbahnhof, but only stopped at Ludwigsburg and Plochingen. On these nights, it ran around 4:00 AM on the Stuttgart-Untertürkheim–Kornwestheim line. It was also served from 1992 to 2006 by one pair of ICE Sprinter service bypassing Stuttgart Hauptbahnhof. In addition, it is also used by some diverted trains (e.g. when access to Stuttgart Hauptbahnhof is blocked).
