= Friedrich Wilhelm Heidenreich =

German physician (1798–1857)

Friedrich Wilhelm Heidenreich (2 September 1798 in Roßtal – 6 December 1857 in Ansbach) was a German medical doctor. He was a brother-in-law to archaeologist Joseph Anselm Feuerbach who married his sister Henriette.

From 1817 to 1821, he studied medicine at the University of Würzburg, obtaining his doctorate with a dissertation titled Tubercula in cerebro reperta. Following graduation, he worked as a physician in the cities of Roth and Nuremberg. From 1824 onward, he maintained a medical practice in Ansbach.

Heidenreich notably took part in the autopsy of Kaspar Hauser, following the latter's mysterious death in December 1833. As a result of his findings, he published the treatise Kaspar Hauser's Verwundung, Krankheit und Leichenöffnung ("Kaspar Hauser's wounds, illness and autopsy").

== Selected works ==
- Orthopaedie; oder, Werth der Mechanik zur Heilung der Verkrümmungen am menschlichen Leibe, 1827 – Orthopedics; value of the mechanism for healing the curvature of the human body.
- Revision der neuern Ansichten und Behandlung von Croup, 1841 – Revision of modern views and treatment of croup.
- Der Kropf; chirurgische Monographie, 1845 – The goiter. a surgical monograph.
- Vorkehr und Verfahren gegen die Cholera, 1854 – Precautions and measures against cholera.
- Elemente der therapeutischen Physik.1854 – Elements of therapeutic physics.
