= Kaspar Hauser =

German youth of mysterious background (1812–1833)

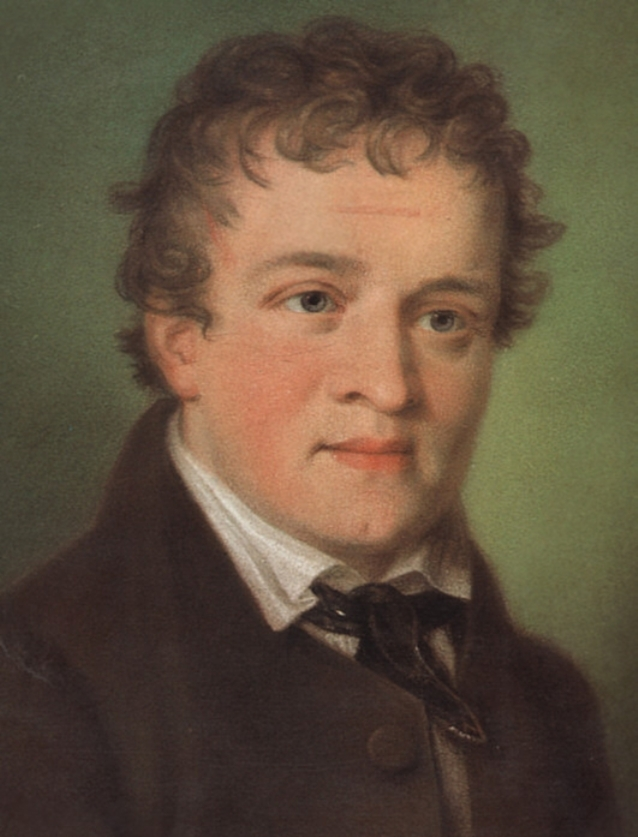
- Hauser in 1830
- Born: 30 April 1812
- Died: 17 December 1833 (aged 21); Ansbach, Bavaria, German Confederation
- Cause of death: Stab wound
- Known for: Claimed unusual upbringing and subsequent mysterious death

Kaspar Hauser (30 April 1812 – 17 December 1833) was a German youth who claimed to have grown up in the total isolation of a darkened cell. His claims, and his subsequent death from a stab wound, sparked much debate and controversy both in Nuremberg and abroad.

Hauser's true identity and origin remain unknown. Theories propounded at the time speculated that Hauser might be a member of the grand ducal House of Baden, hidden away because of dynastic intrigue. However, this theory had always been controversial and is largely dismissed by historians today, and there were also always allegations that Hauser was an impostor. In 2024, a scientific study ruled out Hauser's princely descent by comparing mitochondrial DNA haplotypes with the House of Baden.

== Biography ==
=== First appearance in Nuremberg ===
On 26 May 1828, Hauser, then a teenage boy, was found wandering the streets of Nuremberg, then part of the Kingdom of Bavaria (now Germany), carrying two letters. The first letter was addressed to a Captain von Wessenig, commander of the 4th squadron of the 6th cavalry regiment in Nuremberg. Its heading read:

Von der Bäierischen Gränz

daß Orte ist unbenant

1828

"From the Bavarian border

The place is unnamed

1828"

The anonymous author of this letter said that he had assumed custody of Hauser as an infant on 7 October 1812. The author said he had taught him reading, writing and the Christian religion, but never let him "take a single step out of my house." The letter stated that Hauser would like to become a cavalryman "as his father was." The letter invited von Wessenig either to take in Hauser or hang him.

The second letter was purportedly written by Hauser's mother to his former caretaker. It stated that the boy's name was Kaspar, that he was born on 30 April 1812 and that his deceased father had been a cavalryman of the 6th regiment. Writing analysts in later years concluded that the same person wrote both letters. The line from the letter "he writes my handwriting exactly as I do" led them to assume that Hauser wrote both of them.

A shoemaker named Weickmann brought Hauser to von Wessenig's house. Once there, Hauser only repeated the words, "I want to be a cavalryman, as my father was" and, "Horse! Horse!" Any attempts at gaining more information caused Hauser to cry or simply repeat, "Don't know." Von Wessenig sent Hauser to a police station, where he wrote his name for the first time. While being examined by police, Hauser showed familiarity with money and the ability to say some prayers and a small measure of reading. However, he answered few of their questions and demonstrated a limited vocabulary. Authorities ultimately decided that Hauser was a vagrant and sent him to prison.

Hauser spent the following two months in Luginsland Tower in Nuremberg Castle, in the care of jailer Andreas Hiltel. Contrary to many later accounts, observers described Hauser as being in good physical condition and able to walk well; for example, he could climb over ninety steps by himself to his room. He had a "healthy facial complexion" and was judged to be approximately sixteen years old but appeared to be intellectually impaired. Mayor Binder, however, claimed that Hauser had an excellent memory and was a quick learner. Various curious people visited Hauser to his apparent delight. He refused all food except bread and water.

==== Hauser's account of life in a dungeon ====
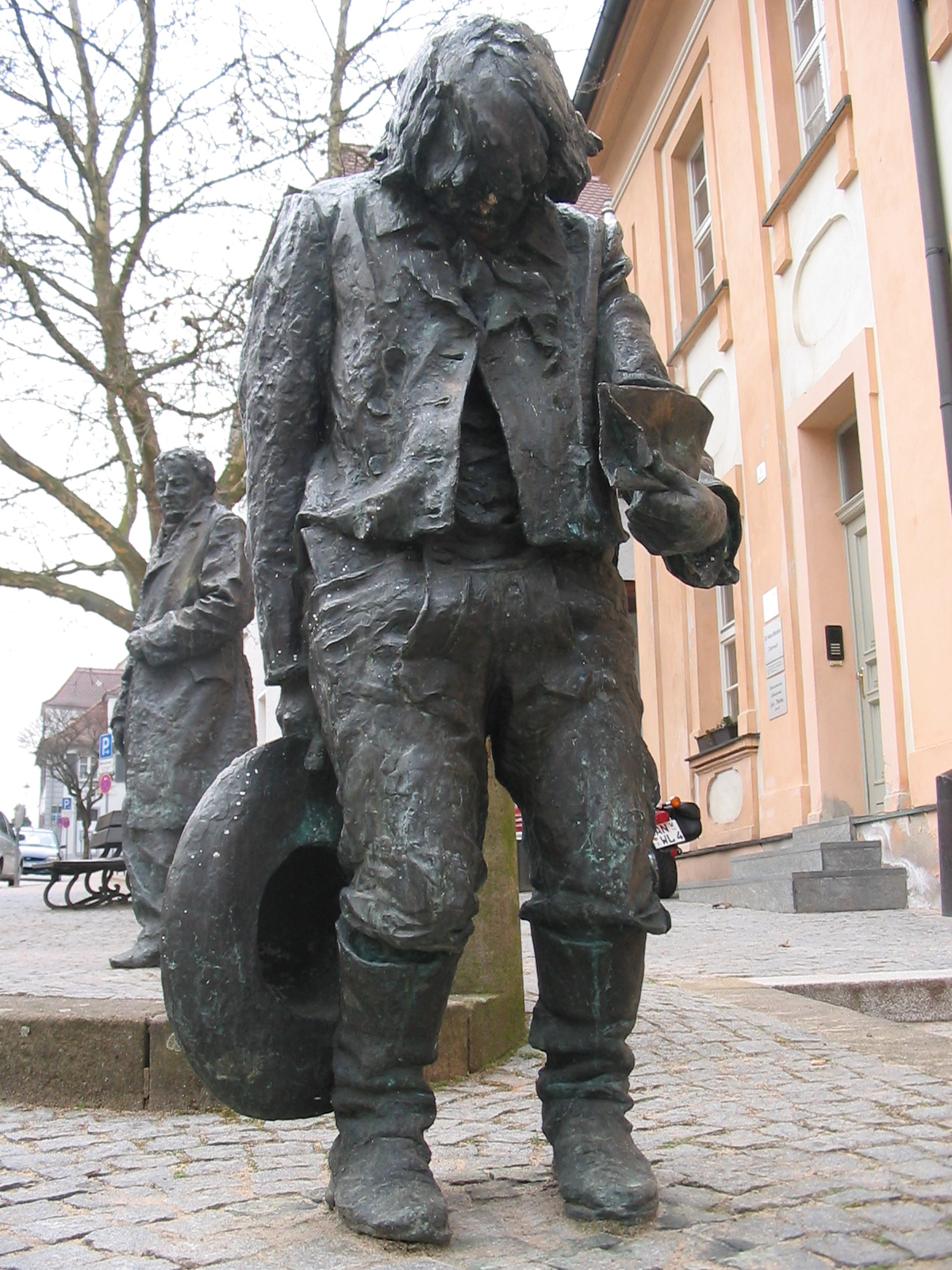
Statue of Hauser, Ansbach, Germany

At first, most assumed that Hauser was a person with a developmental disability, who had wandered out of the forest. During the course of many conversations with Binder, Hauser told a different version of his past life, which he later wrote down in more detail.

According to Hauser's account, he had spent his youth living in solitary confinement in a dark cell. He claimed that he found rye bread and water next to his bed each morning. At times, the water would taste bitter and drinking it would cause him to sleep more deeply than usual. On such occasions, upon awakening, Hauser noticed that someone had changed his straw and cut his hair and nails. Hauser claimed that the person he met was a masked man who visited him shortly before his release. The visitor taught him to write his own name, stand and walk. The visitor then brought Hauser to Nuremberg, where he taught him to say the phrase, "I want to be a cavalryman, as my father was" (in Old Bavarian dialect). Hauser claimed not to understand its meaning at the time.

=== Further life in Nuremberg ===
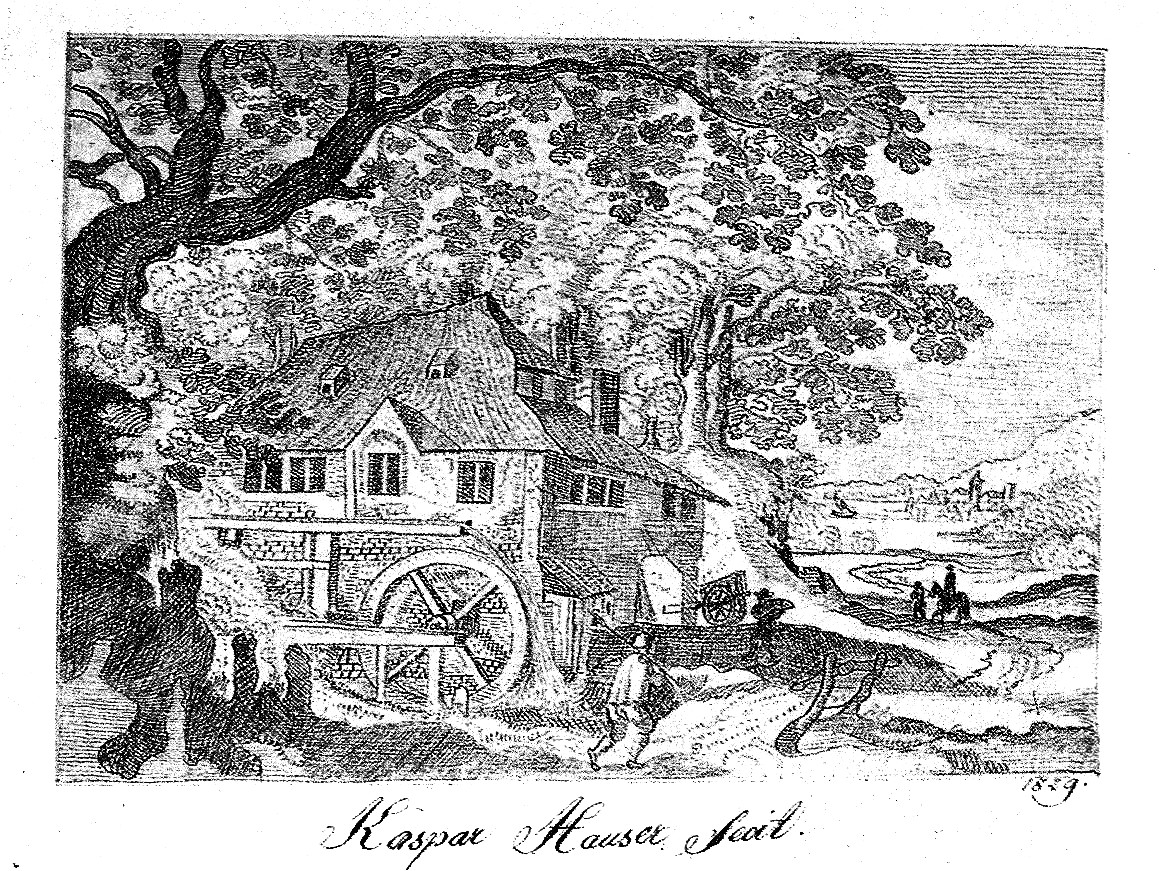
Pencil drawing by Hauser, 1829

Paul Johann Anselm Ritter von Feuerbach, president of the Bavarian court of appeals, began to investigate the case. Hauser was formally adopted by the town of Nuremberg and its citizens donated money for his upkeep and education. The town placed him into the care of Friedrich Daumer, a schoolmaster and speculative philosopher. Daumer taught Hauser various subjects and uncovered his talent for drawing.

Hauser appeared to flourish with Daumer, who subjected him to homeopathy and magnetic experiments. As Feuerbach told the story, "When Professor Daumer held the north pole [of a magnet] towards him, Kaspar put his hand to the pit of his stomach, and, drawing his waistcoat in an outward direction, said that it drew him thus; and that a current of air seemed to proceed from him. The south pole affected him less powerfully; and he said that it blew upon him."

==== Cut wound ====
On 17 October 1829, Hauser was found in the cellar of Daumer's house bleeding from a wound to his forehead. He claimed that while sitting in the outhouse, a hooded man attacked him, saying: "You still have to die before you leave the city of Nuremberg." Hauser said he recognised the speaker as the man who had brought him to Nuremberg in 1828. As was obvious from his blood trail, Hauser at first fled into the house to the first floor, then went downstairs and climbed through a trap door into the cellar.

Alarmed officials called for a police escort and transferred Hauser to the care of Johann Biberbach, a municipal authority. The alleged attack fueled rumours about Hauser's possible ancestry from Hungary, England or the House of Baden. Skeptics believed that Hauser had deliberately cut himself with a razor, then left it in his room on the first floor before hiding in the cellar. Hauser had recently quarrelled with Daumer, who had accused him of lying. Hauser might have staged the attack to gain sympathy and avoid further reprimand from Daumer.

==== "Pistol accident" ====
On 3 April 1830, a pistol shot went off in Hauser's room at the Biberbachs' house. His escort hurriedly entered the room and found him unconscious, bleeding from a head wound. Quickly reviving, Hauser stated that he had climbed on a chair to get some books from a shelf. The chair had fallen and he reached to grab something to stop his fall. By mistake, he grabbed a pistol hanging on the wall, which then discharged and wounded him.

Again, people were dubious of Hauser's story. His head wound seemed too superficial to have been caused by a gunshot. He had also been recently reproached by the Biberbach family for lying. Mrs Biberbach commented on Hauser's "horrendous mendacity" and "art of dissimulation" and called him "full of vanity and spite." Having outstayed his welcome in the Biberbach household, the town of Nuremberg transferred Hauser in May 1830 to the house of Baron von Tucher. The baron later complained about Hauser's exorbitant vanity and lies.

=== Lord Stanhope ===
A British nobleman, Lord Stanhope, took an interest in Hauser and gained custody of him late in 1831. He spent a great deal of money attempting to clarify Hauser's origin. He promised Hauser that he would eventually take him to England.

Stanhope took Hauser to Hungary on two trips hoping to jog the boy's memory. He claimed to remember some Hungarian words and had once declared that a Hungarian Countess Maytheny was his mother. However, Hauser failed to recognise any buildings or monuments in Hungary. A Hungarian nobleman who had met Hauser later told Stanhope that he and his son had a good laugh when they remembered Hauser and his histrionic behaviour.

The failures of the two Hungarian trips led Stanhope to doubt Hauser's credibility. In December 1831 he transferred Hauser to a schoolmaster named Johann Georg Meyer in Ansbach, under the patronage of Anselm von Feuerbach. The last time that Stanhope saw Hauser was in January 1832, although he continued to pay Hauser's living expenses.

=== Life and death in Ansbach ===
Meyer was a strict and pedantic man who disliked Hauser's excuses and apparent lies. By late 1832, Hauser was employed as a copyist in the local law office. Still hoping that Stanhope would take him to England, Hauser was dissatisfied with his life in Ansbach. When von Feuerbach died in May 1833, Hauser mourned his loss.

However, some authors point out that von Feuerbach had lost faith in Hauser by the end of his life. He wrote a note saying, "Caspar Hauser is a smart scheming codger, a rogue, a good-for-nothing that ought to be killed." However, there is no indication that von Feuerbach, already seriously ill, let Hauser know these feelings.

==== Fatal stab wound ====
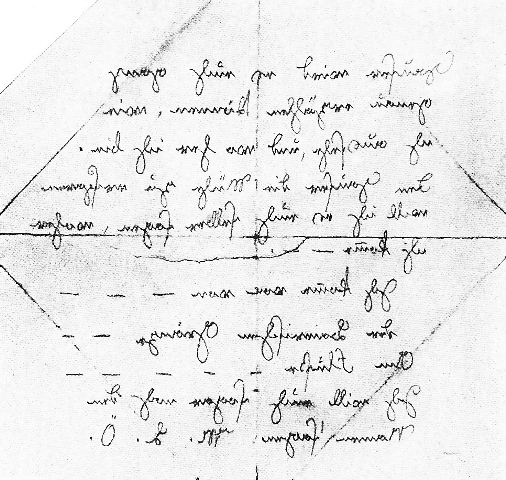
A photograph of the note, in mirror writing. The original has been missing since 1945.

On 9 December 1833, Hauser and Meyer had a serious argument. Stanhope was expected to visit Ansbach at Christmas, and Meyer stated that he did not know how he would face him.

Five days later, on 14 December, Hauser came back to Meyer's house with a deep chest wound. He claimed to have been lured to the Ansbach Court Garden, where a stranger stabbed him while handing him a purse. He was eager for authorities to find the purse he had left behind but did not ask about its contents. As he progressively deteriorated, Hauser muttered incoherently about "writing with pencil". Hauser died of his wound three days later on 17 December.

When a policeman searched the Court Garden, he found a small violet purse containing a pencilled note in Spiegelschrift (mirror writing). The message read, in German:

"Hauser will be able to tell you quite precisely how I look and from where I am. To save Hauser the effort, I want to tell you myself from where I come _ _ . I come from from _ _ _ the Bavarian border _ _ On the river _ _ _ _ _ I will even tell you the name: M. L. Ö."

Inconsistencies in Hauser's account led the Ansbach court of enquiry to suspect that he had stabbed himself and then invented a tale about being attacked. The note in the purse contained a spelling error and a grammatical error, both of which were typical for Hauser. The note itself was folded into a specific triangular form, in the way in which Hauser typically folded his letters, according to Mrs Meyer.

Forensic examiners agreed that Hauser's chest wound might have been self-inflicted. Many authors believe that he had wounded himself again to revive public interest in his story and to persuade Stanhope to take him to England. However, this time Hauser fatally injured himself by mistake.

==== Burial ====
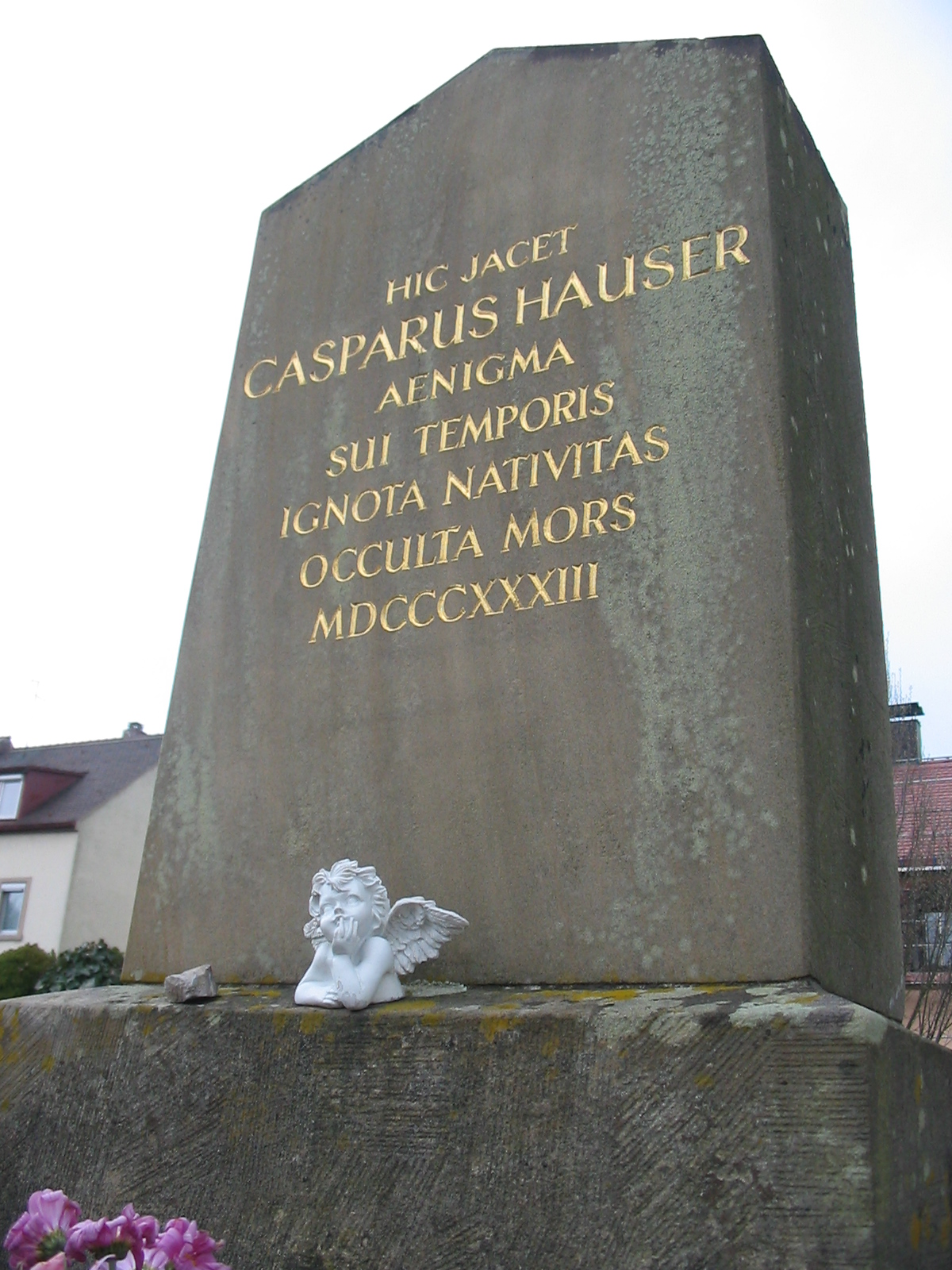
Hauser's tombstone, reading: Hic jacet Casparus Hauser Aenigma sui temporis ignota nativitas occulta mors MDCCCXXXIII

Hauser was buried in the Stadtfriedhof (city cemetery) in Ansbach. His headstone reads, in Latin, "Here lies Kaspar Hauser, riddle of his time. His birth was unknown, his death mysterious. 1833." A monument to Hauser was later erected in the Court Garden which reads Hic occultus occulto occisus est, meaning, "Here a mysterious one was killed in a mysterious manner."

After Hauser's death, Stanhope published a book in which he presented all known evidence against Hauser, taking it as his "duty openly to confess that I had been deceived." Some of Hauser's followers believed that Stanhope had ulterior motives in befriending him and had connections to the House of Baden. By contrast, some scholarly authors defend Stanhope as a philanthropist, a pious man and a seeker of truth.

== Medical opinions ==
Friedrich Wilhelm Heidenreich, a physician present at Hauser's autopsy, claimed that his brain was notable for its small cortical size and its few non-distinct cortical gyri, indicative to some that he suffered from cortical atrophy or, as G. Hesse argued, from epilepsy. Heidenreich may have been influenced by his phrenological ideas when examining Hauser's brain. Dr Albert, who conducted the autopsy and wrote the official report, found no anomalies in Hauser's brain.

A 1928 medical study supported the view that Hauser had self-inflicted the wound and accidentally stabbed himself too deeply. A 2005 forensic analysis argued that it seems "unlikely that the stab to the chest was inflicted exclusively for the purpose of self-damage, but neither a suicidal stab or a homicidal act (assassination) can be definitely ruled out."

A 2023 study indicated that when he showed up in Nuremberg, Hauser had the markings of a cowpox vaccination, meant to prevent smallpox. These vaccinations had been mandatory in Bavaria since 1807. The young Hauser would have had to visit a vaccination site to get this, accompanied by an adult. This evidence further discredited Hauser's claim to have grown up without human contact.

=== Psychological viewpoints ===
Hauser's various accounts of his incarceration include several contradictions. In 1970, psychiatrist Karl Leonhard stated that:

"If he had been living since childhood under the conditions he describes, he would not have developed beyond the condition of an idiot; indeed he would not have remained alive long. His tale is so full of absurdities that it is astonishing that it was ever believed and is even today still believed by many people."

Leonhard rejected the views of both Heidenreich and Hesse, contending that:

"Kaspar Hauser was, as other authors already opined, a pathological swindler. In addition to his hysterical make-up he probably had the persistence of a paranoid personality since he was able to play his role so imperturbably. From many reports on his behaviour one can recognise the hysterical as well as the paranoid trend of his personality."

== "Hereditary prince" theory ==
=== Rumours ===
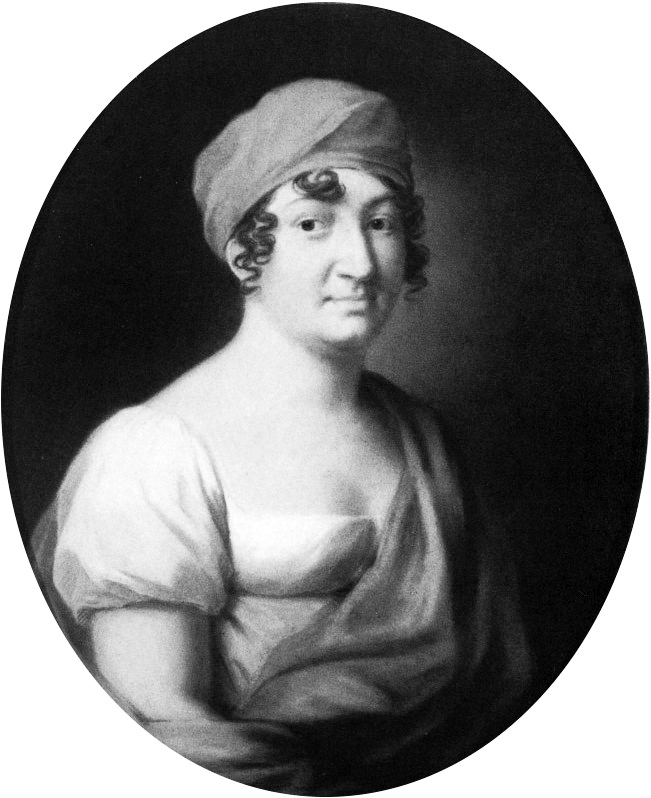
The Countess of Hochberg

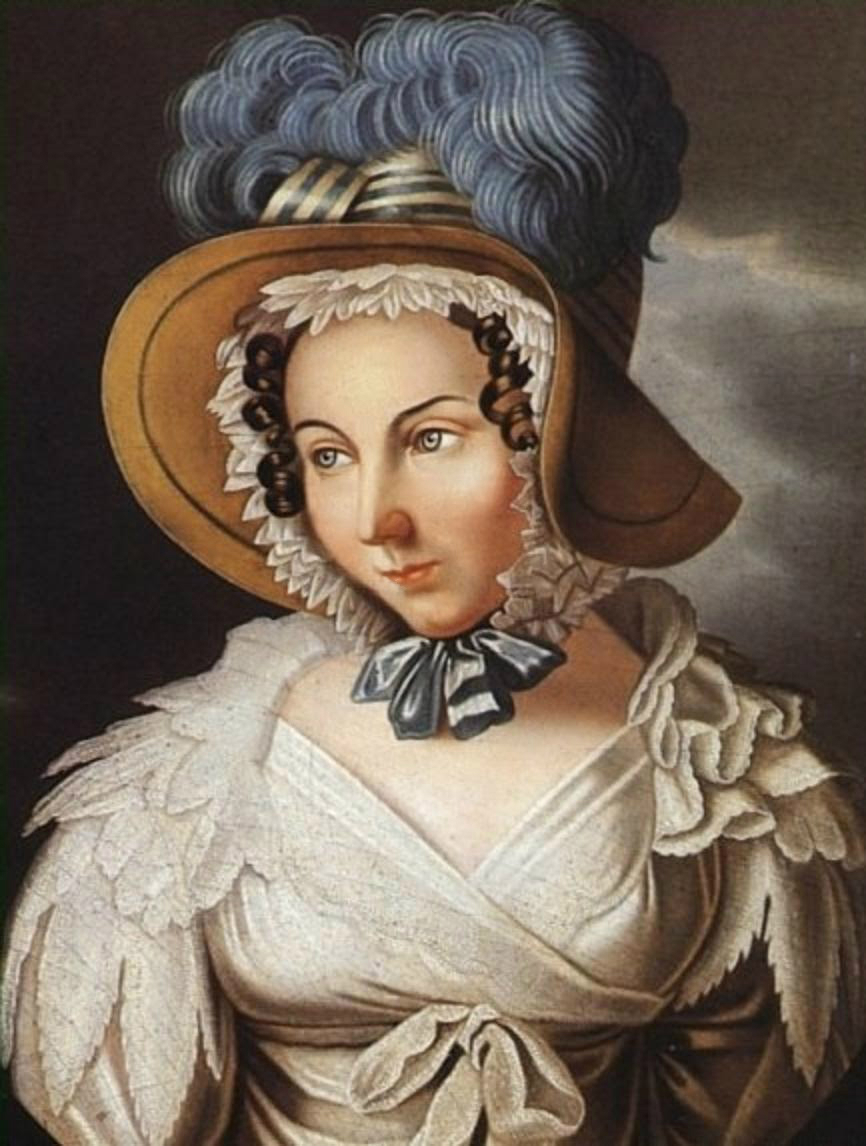
The Grand Duchess Stéphanie

According to contemporary rumours, circa 1829, Hauser was the hereditary prince of Baden, who allegedly had been switched at birth with a commoner. The infant prince of Baden was born on 29 September 1812. His parents were Charles, Grand Duke of Baden and Stéphanie de Beauharnais, a cousin by marriage and the adopted daughter of Napoleon Bonaparte. The infant prince died on 16 October 1812 after a few weeks. When his father Charles died in 1818, he had no sons to succeed him. Charles' successor was his uncle, Louis I, who was succeeded in 1830 by Louis' half-brother, Leopold I.

The rumour was that Louise Caroline of Hochberg, Leopold's mother, had been scheming to put her son on the throne in Baden. Disguising herself as a ghost, the so-called "White Lady", she sneaked into the nursery of the infant prince, kidnapped him and replaced him with a dying baby. The infant prince was then incarcerated for 16 years, until he emerged as Hauser in Nuremberg in 1828. The rumour also linked Hauser's stabbing death in 1833 with a conspiracy to prevent him from challenging the legitimacy of Leopold I.

=== Evidence uncovered in the 1870s ===
In 1876, Otto Mittelstädt presented evidence against the hereditary prince theory, with official documents concerning the infant prince's emergency baptism, autopsy and burial. In his Historical Mysteries, Andrew Lang summarises the results:

"It is true that the Grand Duchess was too ill to be permitted to see her dead baby, in 1812, but the baby's father, grandmother, and aunt, with the ten Court physicians, the nurses and others, must have seen it, in death, and it is too absurd to suppose, on no authority, that they were all parties to the White Lady's plot."

Historian Fritz Trautz went so far as to write that, "The silly fairytale, which to this day moves many pens and has found much belief, was fully disproved in Otto Mittelstädt's book." Letters of the Grand Duke's mother, published in 1951, give detailed accounts of the infant prince's birth, illness and death, which would also disprove the hereditary prince theory.

=== DNA analyses ===
In November 1996, the German magazine Der Spiegel reported an attempt to genetically match a blood sample from underwear thought to have been Hauser's. This analysis was performed in laboratories at the Forensic Science Service in Birmingham, England, and the Institute of Legal Medicine at LMU Munich in Germany. Comparisons with descendants of the princely family proved that the blood examined could not have come from the hereditary prince of Baden.

In 2024, a new study corroborating previous analysis by massively parallel sequencing ruled out the prince theory by demonstrating that the mitochondrial DNA haplotypes in all samples attributed to Hauser including the previously examined blood sample were identical and different from the mitochondrial lineage of the House of Baden.

== Cultural references ==
=== Literature ===
A passing reference to Hauser is made in Herman Melville's novella Billy Budd. He is presented as an example of a person with a primitive, yet virtuous, personality.

Paul Verlaine wrote a poem called "Gaspard Hauser chante," "[Kaspar Hauser sings"] also known by its incipit, "Je suis venu, calme orphelin" [I came, a calm orphan"].

In 1913, Georg Trakl wrote the poem "Kaspar Hauser Lied" ("Kaspar Hauser Song"). It alludes to the works by Paul Verlaine and Jakob Wassermann, and has been called the "most striking" expression of a literary trope in which Kaspar Hauser "stood for the natural, poetic genius lost in a strange world, lacking a home, a sense of origin and attachment, and fearing a violent but uncertain future." The philosopher Martin Heidegger cited this poem in his essay on poetry and language, Unterwegs zur Sprache.

The 1963 Robert A. Heinlein novel, Glory Road mentions Hauser being a refugee from another universe.

Kaspar, a play written by Austrian playwright Peter Handke and published in 1967 depicts "the foundling Kaspar Hauser as a near-speechless innocent destroyed by society's attempts to impose on him its language and its own rational values."

In the same year, Harlan Ellison wrote the short story "The Prowler in the City at the Edge of the World", where it's mentioned that Juliette (who tortured people who were abducted from the past to death) squeezed part of his brain and sent him home. He was later abducted again, fatally stabbed and sent home. Though his name is spelled "Caspar" here.

In 1994, the English poet David Constantine explored the story and its personae in Caspar Hauser: A Poem in Nine Cantos.

Canadian artist Diane Obomsawin tells the story of Kaspar Hauser in her 2007 graphic novel Kaspar; in 2012 it was adapted into the animated short film Kaspar.

=== Film and television ===
Michael Landon played Casper Hauser in the episode The Mystery of Caspar Hauser of the television series Telephone Time in 1956.

Werner Herzog's 1974 film The Enigma of Kaspar Hauser dramatizes Hauser's story. Bruno S., who played the part of Hauser, was an untrained actor whose childhood was marked by physical abuse and stays in mental institutions; Herzog has remarked that he considers him similar to Hauser. The film's German title is Jeder für sich und Gott gegen alle (Every Man for Himself and God Against All), which Herzog also used as the title of his 2022 memoir. In W.G. Sebald's 1992 novel The Emigrants (German: Die Ausgewanderten), a scene from Herzog's film recalls a forgotten photograph to the narrator's mind.

Andre Eisermann played Kaspar Hauser, in the 1993 film Kaspar Hauser.

Galician filmmaker Alberto Gracia made an avant-garde version of Hauser's life in O quinto evanxeo de Gaspar Hauser (2013).

The Legend of Kaspar Hauser (Italian: La leggenda di Kaspar Hauser) is a 2012 Italian surreal drama film written and directed by Davide Manuli. In this modern western-like re-interpretation featuring Vincent Gallo, a music-obsessive Kaspar washes up on a Mediterranean beach, where half a dozen protagonists try to make sense of who he is.

=== Music ===
Hauser's story has inspired numerous musical references. There have been at least two operas named after him, a 2007 work by American composer Elizabeth Swados and a 2010 work by British composer Rory Boyle.

In 1987, Suzanne Vega wrote "Wooden Horse (Caspar Hauser's Song)", based on how she imagined Hauser's experiences when he emerged from the dungeon. In 1994, Birgit Scherzer, then director and choreographer of the Saarbrücken Staatstheater Ballet in Germany, used the Hauser story as the basis for the ballet Kaspar Hauser, which she presented at the Saarbrücken Staatstheater.

=== Non-fiction ===
In his later years, Paul Johann Anselm Ritter von Feuerbach took a deep interest in the fate of Kaspar Hauser. He was the first to publish a critical summary of the ascertained facts, under the title of Kaspar Hauser, ein Beispiel eines Verbrechens am Seelenleben (1832).

Jeffrey Moussaieff Masson wrote Lost Prince: The Unsolved Mystery of Kaspar Hauser (1996). It was also published as The Wild Child: The Unsolved Mystery of Kaspar Hauser (2010).

In a "Kaspar Hauser experiment", a nonhuman animal is reared isolated from members of its own species, in an attempt at determining which behaviors are innate. When applied to humans to investigate language acquisition, they are known as language deprivation experiments.

== See also ==
- List of unsolved deaths
- Man in the Iron Mask
