= TKH =

TKH may refer to:

- Communist Movement of Turkey, a communist party in Turkey
- TKH, the DS100 code for Kornwestheim station, Baden-Württemberg, Germany
- TKH, the IATA code for Takhli Royal Thai Air Force Base, Nakhon Sawan Province, Thailand
