= The Essence of Christianity =

1841 Book by Ludwig Feuerbach

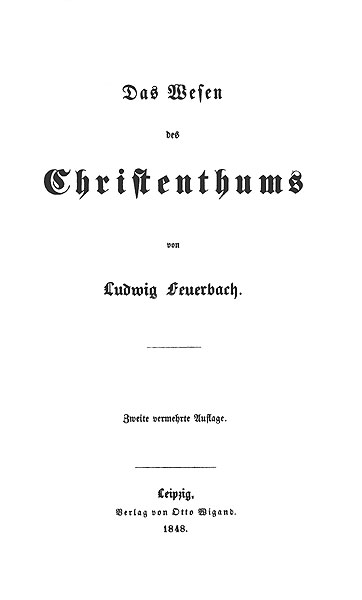
- Title page of the second German edition (1848)
- Author: Ludwig Feuerbach
- Original title: Das Weſen des Chriſtenthums
- Language: German
- Subjects: Humanism; Theology; Criticism of religion
- Published: 1841; 1843; 1848; 1849; 1883
- Publisher: Otto Wigand
- Publication place: Leipzig, Germany
- English publication date: 1854; 1881; 1893
- Text: The Essence of Christianity at Wikisource

The Essence of Christianity (German: Das Wesen des Christentums; historical orthography: Das Weſen des Chriſtenthums) is a book by Ludwig Feuerbach first published in 1841. It explains Feuerbach's philosophy and critique of religion.

Feuerbach, a leading figure among the Young Hegelians, was influenced by Hegel's philosophy regarding the infinite and the finite, but inverted it: rather than understanding finite human qualities as manifestations of an infinite God, as did Hegel, Feuerbach understood the infinite God as an objectification of finite humanity's essential qualities. This is the defining attribute of Feuerbach's critique of religion.

== Summary ==
In Part I of his book, Feuerbach developed what he calls the "true or anthropological essence of religion," treating of God in his various aspects "as a being of the understanding," "as a moral being or law," "as love" and so on. Feuerbach talks of how man is equally a conscious being, more so than God because man has placed upon God the ability of understanding. He explains that, in the contemplation of reality, man really becomes acquainted with himself; from there, Feuerbach shows that God corresponds to some feature or need of human nature in every aspect. "If man is to find contentment in God," he writes, "he must find himself in God."

Thus, for Feuerbach, God is nothing else than man: he is, so to speak, the outward projection of man's inward nature; this projection is dubbed as a chimera. Feuerbach also explores the idea that the conception of God as a higher being is dependent upon the human concept of benevolence. Feuerbach states that "a God who is not benevolent, not just, not wise, is no God." For Feuerbach, these qualities do not source their divinity from their godly association; the godly association is only because these qualities are, themselves, divine. Therefore, man is capable of understanding and applying meanings of divinity to religion, and not the other way around. Feuerbach thereby inverses the traditional formula of subject and predicate within religion: "that which in religion is the predicate, we must make the subject, and that which in religion is a subject we must make a predicate."

Feuerbach explains the attraction to religion, and the attribution of divinity to figures such as God, by arguing that God represents the powers and qualities of humanity itself. God, he writes, "is the principle of [man's] salvation, of [man's] good dispositions and actions, consequently [man's] own good principle and nature." For Feuerbach, religious belief therefore depends upon the attributing of human qualities to God: without such qualities, God would become merely an abstract object devoid of significance, and the sense of God's existence would disappear. Thus, when all human qualities are removed from God, "God is no longer anything more to [man] than a negative being." As a result of the attribution of these qualities to God, however, man becomes alienated from himself, since "God alone is the being who acts of himself." For Feuerbach, this leaves humanity bereft of its proper qualities, as they have been ceded to an abstract, alien being.

In Part II Feuerbach discusses the "false or theological essence of religion," i.e., the view of God as having a separate existence from man. He argues that from this view arises various mistaken beliefs, such as the belief in revelation, which for him not only destroys the moral feeling of religion but also "the divinest feeling in man, the sense of truth." Another example is the belief in sacraments, e.g., the Lord's Supper, which for Feuerbach is 'religious materialism' of which the necessary consequences are "superstition and immorality."

== Influence ==
The book is often considered a classic of humanism and the author's magnum opus. Karl Marx and Friedrich Engels were strongly influenced by the book, although they criticised Feuerbach for his inconsistent espousal of materialism. Feuerbach's theory of alienation would later be used by Marx in his theory of alienation.

A caustic criticism of Feuerbach was delivered in 1844 by Max Stirner in his book Der Einzige und sein Eigentum (The Ego and Its Own). Stirner attacked Feuerbach as inconsistent in his atheism by using Feuerbach's own idea of God as a human abstraction.

== Editions ==
German

- (1841) First. Das Wesen des Christenthums. Leipzig: Otto Wigand.
- (1843) Second. Das Wesen des Christenthums. Leipzig: Otto Wigand.
- (1848) Second. Das Wesen des Christenthums. Leipzig: Otto Wigand. Google (NYPL)
- (1849) Third. Ludwig Feuerbach's sämmtliche Werke. Volume 7. Leipzig: Otto Wigand. Google (Oxford)
- (1883) Fourth. Das Wesen des Christentums. Leipzig: Otto Wigand.

English (translated by Mary Ann Evans, as "George Eliot")

- (1854) First. The Essence of Christianity. London: John Chapman. IA (St. Mary's)
- (1881) Second. The Essence of Christianity. London: Trübner & Co. Google (Oxford)
- (1893) Third. The Essence of Christianity. London: Kegan Paul, Trench, Trübner & Co.; New York: Harper & Row (Harper Torchbooks). Google (Pennsylvania State University).

French (translated by Joseph Roy)

- (1864) Essence du Christianisme. Paris: Librairie Internationale. Google (Ghent)

== See also ==
- Ludwig Andreas Feuerbach
- Marx's theory of alienation
