= I Like Girls =

- J'aime les filles
- Directed by: Diane Obomsawin
- Written by: Diane Obomsawin
- Produced by: Marc Bertrand
- Edited by: Augustin Rioux
- Music by: Judith Gruber-Stitzer
- Production company: National Film Board of Canada
- Release date: November 25, 2016 (Cinematheque Quebec)
- Running time: 8 minutes
- Country: Canada
- Language: French

I Like Girls (French: J'aime les filles) is a Canadian short animated film, directed by Diane Obomsawin and released in 2016. Based on Obomsawin's 2014 graphic novel On Loving Women, the film features anthropomorphic animal characters acting out stories of lesbian same-sex attraction. The animation technique was Rotoscoping.

The film won the prize for Best Short Film at the Ottawa International Animation Festival in 2016. It was a Canadian Screen Award nominee for Best Animated Short Film at the 5th Canadian Screen Awards, and a nominee for Best Animated Short film at the 19th Quebec Cinema Awards. It was submitted to the 2018 Academy Awards for the Academy Award for Best Animated Short Film, but was not selected as a finalist.
