= Kaspar (film) =

2012 Canadian short film directed by Diane Obomsawin

- Directed by: Diane Obomsawin
- Written by: Diane Obomsawin; Kathleen Fee
- Produced by: Marc Bertrand
- Starring: Mathew Mackay; Gabriel Lessard
- Edited by: Augustin Rioux
- Music by: Judith Gruber-Stitzer
- Animation by: Diane Obomsawin
- Production company: National Film Board of Canada
- Release date: March 15, 2012 (IFFA)
- Running time: 13 minutes
- Country: Canada
- Languages: English; French

Kaspar is a Canadian animated short film, directed by Diane Obomsawin and released in 2012. Adapted from her own short comic of the same name, the film recounts the story of Kaspar Hauser.

The film was released in both English and French versions, with Mathew Mackay narrating as Hauser in English, and Gabriel Lessard narrating in French. The voice cast also included Kathleen Fee, Arthur Holden, Marcel Jeannin and Pier Paquette as background voices.

The film was named to the Toronto International Film Festival's annual Canada's Top Ten list for 2012, and was a Jutra Award nominee for Best Animated Short Film at the 15th Jutra Awards in 2013.
