= Diane Obomsawin =

Canadian author, illustrator and animated filmmaker

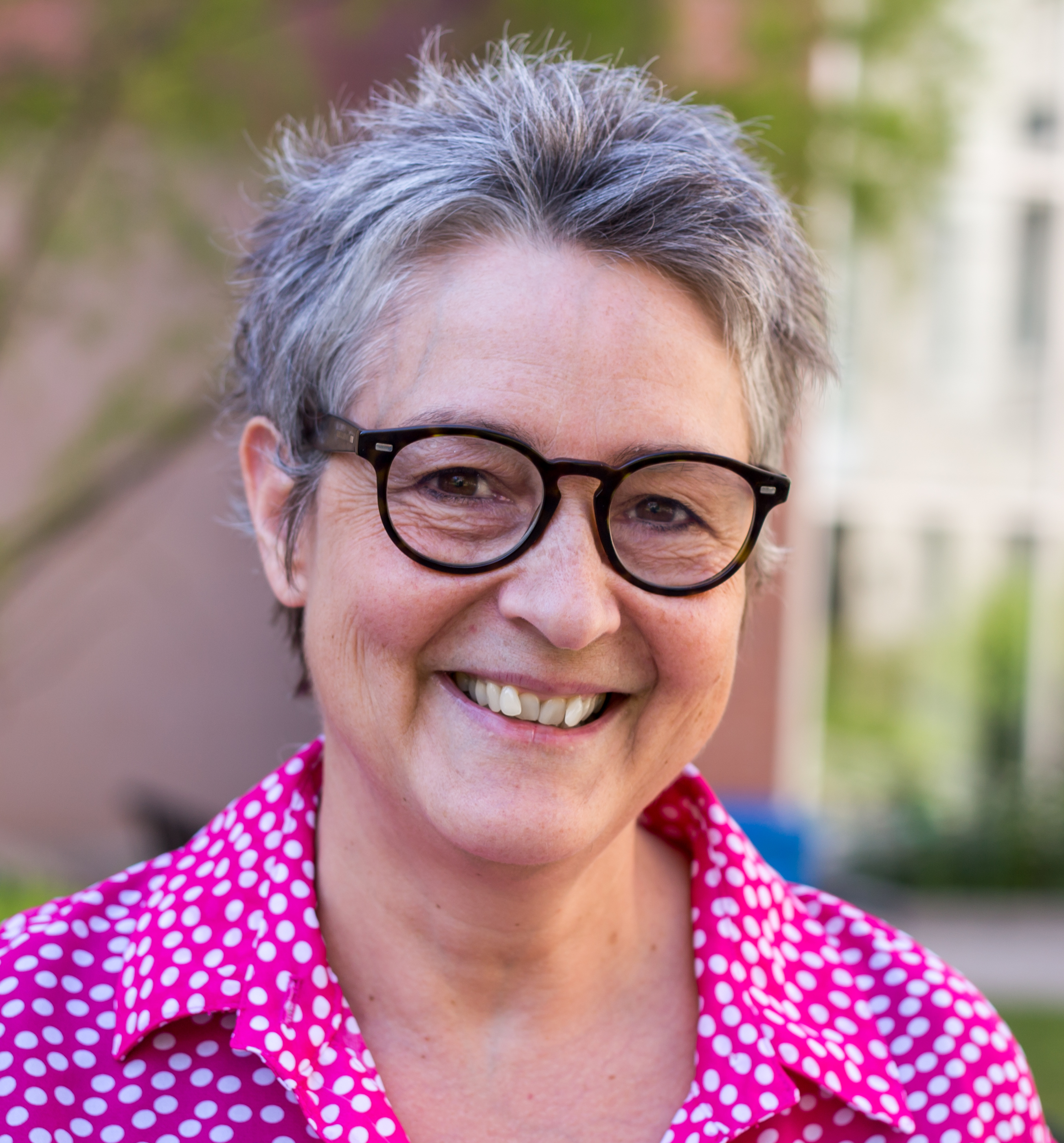
- Obomsawin in 2018
- Born: Diane Obomsawin; 1959 (age 66–67); Quebec, Canada
- Occupations: Author, illustrator, filmmaker
- Writing career
- Genres: Lesbian love, graphic novel, animated film

Diane Obomsawin (born 1959) is an Abenaki Quebec-based author, illustrator and animated filmmaker, often known by her pseudonym, Obom. Some of her notable works have explored the issue of lesbian first love, including a 2014 graphic novel, published in French as J'aime les filles by L'Oie de Cravan and in English as On Loving Women by Drawn & Quarterly. J'aime les filles was adapted as a 2016 National Film Board of Canada animated short, I Like Girls (J'aime les filles), which received the Nelvana Grand Prize for Independent Short at the 40th Ottawa International Animation Festival.

== Comic books ==
Obomsawin's works has been described as complex contemporary comics that often have emotionally charged subjects depicted in clear and accessible manner. An example is Kaspar (2007), which is based on the story of Kaspar Hauser, a German boy raised without human contact. This story, which had previously inspired a film by Werner Herzog, was noted for its different portrait of Hauser as a kind of forsaken everyman, a metaphor for the romantic artist and outsider with the protagonist's depiction that focused on Hauser's naive befuddlement with the world.

On Loving Women, which was translated into English by Helge Dascher, tackles biography (and autobiography) through a series of vignettes that explore memories — crucial moments in the subject's discovery of their sexual identity. A review noted that this material features a “stripped-down approach” that “allows for a focus on the events.”

The author also published the following comic books:

- À chier, volume 2 numéro 2, Iceberg, autumn 1991.
- Greta et Poutine, La Paryse, 1995.
- Plus tard, L'Oie de Cravan, 1997.
- (Sans titre) in Cyclope, t.2 : L’enfance du cyclope, Zone convective, 2002.
- Pink mimi drink, L'Oie de Cravan, 2010.
- À chier, reprint of 1991, Colosse, 2011.
- J’aime les filles, L'Oie de Cravan, 2014.
- On Loving Women, Drawn and Quarterly, 2014.
- À chier, La Mauvaise Tête, 2016.
- Les nuits agitées, La Mauvaise Tête, 2017.

== Films ==
One of Obomsawin's notable films is I Like Girls (2012). This film, which was produced by the National Film Board of Canada and based on J’aime les filles and On Loving Women, follows four women who "reveal the nitty-gritty about their first loves, sharing funny and intimate tales of one-sided infatuation, mutual attraction, erotic moments, and fumbling attempts at sexual expression.” The film was screened at the London Short Film Festival, the L.A. Film Festival, the New Hampshire Film Festival, the St. John's International Women's Film Festival, the Yorkton Film Festival, the Sundance Film Festival, and other venues. The National Film Board of Canada, in a collaborative initiative with Canadian cartoonists, also adapted another of Obomsawin's graphic novels, Kaspar, which was released as an animated short.

- Understanding the Law: The Coat, National Film Board of Canada, 1999.
- Understanding the Law: The Worm, National Film Board of Canada, 1999.
- Elbow Room, National Film Board of Canada, 2002.
- Here and There, National Film Board of Canada, 2006.
- Vistas: Walk-in-the-Forest, National Film Board of Canada, 2009.
- Kaspar, National Film Board of Canada, 2012.
- I Like Girls (J'aime les filles), National Film Board of Canada, 2016.

== Exhibition ==
Obomsawin's first solo exhibition, The Worlds, took place in 2014 at the Centre de Saint-Hyacinthe in Saint-Hyacinthe, Quebec. The exhibition was described as taking viewers “on a journey through stories that form a narrative path into Obomsawin’s imagination.” Obomsawin also illustrated the iconic Molson Brewery building smoking a cigarette in a 2017 exhibition involving magazine Le Montréaler.

== Honors and awards ==
The film “I Like Girls” won the prize for Best Short Film at the Ottawa International Animation Festival in 2016 and was nominated for Best Animated Short Film at the 5th Canadian Screen Awards. It was also nominated for the Prix Iris for Best Animated Short film in 2017.
