= Nänie =

Choral composition by Johannes Brahms

- Choral composition by Johannes Brahms
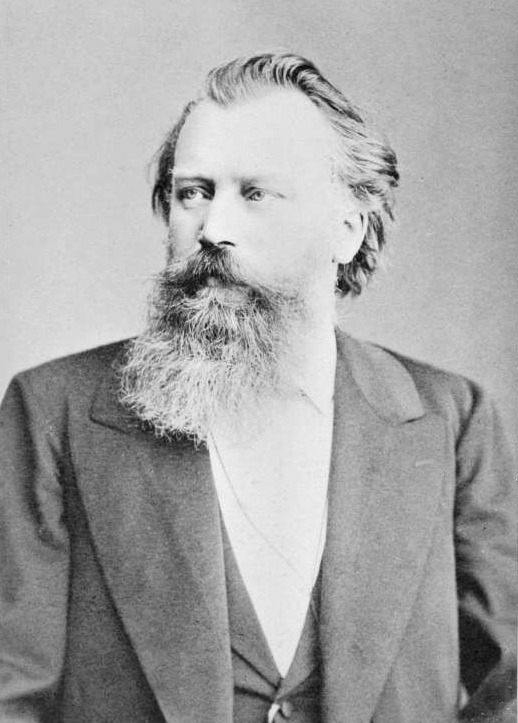
- The composer in 1887
- Opus: 82
- Text: "Nänie" by Friedrich Schiller
- Language: German
- Composed: 1881
- Dedication: To Henriette Feuerbach, in memory of Anselm Feuerbach
- Performed: 6 December 1881, Zürich
- Movements: 1
- Scoring: SATB chorus and orchestra

Nänie (the German form of Latin naenia, meaning "a funeral song" named after the Roman goddess Nenia) is a composition for SATB chorus and orchestra, Op. 82 by Johannes Brahms, which sets to music the poem "Nänie" by Friedrich Schiller. Brahms composed the piece in 1881, in memory of his deceased friend Anselm Feuerbach. It was first performed by the Tonhalle Gesellschaft Chorus Zürich on 6 December 1881, conducted by Brahms. Nänie is a lamentation on the inevitability of death; the first sentence, "Auch das Schöne muß sterben", translates to "Even beauty must die". Typical duration of a performance is approximately 15 minutes.

== Poem ==
Schiller's lament is not for a specific person but the death of the abstract "beautiful" ("Das Schöne"). Schiller mentions three episodes from Greek mythology, but again mostly without names, assuming that the reader with knowledge will make the connections. The first episode refers to Orpheus who tries to rescue Eurydice from the underworld, the second refers to Aphrodite's mourning of her lover Adonis, the third refers to the failed effort of Thetis to save her son Achilles from death.

Auch das Schöne muß sterben! Das Menschen und Götter bezwinget,
Nicht die eherne Brust rührt es des stygischen Zeus.
Einmal nur erweichte die Liebe den Schattenbeherrscher,
Und an der Schwelle noch, streng, rief er zurück sein Geschenk.
Nicht stillt Aphrodite dem schönen Knaben die Wunde,
Die in den zierlichen Leib grausam der Eber geritzt.
Nicht errettet den göttlichen Held die unsterbliche Mutter,
Wann er, am skäischen Tor fallend, sein Schicksal erfüllt.
Aber sie steigt aus dem Meer mit allen Töchtern des Nereus,
Und die Klage hebt an um den verherrlichten Sohn.
Siehe! Da weinen die Götter, es weinen die Göttinnen alle,
Daß das Schöne vergeht, daß das Vollkommene stirbt.
Auch ein Klaglied zu sein im Mund der Geliebten, ist herrlich;
Denn das Gemeine geht klanglos zum Orkus hinab.

Even beauty must die! That which subjugates gods and men
Moves not the steely heart of the Stygian Zeus.
Only once did love come to soften the Lord of the Shadows,
And just at the threshold he sternly took back his gift.
Neither can Aphrodite heal the wounds of the beautiful youth
That the boar had savagely torn in his delicate body.
Nor can the deathless mother rescue the divine hero
When, at the Scaean gate now falling, he fulfills his fate.
But she ascends from the sea with all the daughters of Nereus,
And she raises a plaint here for her glorious son.
Behold! The gods weep, all the goddesses weep,
That the beautiful perishes, that the most perfect passes away.
But a lament on the lips of loved ones is glorious,
For the ignoble goes down to Orcus in silence.

== Setting by Brahms ==
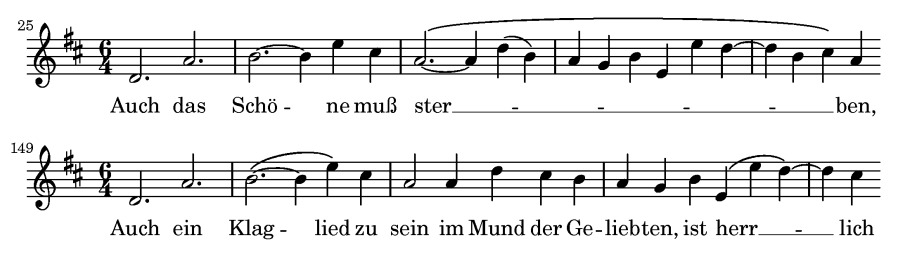
Theme of the beginning, and use later

Brahms began his composition in spring 1880 as a response to the death of his friend, the painter Anselm Feuerbach. He chose the text referring to the frequent motifs from Greek mythology in the painter's work. Brahms completed the composition in the summer of 1881 and dedicated it to Henriette Feuerbach, the painter's stepmother. Written about a decade after Ein deutsches Requiem, it shows a similar approach of consolation of those who mourn a death.

== Other compositions ==
Hermann Goetz also set the text to music in 1874 as Nenie, Op. 10.
