= Henriette Feuerbach =

German author (1812–1882)

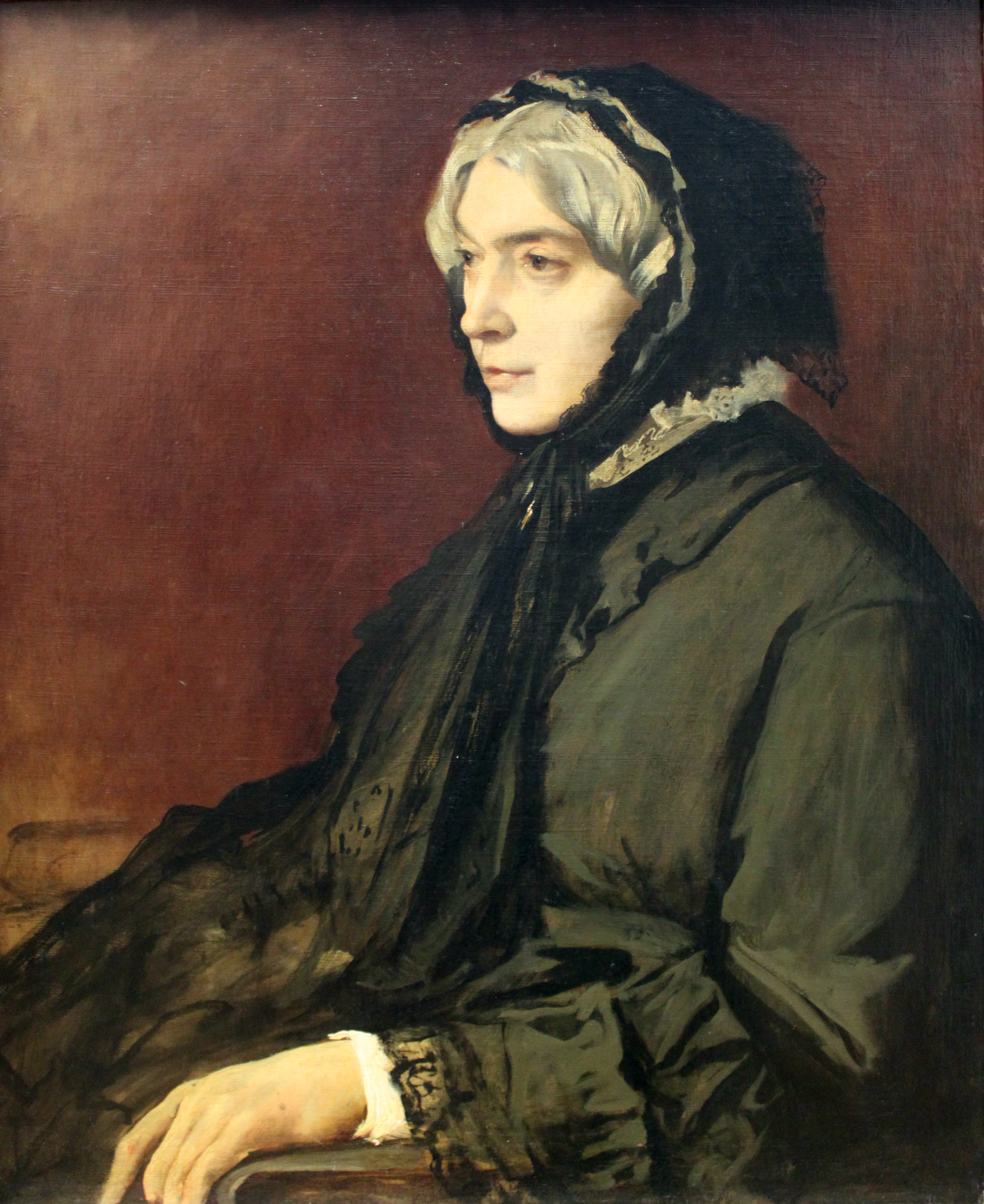
- After an 1877 portrait by Anselm Feuerbach. National Gallery Berlin
- Born: Henriette Heydenreich; 13 August 1812; Ermetzhofen
- Died: 5 August 1892 (aged 79); Freiburg
- Occupations: Author; Patron of the Art
- Relatives: Anselm Feuerbach (stepson)

Henriette Feuerbach (13 August 1812 – 5 August 1892) was a German author and arts patron. She was the wife of Joseph Anselm Feuerbach and the stepmother of painter Anselm Feuerbach, whom she supported in his art.

== Life ==
Born Henriette Heydenreich in Ermetzhofen, she was the third child and only daughter of the pastor Johann Alexander Heydenreich (1754–1814) and his wife Friederika Christine née Freudel. Her brothers were Friedrich Wilhelm Heidenreich, to become a physician, and Christian Heydenreich (1800–1865), a future judge. They grew up in Ansbach and were educated in Latin, Greek and music.

She married on 13 April 1834 the widower Josef Anselm Feuerbach, whose first wife was Amalie Keerl (1805–1830). She lived with him and his two children, Emilie (1827–1873) and Anselm (1829–1880), first in Freiburg im Breisgau, later in Heidelberg. She gave piano lessons, directed a choir, and organised house concerts. Clara Schumann and Johannes Brahms were among those who frequented her salon. Brahms and Henriette held each other in high esteem; in one of Brahms' letters, he referred to her and Anselm as "this splendid woman and her illustrious son". After Anselm's death, Brahms composed Nänie (1881) in his memory and included a dedication to Henriette.

She invested most of her energies into supporting her stepson's efforts to establish himself as an artist and, after his death in 1880, to perpetuate his legacy. After he died, she reportedly destroyed all his personal letters and published a collection of his writings "which show him purely as an artist, as a genius wrestling with himself, his work and ignorant patrons", in an effort to build a legacy for him. This indeed furthered his renown for the next few decades.

She died in Freiburg, eight days short of her 80th birthday.

== Writing ==
In 1839, she published anonymously Gedanken über die Liebenswürdigkeit von Frauen, subtitled as Kleiner Beitrag zur weiblichen Charakteristik (A little contribution to the characteristics of women). In 1845, she published Sonntagsmuße (Sunday Rest), announced as a book for women. She edited with Hermann Hettner a collection of the writings of her husband after his death, working on the first of four volumes. In 1866, she published Uz und Cronegk, the portraits of two Franconian poets of the 18th century. She also published reviews in newspapers and magazines.

Her letters, edited by Hermann Uhde-Bernays, document over a period of 50 years her influence on the education and development of Anselm Feuerbach. She published in 1882 a book Ein Vermächtnis – Anselm Feuerbach (A Legacy), to promote his recognition after his death in 1880. It was successful and has been in print in 50 editions.

== Publications ==
- Gedanken über die Liebenswürdigkeit der Frauen. Campe Verlag, Nürnberg 1839.
- Sonntagsmuße – ein Buch für Frauen. Campe Verlag, Nürnberg 1846.
- Feuerbach, J. A. v., Nachgelassene Schriften in four volumes, Verlag Vieweg und Sohn, Braunschweig 1853
  - Vol. 1: Anselm Feuerbach's Leben, Briefe und Gedichte, ed. Henriette Feuerbach,
  - Volumes 2–4: Geschichte der griechischen Plastik und Kunstgeschichtliche Abhandlungen, ed. Hermann Hettner.
- Uz und Cronegk. Zwei fränkische Dichter aus dem vorigen Jahrhundert., Engelmann Verlag, Leipzig 1866.
- Henriette Feuerbach (ed.): Ein Vermächtnis – Anselm Feuerbach; Propyläen-Verlag, Berlin 1924

== Literature ==
- Herbert Eulenberg: Henriette Feuerbach – Ein Kranz auf ihr Grab, in: Die Familie Feuerbach in Bildnissen, (p. 143, Stuttgart 1924.
- Feuerbachhaus Speyer (ed.): Gedanken über die Liebenswürdigkeit der Frauen. after the original of 1839, Zechnersche Buchdruckerei, Speyer 1974.
- Daniel Kupper: Anselm Feuerbachs „Vermächtnis“. Die originalen Aufzeichnungen. Deutscher Verlag für Kunstwissenschaft, Berlin 1992
- Werner Schuffenhauer (ed.): Ludwig Feuerbach. Gesammelte Werke, Bd. 21, Briefwechsel V (1862–1868). Nachträge (1828–1861), Akademieverlag, Berlin 2004.
- Ilona Scheidle: "Ins Leben hineingeplumpst“. Die Briefeschreiberin Henriette Feuerbach (1812–1892). In: Heidelbergerinnen, die Geschichte schrieben. München 2006, (p. 63–75).
