= Ludwig Feuerbach =

German philosopher and anthropologist (1804–1872)

- Born: Ludwig Andreas von Feuerbach; 28 July 1804; Landshut, Electorate of Bavaria
- Died: 13 September 1872 (aged 68); Rechenberg near Nuremberg, German Empire

Education
- Education: University of Heidelberg; University of Berlin; University of Erlangen (Ph.D. / Dr. phil. habil., 1828)
- Theses: De infinitate, unitate, atque, communitate, rationis (On the Infinitude, Unity, and Universality of Reason) (July 1828); De ratione una, universali, infinita (The One, Universal, and Infinite Reason) (November 1828)
- Academic advisor: G. W. F. Hegel

Philosophical work
- Era: 19th-century philosophy
- Region: Western philosophy
- School: Anthropological materialism Secular humanism Young Hegelians (1820s)
- Institutions: University of Erlangen
- Main interests: Philosophy of religion
- Notable ideas: All theological concepts as the reifications of anthropological concepts

Ludwig Andreas Feuerbach (/ˈfɔɪərbɑːx/ FOIR-bahkh; German: [ˈluːtvɪç ˈfɔʏɐbax]; 28 July 1804 – 13 September 1872) was a German philosopher and anthropologist who was a leading figure among the Young Hegelians. He is best known for his 1841 book The Essence of Christianity, which argued that God is a projection of the essential attributes of humanity. His critique of religion formed the basis for his advocacy of atheism, materialism, and sensualism. His thought served as a critical bridge between the philosophy of Georg Wilhelm Friedrich Hegel and that of Karl Marx.

The son of a distinguished jurist, Feuerbach studied theology at Heidelberg before moving to Berlin to study directly under Hegel. His academic career was cut short in 1830 when his anonymously published first book, Thoughts on Death and Immortality, was condemned as scandalous for its attack on the concept of personal immortality. Barred from university posts, Feuerbach lived and worked in rural isolation for much of his life, in which he produced most of his significant writings supported by his wife's share in a porcelain factory.

Feuerbach's philosophy developed as a critique of Hegel's speculative idealism, which he viewed as the last, most abstract form of theology. He argued that idealism inverted the true relationship between thought and being, and that philosophy's proper subject was not the abstract Absolute, but the concrete, sensuous human being. In The Essence of Christianity, he contended that religion is a form of self-alienation in which humanity projects its own "species-essence"—its unlimited capacity for reason, love, and will—onto a divine being, which it then worships. In his later works, including the Lectures on the Essence of Religion, he developed a "bipolar" theory of religion in which religious belief arises from the human confrontation with nature, driven by the "drive to happiness" and the fear of death.

Feuerbach's thought was a major influence on his contemporaries, particularly Marx and Friedrich Engels. Marx adopted Feuerbach's materialist inversion of Hegel and his theory of alienation, but later criticized him in his Theses on Feuerbach for having a materialism that was too contemplative and for understanding humanity in terms of a static "essence" rather than in terms of concrete social and historical practice (praxis). Feuerbach's work also exerted an influence on the thought of Friedrich Nietzsche and Sigmund Freud.

== Life ==
=== Early life and education ===
Ludwig Andreas Feuerbach was born on 28 July 1804 in Landshut, Bavaria, to Paul Johann Anselm Ritter von Feuerbach, a noted jurist, and Eva Wilhelmine von Feuerbach (née Tröltsch). The family environment was enlightened and liberal; Ludwig was one of five sons who each achieved a measure of distinction. His brothers included the archaeologist Joseph Anselm Feuerbach, the mathematician Karl Wilhelm Feuerbach, and the philologist Friedrich Feuerbach.

Feuerbach began his studies in Protestant theology at the University of Heidelberg in 1823, where he attended lectures by the rationalist theologian H.E.G. Paulus and the speculative theologian Karl Daub. Feuerbach was quickly repelled by the lectures of Paulus, finding them empty, but appreciated the speculative treatment of religion offered by Daub, which interested him in philosophy. He became increasingly drawn to the Hegelian-influenced theology of Daub. The appeal of Berlin grew, and in 1825, after overcoming his father's objections, he matriculated in the faculty of philosophy at the University of Berlin to study directly under Hegel. He also attended the lectures of the theologians Friedrich Schleiermacher and Philip Marheineke. After two years studying under Hegel, Feuerbach gave up theology completely for philosophy.

After a year, financial difficulties forced him to leave Berlin for the University of Erlangen. At Erlangen, he continued his studies in philosophy and planned to study the natural sciences, attending lectures in physiology and anatomy. In 1828, he earned his doctoral degree with a dissertation titled De ratione una, universali, infinita (The One, Universal, and Infinite Reason).

=== Academic career and writing ===
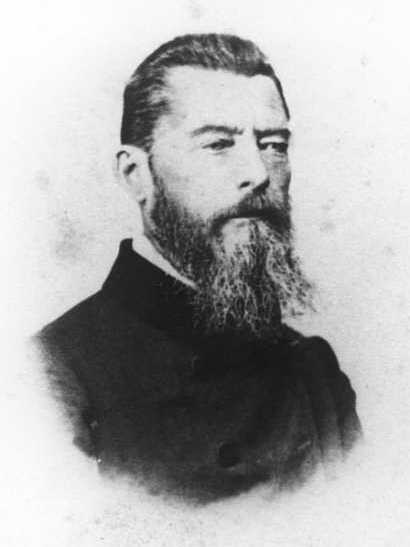
Ludwig Feuerbach

From 1829 to 1835, Feuerbach worked as a docent (lecturer) at the University of Erlangen, where he lectured on the history of modern philosophy. His academic career, however, was doomed after the anonymous publication of his first book, Gedanken über Tod und Unsterblichkeit (Thoughts on Death and Immortality) in 1830. The work was an incisive attack on the concept and theology of personal immortality. It was considered a dangerous and revolutionary document in the reactionary political climate of the time. His authorship was soon discovered, barring him permanently from university posts and any hopes of a literary career. He thereafter turned to philosophical work.

During these difficult years, Feuerbach met and married Bertha Löw in 1837; she was part-owner of a family porcelain factory in Bruckberg. He moved there with her and lived in rustic isolation for many years, supported by her share in the factory. He produced most of his important work during this period, including a series of major works on the history of philosophy such as Geschichte der neuern Philosophie von Bacon von Verulam bis Benedict Spinoza (History of Modern Philosophy from Bacon to Spinoza, 1833), a volume on Gottfried Wilhelm Leibniz (1837), and another on Pierre Bayle (1838).

In 1839, he published Zur Kritik der Hegelschen Philosophie (Critique of Hegelian Philosophy), marking his open break with Hegelian idealism. This was followed in 1841 by his most famous and fundamental work, The Essence of Christianity. During this period of the early 1840s, Feuerbach became the theoretical leader of the Young Hegelians, exercising a profound influence on Karl Marx and Friedrich Engels. It was of this time that Engels would later write, "We were all Feuerbachians." Marx, however, soon developed his own critique of Feuerbach's limitations, sketching his Theses on Feuerbach in 1845, which marked his break with Feuerbachian materialism and anthropologism.

Feuerbach maintained a skeptical and passive attitude toward the Revolution of 1848, though he was lionized by the students and radical intellectuals of the time. At their invitation, he gave a series of public lectures at the City Hall in Heidelberg from December 1848 to March 1849. These were published in 1851 as the Lectures on the Essence of Religion.

=== Later years and death ===
After the failure of the 1848 revolution and the subsequent reactionary period, Feuerbach was in despair over the state of political and intellectual freedom in Germany. He considered migrating to the United States, where he had a circle of admirers in St. Louis and New York City. His next major work was the Theogonie (1857), in which he extended the program of The Essence of Christianity to Greek and Roman mythology.

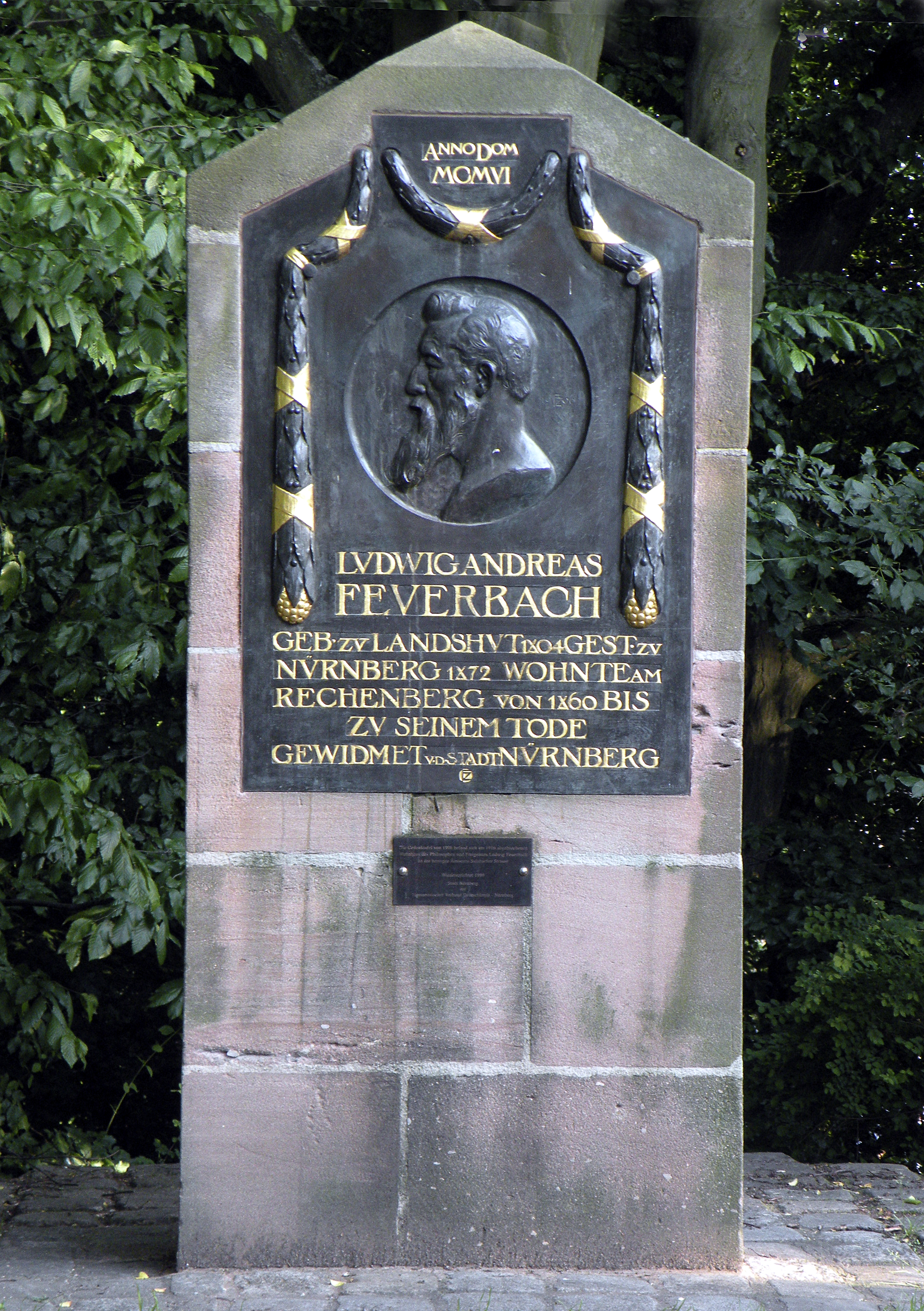
Monument to Feuerbach in Nuremberg

In 1860, his wife's porcelain factory went bankrupt, and at the age of fifty-six, Feuerbach found himself again without a source of income. He moved to Rechenberg, near Nuremberg, where he lived until his death. His final major work was "Spiritualism and Materialism" (1866). In 1868, he read Marx's Capital with enthusiasm, and in 1870, he joined the German Social Democratic Party. Two years later, on 13 September 1872, Feuerbach died and was buried at the Johannisfriedhof in Nuremberg.

== Philosophy ==
Feuerbach's philosophy represents a transition between Hegel and Marx and is a critique of speculative idealism. He did not reject the dialectical method of Hegel but inverted its idealist foundations, substituting the anthropological and materialist for the idealist. According to Feuerbach, traditional philosophy, especially the speculative idealism of Hegel, is a form of esoteric theology that abstracts human characteristics and projects them onto a divine or metaphysical being. His project was to "rehumanize" philosophy by revealing that its true subject is not God or the Absolute, but living, concrete human beings. His critique of religion was not merely destructive; rather, he viewed himself as a "friend and not an enemy of religion" who sought to uncover the "liberating truth" hidden within its "mystified form". For Feuerbach, the task was to transform theology into anthropology, thereby preserving the human values that he believed were at the core of Christianity.

=== Early Hegelianism ===
Feuerbach's 1828 doctoral dissertation, De ratione una, universali, infinita (The One, Universal, and Infinite Reason), was a work of orthodox Hegelianism that exalted the self-sufficiency of reason. In it, he explored the Hegelian dialectic of consciousness, particularly the relationship between the individual self (I) and the other (Thou). He argued that the essence of humanity is Reason, understood as a universal and infinite "species-essence". The individual, through the act of thinking, transcends their finite individuality and achieves a species-identity with others. This recognition of the self in the other is not merely a relationship between two individuals but a realization of one's participation in the universal essence of humanity. The only point on which he diverged from Hegel was in his belief that Christianity could not be the perfect religion, as that domain was reserved for "the real idea and existing reason".

In this early phase, Feuerbach maintained a sharp distinction between thinking and sensing. Communication and universality were possible only in the realm of thought, which he characterized as the "being of universality". Sense experience, by contrast, was private, incommunicable, and the mark of finite individuality. The I–Thou relationship was therefore a dialectic within thought, where the self differentiates itself from and then recognizes its identity with the other as a species-I. This early work laid the foundation for his later concepts of species-being and the I–Thou relationship, though he would later ground these not in abstract Reason but in concrete, sensuous existence.

=== Critique of philosophy and religion ===
In a series of historical works written in the 1830s, Feuerbach developed his own philosophical positions through a critique of other philosophers, a method he called "genetic analysis". He reconstructed the history of modern philosophy as a dialectical process in which philosophy gradually emancipates itself from theology. For Feuerbach, this history was the process of philosophy becoming self-conscious, recognizing that its true subject matter is not God or the Absolute but the human being.

Feuerbach's critique of Hegel was multifaceted. He argued that modern philosophy, particularly Hegel's, was merely a continuation of theology by other means. "Whoever does not surrender Hegelian philosophy does not surrender theology," he wrote. For Feuerbach, Hegel's philosophy was the "last refuge" and the "last ambitious attempt" to restore Christianity, which he saw as lost and defeated, through the medium of philosophy. In his 1839 article "Towards a Critique of Hegel's Philosophy", he described Hegel's system as "rational mysticism", criticizing it for eclipsing material reality and advocating a return to nature. The central flaw of Hegelian idealism, he contended, was its abstraction of the human being. In his view, the idealist, starting with the "I think", views the entire world, including nature and other people, as merely the "other side" of his own self, or "alter ego," thus ignoring their independent existence.

This led Feuerbach to argue that philosophy must be grounded not in abstract thought, but in the sensuous, lived experience of the non-philosophizing human being. He famously stated that the "new philosophy" must insert into its main text "that part of man which does not philosophize, which is against philosophy and opposed to abstract thought." This "transformative method," as it came to be known, was the result of a long and profound struggle with German idealism; it involved inverting Hegel's subject-predicate relationship, treating what Hegel had seen as the subject (the Absolute Idea) as a predicate of the true subject (the concrete human being).

=== The Essence of Christianity ===
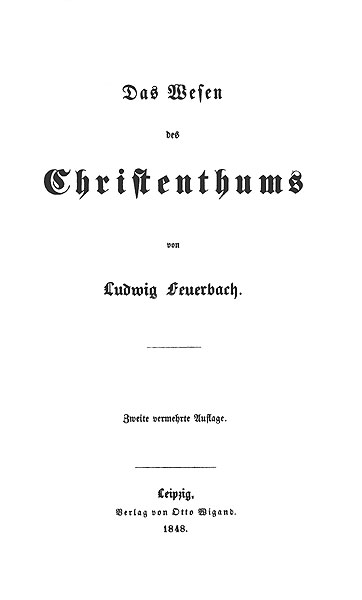
Title page of the second edition of The Essence of Christianity, 1848

Feuerbach's most famous work, The Essence of Christianity (1841), applies his critical method to religion. The book's central thesis is that God is a projection of human nature. Religion, according to Feuerbach, is the "dream of the human mind" in which humanity alienates its own essential qualities—such as reason, love, and will—and projects them onto a divine being, which it then worships as other than itself. He states, "Consciousness of God is man's self-consciousness, knowledge of God is man's self-knowledge. By his God you know the man, and conversely, by the man, you know his God. The two are one." In his own words, the "secret of theology is anthropology."

This process of self-alienation is not a conscious act but the "child-like condition of humanity," the earliest, indirect form of self-consciousness. The real source of religion lies in the dualism within humanity itself: the contradiction between the finite, limited existence of the individual and the infinite, unlimited nature of the human species. Humans project their own "species-essence"—their unlimited capacity for reason, love, and will—as an objective, divine being. God is therefore the objectified essence of humanity. The book has a therapeutic aim, structured in two parts to lead the reader to this self-knowledge. Part I, "The True or Anthropological Essence of Religion," argues that the predicates of God (e.g., wisdom, love, power) are really the perfections of the human species. Part II, "The False or Theological Essence of Religion," argues that when these predicates are believed to belong to a separate, divine being, theological contradictions and negative consequences for humanity necessarily follow.

Feuerbach analyzes Christian doctrines as symbolic expressions of human truths. The Incarnation, for example, represents the religious recognition that the divine is human; it is the "confession of religious atheism to this truth, namely, the reduction of God to Man." The suffering of God in the Passion is the projection of human compassion and the truth that love proves itself through suffering. In his critique, he also highlighted what he saw as the fundamental contradiction in classical theism: the conflict between the abstract, metaphysical attributes of God (such as impassibility, omniscience, and eternity) and his personal, emotional attributes (such as love, compassion, and responsiveness to prayer). The task of the "new philosophy" is to reverse this projection, to re-appropriate the alienated human essence, and to transform the love of God into the love of humanity.

Feuerbach's aim was not to destroy Christianity, but to reclaim its human core as a form of "religious anthropology." He saw his work as a "translation" of the theological essence of religion into its anthropological one. He argued that Protestantism, especially in the thought of Martin Luther, had already initiated this humanization of God by denying Catholic "positivity" and asserting that Christ exists only for humanity, as an object of faith. In Luther's concept of faith, Feuerbach saw a precursor to his own doctrine: "Thus if I believe in a God, I have a God; that is, belief in God is the God of man." Though often considered an atheist tract, Feuerbach himself repudiated the label, arguing that his goal was not to abolish religion but to purify it. The first edition, in particular, was still heavily influenced by Hegel, and the book's closing sentences were so religious in tone that his colleague Arnold Ruge pleaded with him to remove them.

=== Later philosophy ===
In his later works, such as Principles of the Philosophy of the Future (1843) and Lectures on the Essence of Religion (1851), Feuerbach developed his "new philosophy," moving from a critique of religion as self-alienation to a more complex theory grounded in materialism and the human confrontation with nature. These works, especially the 1843 Principles and his Preliminary Theses on the Reform of Philosophy (written 1842), would become the primary source of his influence on Karl Marx.

==== New philosophy of nature ====
Feuerbach's later thought presents a "bipolar model of religion" that replaces the earlier "monopolar" model of The Essence of Christianity. Religion no longer arises solely from the internal projection of human consciousness (the "species-essence"). Instead, it emerges from the interaction between a subjective pole (the human being) and an objective pole (nature). Nature is now seen as the "first, original object of religion," the all-encompassing power upon which humanity is absolutely dependent. God becomes a personification of nature, and the divine attributes are abstractions of nature's powers, such as its omnipresence, eternity, and causal necessity.

This shift was significantly influenced by Feuerbach's intensive study of Martin Luther, which he undertook in the mid-1840s. In Luther's theology, Feuerbach found a "felicity principle" that grounded faith not in abstract speculation but in the concrete human desire for happiness, salvation, and freedom from suffering. This led Feuerbach to re-evaluate the source of religion. The subjective pole of religion was no longer the rational consciousness of the species but the individual's "drive to happiness" (Glückseligkeitstrieb) in the face of natural limitations, particularly the fear of death. Religion becomes a "misinterpretation of nature," an attempt to transform the indifferent forces of nature into a personal, responsive being who can fulfill human desires.

==== Sensualism and "diseased eros" ====
In this later philosophy, Feuerbach develops his "new philosophy," a form of humanist materialism grounded in sensualism. He rejects speculative idealism's starting point of abstract thought and instead posits concrete, sensuous existence as the foundation of all reality and knowledge. "Truth, reality, and sensibility," he writes, "are identical." The beginning of philosophy, he argued in his Theses, is not the abstract absolute but "the finite, the definite, the real."

For Feuerbach, sensibility (Sinnlichkeit) is not merely passive sense perception but the active, lived experience of a dependent being interacting with a real, external world. The senses are not abstract deliverers of data but are "human senses," shaped by human needs, feelings, and culture. He argues that even the most fundamental human functions, like eating and drinking, are religious acts that affirm the material bond between humanity and nature. The unity of mind and body, spirit and nature, is not a metaphysical abstraction but is realized in the concrete, organic life of the individual. This social conception of humanity also had a political dimension. The ultimate for man, Feuerbach argued, is man, and therefore "politics must become our religion." In the state of the future, the fellowship of prayer would be replaced by the fellowship of work, and the bond of the state would be a form of "practical atheism," a recognition that humanity's fate depends not on God but on itself.

Feuerbach's later critique of Christianity became more severe, characterizing it as a "diseased eros" that rejects the body and the sensuous world. He argued that Christian desire for a purely spiritual, otherworldly immortality was a "fantastic, unearthly" wish that represented a rejection of embodied, sensuous existence and a devaluing of life in this world. This later philosophy moves toward a physiological materialism, famously summarized in the pun, Der Mensch ist was er isst ("Man is what he eats"). Here, thinking itself is seen as dependent on the material conditions of the body, and the brain is the organ of thought. However, Feuerbach's materialism is not reductive; he retains the idealist emphasis on the distinctiveness of human consciousness and culture, which he sees as emergent from, but not reducible to, its material and physiological basis.

== Legacy ==
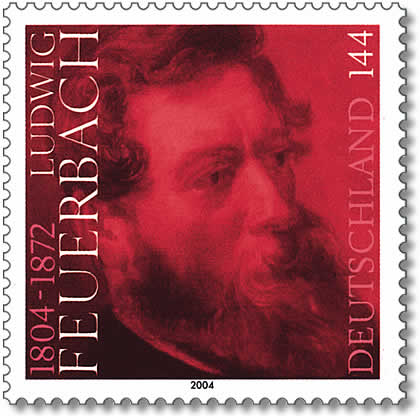
German commemorative postage stamp in honour of Feuerbach's 200th birthday, 2004

Feuerbach's critique of religion and Hegelianism had a profound and immediate impact on his contemporaries. He became the leading figure of the Young Hegelians in the early 1840s. Friedrich Engels later recalled the liberating effect of The Essence of Christianity: "One must himself have experienced the liberating effect of this book to get an idea of it. The enthusiasm was general; we all became at once Feuerbachians." However, this account oversimplifies the book's reception. The general opinion among the Young Hegelians was that Feuerbach's book was a continuation of Hegel's doctrines. Not until the radical movement began to realize its political failure in 1843 did Feuerbach become the predominant influence among them, largely through his later works.

Feuerbach's thought is a critical link in the development from Hegel to Marx. Marx adopted Feuerbach's critique of Hegel's idealism, his reversal of the subject-predicate relationship, and his focus on humanity as the true subject of philosophy and history. The primary influence came not from The Essence of Christianity, but from Feuerbach's Preliminary Theses on the Reform of Philosophy and Principles of the Philosophy of the Future. In his 1844 Paris Manuscripts, Marx lavished praise on these works, writing that "Feuerbach is the only person who has a serious and critical relation to Hegel's dialectic, who has made real discoveries in this field, and above all, who has vanquished the old philosophy." However, Marx criticized Feuerbach in his Theses on Feuerbach for having a materialism that was too abstract and contemplative. Marx argued that Feuerbach understood humanity in terms of a static "species-essence" rather than in terms of concrete, historical social and economic practice (praxis). Despite this critique, Feuerbach's humanist materialism and his theory of alienation remained a foundational influence on the development of historical materialism. Feuerbach's effort to make Hegel's abstract, theological philosophy "tangible and finite," as one commentator put it, "simply became the standpoint of the age," belonging now, consciously or unconsciously, to the intellectual climate of modernity.

Unlike other "masters of suspicion" such as Friedrich Nietzsche or Sigmund Freud, Feuerbach's critique of religion was rooted in a sensitive and scholarly understanding of the Christian tradition itself. He insisted on what has been called "descriptive" fidelity, arguing that an interpreter must first let religion speak for itself, and understand what believers themselves say and feel, before offering an explanation. This approach, particularly in his early work, allowed him to see a "profound, even true" human content within what he considered the "mystified" forms of religious belief.

== Works ==
- De ratione una, universali, infinita (1828) (inaugural dissertation) (digitized by Google from the library of Ghent University).
- Gedanken über Tod und Unsterblichkeit (1830).
- Geschichte der neuern Philosophie von Bacon von Verulam bis Benedict Spinoza. Ansbach: C. Brügel. 1833.
- Abälard und Heloise, Oder Der Schriftsteller und der Mensch (1834).
- Kritik des Anti-Hegels (1835). 2nd edition, 1844. University of Michigan; University of Wisconsin.
- Geschichte der Neuern Philosophie; Darstellung, Entwicklung und Kritik der Leibniz'schen Philosophie (1837). University of Wisconsin.
- Pierre Bayle (1838). University of California.
- Über Philosophie und Christenthum (1839).
- Das Wesen des Christenthums (1841). 2nd edition, 1848 (online).
  - (in English) The Essence of Christianity (1854). Tr. Marian Evans. St. Mary's. 2nd edition, 1881. Oxford.
- Grundsätze der Philosophie der Zukunft (1843). Gallica.
  - (in English) Principles of the Philosophy of the Future (1843). Tr. Zawar Hanfi (1972) marxists.org
- Vorläufige Thesen zur Reform der Philosophie (1843).
- Das Wesen des Glaubens im Sinne Luther's (1844). Harvard.
- Das Wesen der Religion (1846). 2nd edition, 1849. Stanford.
- Erläuterungen und Ergänzungen zum Wesen des Christenthums (1846).
- Ludwig Feuerbach's sämmtliche Werke (1846–1866).
  - Volume 1, 1846. Gallica; NYPL.
  - Volume 2, 1846. Gallica.
  - Volume 3, 1847. Gallica; NYPL. 1876, Oxford.
  - Volume 4, 1847. Gallica; Oxford.
  - Volume 5, 1848. Gallica; NYPL.
  - Volume 6, 1848. Gallica; NYPL.
  - Volume 7, 1849. Gallica; Oxford.
  - Volume 8, 1851. Gallica; NYPL.
  - Volume 9, 1857. Gallica; NYPL.
  - Volume 10, 1866. Gallica; NYPL.
- Ludwig Feuerbach in seinem Briefwechsel und Nachlass (1874). 2 volumes. Oxford. Vol. 1. NYPL. Vol. 2. NYPL.
- Briefwechsel zwischen Ludwig Feuerbach und Christian Kapp (1876). Harvard; Oxford.

== See also ==
- The German Ideology by Karl Marx and Friedrich Engels (1846)
- Ludwig Feuerbach and the End of Classical German Philosophy by Friedrich Engels (1886)
- Philosophical anthropology
