= Karl Wilhelm Feuerbach =

German mathematician (1800–1834)

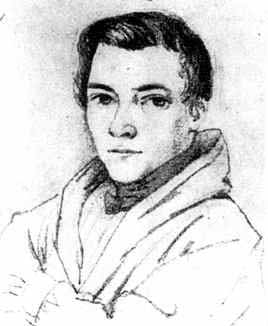
- Born: 30 May 1800; Jena, Saxe-Weimar, Holy Roman Empire
- Died: 12 March 1834 (aged 33); Erlangen, Kingdom of Bavaria
- Education: Albert Ludwigs University of Freiburg
- Known for: Feuerbach's theorem
- Scientific career
- Fields: Mathematician
- Workplaces: University of Basel

Notes
- Brother of Ludwig Andreas Feuerbach

Karl Wilhelm Feuerbach (30 May 1800 – 12 March 1834) was a German geometer and the son of legal scholar Paul Johann Anselm Ritter von Feuerbach, and the brother of philosopher Ludwig Feuerbach. After receiving his doctorate at age 22, he became a professor of mathematics at the Gymnasium at Erlangen. In 1822 he wrote a small book on mathematics noted mainly for a theorem on the nine-point circle, which is now known as Feuerbach's theorem. In 1827 he introduced homogeneous coordinates, independently of Möbius.

== Works ==
- Eigenschaften einiger merkwürdigen Punkte des geradlinigen Dreiecks und mehrerer durch sie bestimmten Linien und Figuren. Eine analytisch-trigonometrische Abhandlung (Monograph ed.), Nürnberg: Wiessner, 1822. online book at Google Books ("Properties of some special points in the plane of a triangle, and various lines and figures determined by these points: an analytic-trigonometric treatment")
- Grundriss zu analytischen Untersuchungen der dreyeckigen Pyramide ("Foundations of the analytic theory of the triangular pyramid")
