= Feuerbach (Neckar) =

River in Germany

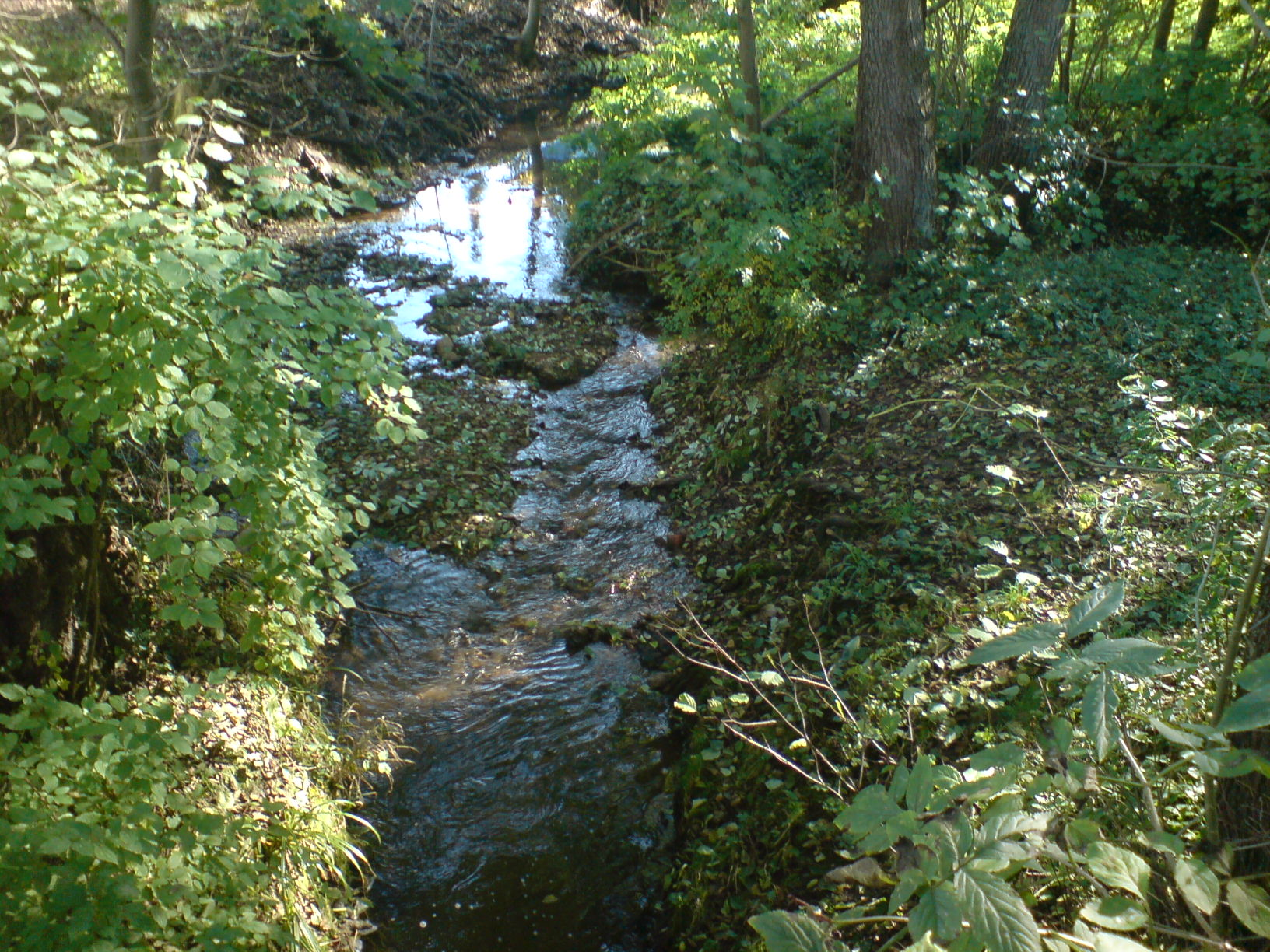

Location
- Country: Germany
- State: Baden-Württemberg

Physical characteristics
- Mouth
  - location: Neckar
  - coordinates: 48.8413°N 9.2326°E
- Length: 15.2 km (9.4 mi)

Basin features
- Progression: Neckar→ Rhine→ North Sea

Feuerbach (German pronunciation: [ˈfɔʏɐbax]; in its upper course: Metzgerbach) is a river of Baden-Württemberg, Germany. It passes northwest of Stuttgart, and flows into the Neckar in the Stadtteil Stuttgart-Mühlhausen.

== See also ==
- List of rivers of Baden-Württemberg
