= Hainichen, Thuringia =

Hainichen
- Municipality
- Location of Hainichen within Saale-Holzland-Kreis district
- Interactive map of Hainichen
- Location within Germany Location within Thuringia
- Coordinates: 51°0′N 11°37′E
- Country: Germany
- State: Thuringia
- District: Saale-Holzland-Kreis
- Municipal assoc.: Dornburg-Camburg

Government
  - Mayor (2022–28): Dennis Graen

Area
  - Total: 5.32 km^{2} (2.05 sq mi)
- Elevation: 327 m (1,073 ft)

Population (2025-12-31)
  - Total: 190
  - Density: 36/km^{2} (92/sq mi)
- Time zone: UTC+01:00 (CET)
  - Summer (DST): UTC+02:00 (CEST)
- Postal codes: 07778
- Dialling codes: 036427
- Vehicle registration: SHK, EIS, SRO
- Website: http://www.mein-hainichen.de

Hainichen (German pronunciation: [ˈhaɪnɪçn̩]) is a municipality in the district Saale-Holzland, in Thuringia, Germany.
