= Paul Johann Anselm Ritter von Feuerbach =

German legal scholar (1775–1833)

Anselm von Feuerbach
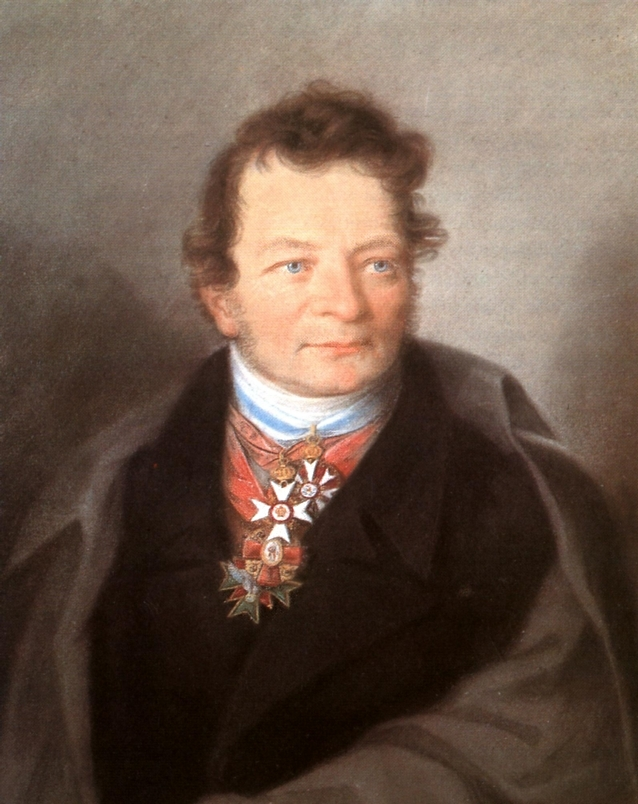
- Born: Paul Johann Anselm Feuerbach; 14 November 1775; Hainichen, Electorate of Saxony, Holy Roman Empire
- Died: 29 May 1833 (aged 57); Free City of Frankfurt, German Confederation
- Occupation: Legal scholar
- Children: 8

Academic work
- Notable works: Reform of the Bavarian penal code

Statue of Anselm von Feuerbach at the Reich Court building in Leipzig

Paul Johann Anselm Ritter von Feuerbach (14 November 1775 – 29 May 1833) was a German legal scholar. His major achievement was a reform of the Bavarian penal code which led to the abolition of torture and became a model for several other countries. He is also well known for his research on Kaspar Hauser, who died the same year as Feuerbach.

== Biography ==
He was born in Hainichen, near Jena. He received his early education at Frankfurt on Main, where his family had moved soon after his birth. At the age of sixteen, however, he ran away from home, and, going to Jena, was helped by relations there to study at the university. In spite of poor health and the most desperate poverty, he made rapid progress. He attended the lectures of Karl Leonhard Reinhold and Gottlieb Hufeland, and soon published some literary essays of more than ordinary merit.

In 1795, he took the degree of doctor of philosophy, and in the same year, though possessing little money, he married. It was this step which led him to success and fame, by forcing him to turn from his favourite studies of philosophy and history to that of law, which was repugnant to him, but which offered a prospect of more rapid advancement.

At 23, he came into prominence by a vigorous criticism of Thomas Hobbes' theory on civil power. Soon afterwards, in lectures on criminal jurisprudence he set forth his famous theory, that in administering justice judges should be strictly limited in their decisions by the penal code. This new doctrine gave rise to a party called Rigorists, who supported his theory. Von Feuerbach was the originator of the famous maxim nullum crimen, nulla poena sine praevia lege poenali: "There is no crime and hence there shall not be punishment if at the time no penal law existed".

In 1801, Feuerbach was appointed extraordinary professor of law without salary, at the University of Jena, and in the following year accepted a chair at Kiel, where he remained two years.

His chief work was the framing of a penal code for Bavaria. In 1804, he had moved from the University of Kiel to the University of Landshut, but, on being commanded by King Maximilian Joseph to draft a penal code for Bavaria (Strafgesetzbuch für das Königreich Bayern), in 1805 he moved to Munich where he was given a high appointment in the Ministry of Justice and was ennobled in 1808. The practical reform of penal legislation in Bavaria was begun under his influence in 1806 by the abolition of torture.

Out of his practical experience in the Ministry of Justice, with evaluating death penalties by Bavarian courts for royal pardon, he published the most notable cases 1808/11 in Merkwürdige Criminalfälle and 1828/29 a much enlarged collection Aktenmäßige Darstellung merkwürdiger Verbrechen (Notable crimes presented according to the court records). With this legal handbook of criminal cases in the tradition of the famous "Causes Célèbres" of the French lawyer François Gayot de Pitaval (1673–1743), Feuerbach intended to establish a modern criminal psychology ("Seelenkunde") for crime investigation, criminal judges, etc.

In the course of time, his work has been misinterpreted merely as a literary collection of fictional sensational crimes, and many of his court cases have been edited and published as trivial popular crime stories. However, Gerold Schmidt has found that Feuerbach recorded true historical events at true localities and persons with their real names and that, therefore, his work is a rich historical source for Bavarian local and social history, mentality, biography, etc.

In his Betrachtungen über das Geschworenengericht of 1811, Feuerbach declared against trial by jury, maintaining that the verdict of a jury was not adequate legal proof of a crime. Much controversy was aroused on the subject, and the author's view was subsequently to some extent modified.

The result of his labours on the Bavarian penal code was promulgated in 1813. The influence of this code, the embodiment of Feuerbach's enlightened views, was immense. It was at once made the basis for new codes in Württemberg and Saxe-Weimar; it was adopted in its entirety in the Grand Duchy of Oldenburg; and it was translated into Swedish by order of the king. Several of the Swiss cantons reformed their codes in conformity with it.

Feuerbach had also undertaken to prepare a civil code for Bavaria, to be founded on the Code Napoléon. This was afterwards set aside, and the Codex Maximilianus adopted as a basis. The project did not become law.

During the war of liberation (1813–1814), Feuerbach showed himself an ardent patriot, and published several political brochures. In 1814, Feuerbach was appointed second president of the court of appeal at Bamberg, and three years later he became first president of the court of appeal at Ansbach. In 1821 he was deputed by the government to visit France, Belgium, and the Rhine provinces for the purpose of investigating their juridical institutions. As the fruit of this visit, he published his treatises Betrachtungen über Öffentlichkeit und Mündigkeit der Gerechtigkeitspflege (1821) and Über die Gerichtsverfassung und das gerichtliche Verfahren Frankreichs (1825). In these he pleaded unconditionally for publicity in all legal proceedings.

In his later years, he took a deep interest in the fate of the strange foundling Kaspar Hauser, who had excited much attention in Europe. He was the first to publish a critical summary of the ascertained facts, under the title Kaspar Hauser, ein Beispiel eines Verbrechens am Seelenleben (1832).

Feuerbach died on 29 May 1833 in Frankfurt. There is some controversy over the cause and circumstances of his death, which remain largely unclear; his family, as well as he himself, shortly before his death, believed that he had been poisoned due to his protection of and research work on Kaspar Hauser, who himself died later the same year under suspicious circumstances.

== Family ==
Feuerbach had five sons and three daughters: Joseph Anselm Feuerbach (1798–1851), Karl Wilhelm Feuerbach (1800–1834), Eduard August Feuerbach (1803–1843), Ludwig Andreas Feuerbach (1804–1872), Heinrich Friedrich Feuerbach (1806–1880), Rebecca Magdalena (1808–1891), Leonore Feuerbach (1809–1885), and Elise Feuerbach (1813–1883).

== Writings ==
- Feuerbach, Paul Johann Anselm, Ritter von: The Wild Child The unsolved mystery of Kaspar Hauser. Translated from the German with an Introduction by Jeffrey Moussaieff Masson/ NY Free Press 1997 1st ppb ptg ISBN 0-684-83096-5
- Paul Johann Anselm von Feuerbach/Gerold Schmidt, "Alltag im Alten Bayern", Norderstedt (Books On Demand GmbH) 2006, 357 pages (with local register and index of names) ISBN 978-3-8334-6060-9

== See also ==
- List of unsolved deaths

== Sources ==
- Chisholm, Hugh, ed. (1911). "Feuerbach, Paul Johann Anselm" . Encyclopædia Britannica (11th ed.). Cambridge University Press.
- Gustav Radbruch Paul Johann Anselm Feuerbach - ein Juristenleben, Springer, Vienna (1934)
