= Joseph Anselm Feuerbach =

German classical philologist and archaeologist

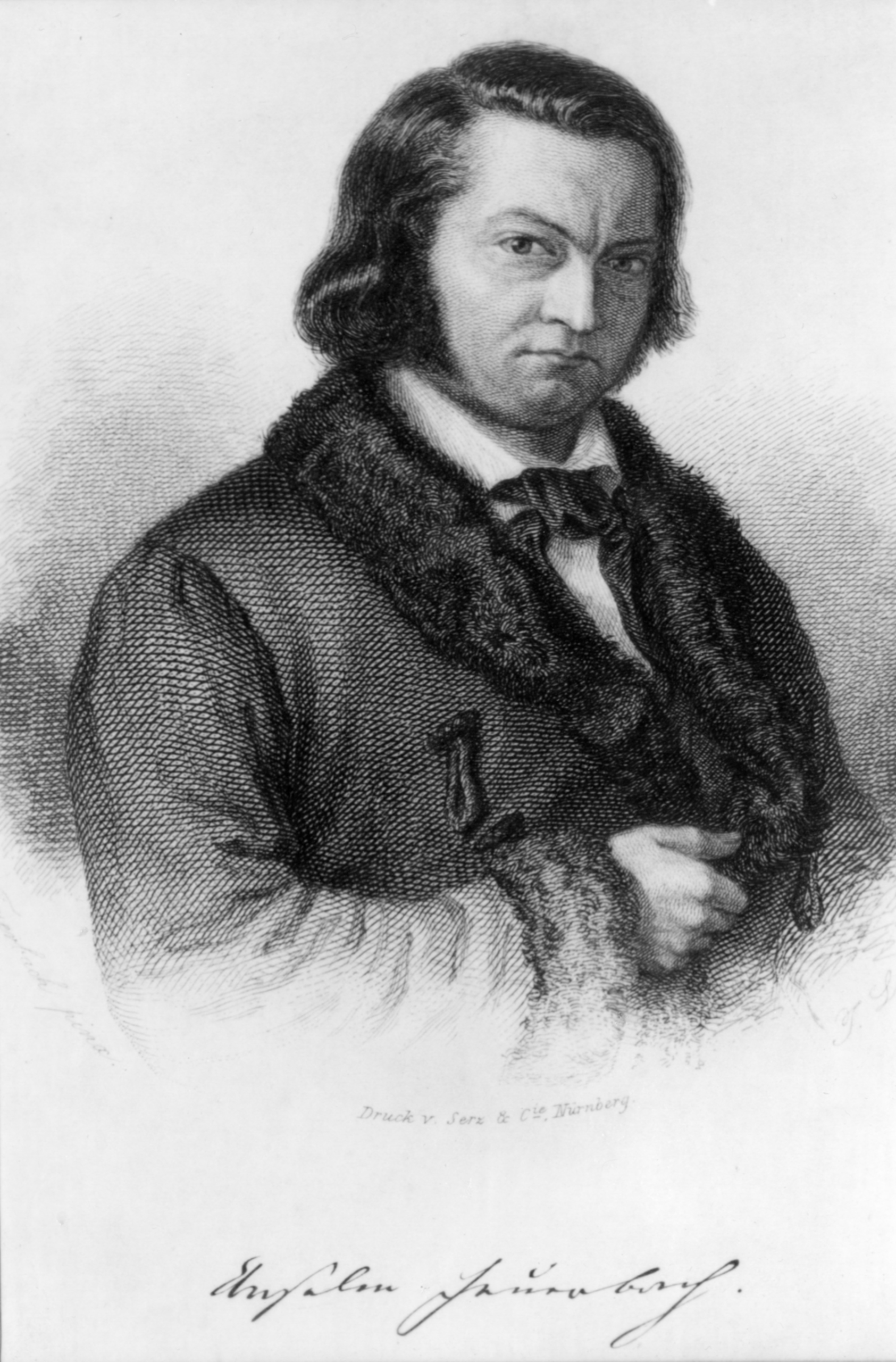
- Joseph Anselm Feuerbach
- Born: 9 September 1798; Jena, Duchy of Saxe-Weimar
- Died: 8 September 1851 (aged 52); Freiburg im Breisgau, Grand Duchy of Baden
- Scientific career
- Fields: philology, antiquities and art history

Joseph Anselm Feuerbach (9 September 1798 – 8 September 1851) was a German classical philologist and archaeologist.

== Biography ==
Born in Jena, he studied history, philosophy and theology at the University of Erlangen from 1817, followed by studies of philology and archaeology at the University of Heidelberg (from 1820). In 1825 he began work as a schoolteacher at the gymnasium in Speyer. In 1836 he was appointed professor of philology, antiquities and art history at the University of Freiburg.

His principal work was an archaeological study of the Vatican Apollo, titled Der vaticanische Apollo. Eine reihe archäologisch-ästhetischer Betrachtungen (1833, second edition 1855). After his death in Freiburg im Breisgau, a collection of his writings were published as Nachgelassene schriften (1853, 4 volumes; edited by Henriette Feuerbach and Hermann Hettner).

== Family ==
He was the eldest son of legal scholar Paul Johann Anselm Ritter von Feuerbach and the father of painter Anselm Feuerbach. His wife from his second marriage, Henriette Feuerbach, was the sister of physician Friedrich Wilhelm Heidenreich.
