= Symposium =

Symposium may refer to:

== Ancient Greece ==
- Symposium (ancient Greece), a social institution
- Symposium (Plato), a dialogue by Plato
- Symposium (Xenophon), a dialogue by Xenophon

== Academia and scholarship ==
- Symposium (conference), an academic gathering concerning a scholarly subject
- Symposium: Canadian Journal of Continental Philosophy, an academic journal

== Arts and entertainment ==
- Symposium (band), a British band
- The Symposium (band), an American band
- Symposium (Feuerbach), a pair of 19th-century paintings by Anselm Feuerbach
- Symposium (Gallen-Kallela), a painting by Akseli Gallen-Kallela
- Symposium (novel), a 1990 novel by Muriel Spark
- "Sympozium", a song by Dimmu Borgir from Puritanical Euphoric Misanthropia
