= Remembrance of Tivoli =

Painting by Anselm Feuerbach

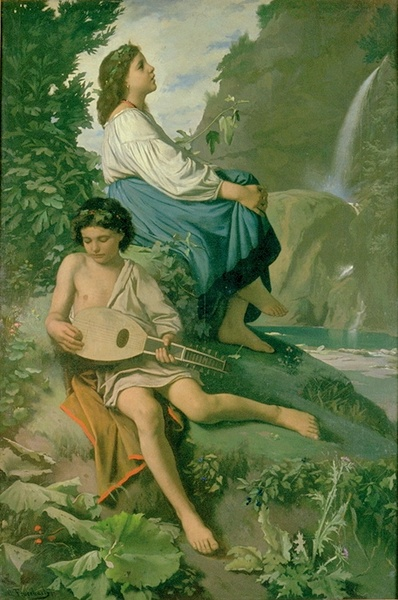
- Artist: Anselm Feuerbach
- Year: 1866
- Medium: oil on canvas
- Dimensions: 194 cm × 131 cm (76 in × 52 in)
- Location: Alte Nationalgalerie, Berlin

Remembrance of Tivoli (Italian - Ricordo di Tivoli) is a painting by the German artist Anselm Feuerbach, produced during his 1866 stay in Rome. It shows two Italian peasant children in Tivoli. It is now in the Alte Nationalgalerie, in Berlin.
