= Conference =

Meeting to discuss or exchange opinions

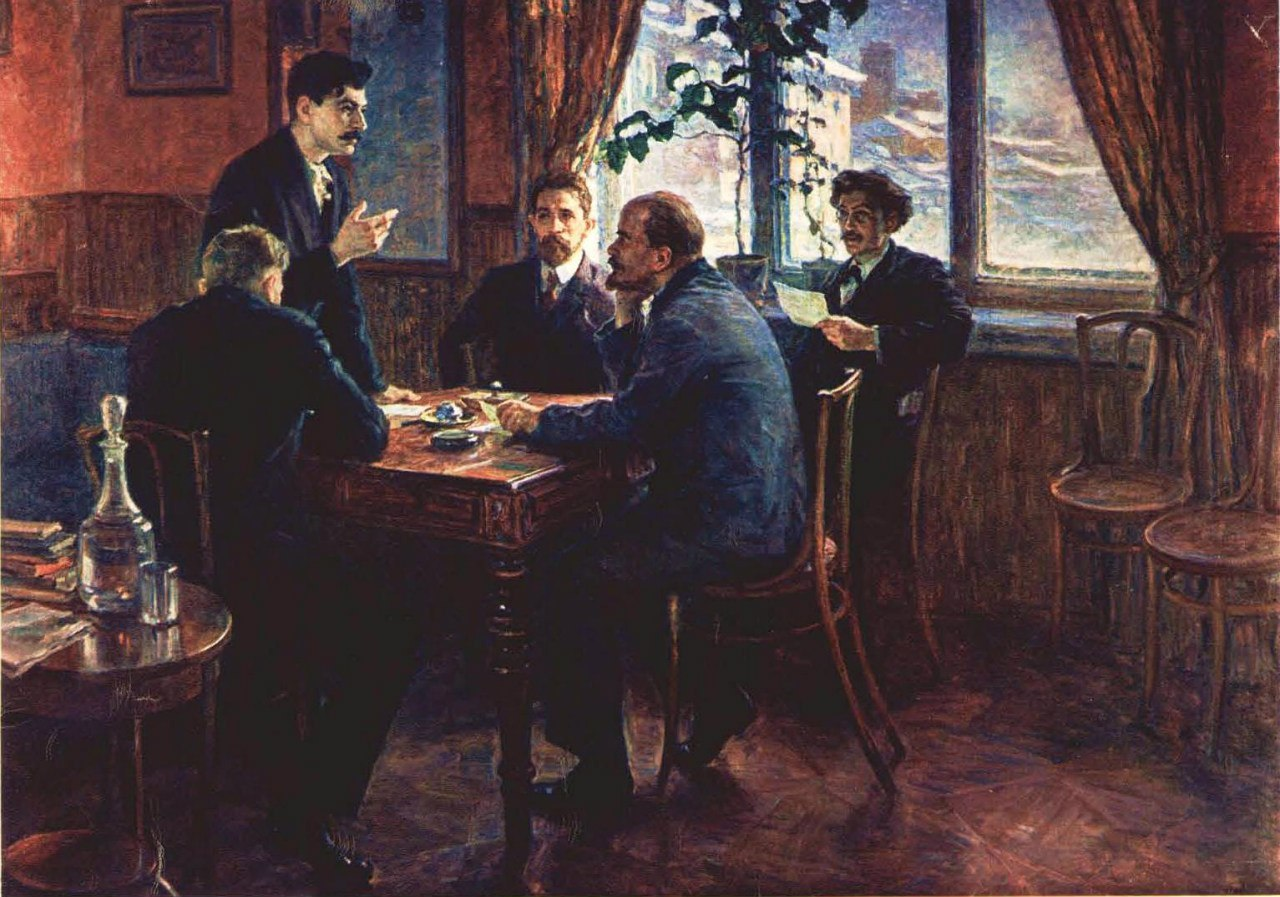
Artist Aleksandr Moravov's "Tampere Conference of 1905", depicting the first conference of the Russian Social Democratic Labour Party in Tampere and notably, the first-time meeting of Joseph Stalin and Vladimir Lenin.

A conference is a meeting, often lasting a few days, which is organized on a particular subject, or to bring together people who have a common interest. Conferences can be used as a form of group decision-making, although discussion, not always decisions, is the primary purpose of conferences. The term derives from the word confer.

== History ==
The first known use of "conference" appears in 1527, meaning "a meeting of two or more persons for discussing matters of common concern". It came from the word confer, which means "to compare views or take counsel". However the idea of a conference far predates the word. Arguably, as long as there have been people, there have been meetings and discussions between people. Evidence of ancient forms of conference can be seen in archaeological ruins of common areas where people would gather to discuss shared interests such as "hunting plans, wartime activities, negotiations for peace or the organisation of tribal celebrations".

Since the 1960s, conferences have become a lucrative sector of the tourism industry and have evolved into hundred billion Pound per year industry on a global scale. The growth around the world, including in Great Britain, Germany, Philippines, United States and Australia, has led to conferences themselves becoming an industry with buyers, suppliers, marketing, branding and conference facilities.

Modern conferences can be held to discuss a variety of topics, from politics, to science or sport. Many conferences are held on a regular periodic basis, such as annually, biannually (twice per year), or biennially (every other year).

With the development of communications technology, conference holders have the choice of replacing the physical meeting space with a telephonic or virtual form of meeting. This has resulted in terms such as a conference call or video conference.

== Conference types ==
Conferences can have various formats, topics and intentions. These formats may include seminars and workshops, which differ in scale, structure, and audience interaction.

=== Conference formats ===
- Conference call, in telecommunications, a call with more than two participants at the same time
- Conference hall, room where conferences are held
- Video conference, with the reception and transmission of audio-video signals by users at different locations

=== Conferences topics ===
- Academic conference, in science and academic, a formal event where researchers present results, workshops, and other activities
- Conferences in Methodism
  - General Conference (Methodism), the highest governing body of a Methodist denomination
  - Annual conferences within Methodism, the governing structure of certain Methodist churches; despite the name, these are not individual events
  - Jurisdictional conferences (Methodism), a grouping of annual conferences
- Athletic conference, a competitive grouping of teams, often geographical
- Authors' conference, or writers' conference, where writers gather to review their written works and suggest improvements
- Parent–teacher conference, a meeting with a child's teacher to discuss grades and school performance
- Peace conference, a diplomatic meeting to end conflict
- Press conference, an announcement to the press (print, radio, television) with the expectation of questions, about the announced matter
- Professional conference, a meeting of professionals in a given subject or profession dealing with related matters or developments
- Settlement conference, a meeting between the plaintiff and the respondent in a lawsuit, wherein they try to settle their dispute without proceeding to trial
- Trade fair, or trade conference
- Unconference or open space conference, a participant-driven meeting that tries to avoid one or more aspects of a conventional conference

== See also ==
- Conference pear, a fruit, a cultivar of European pear
- Conference call, a telephonic meeting
- TED (Technology, Education and Design) Talks and TEDx conferences
- List of Allied World War II conferences
- Summit (meeting)
- Symposium (disambiguation)
- Convention (meeting)
