= Ludwig Deutsch =

Austrian orientalist painter

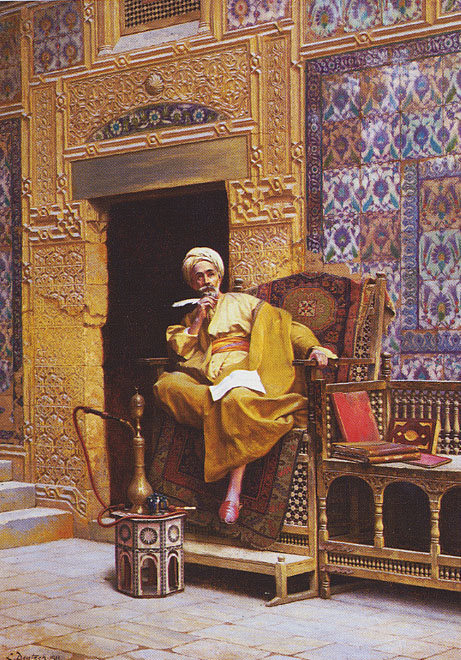
- The Scribe painting by Ludwig Deutsch, 1911
- Born: 13 May 1855; Vienna, Austrian Empire
- Died: 9 April 1935 (aged 79); Paris, France
- Education: Vienna Academy of Fine Arts (1872–1875)
- Known for: Painting
- Movement: Orientalism

Ludwig Deutsch (13 May 1855 – 9 April 1935) was a French painter of Austrian origin, who settled in Paris and became a noted Orientalist artist. Having studied at the Vienna Academy of Fine Arts from 1872 to 1875, he moved to Paris in 1878, where he became associated with other Orientalist painters. Most of his works were painted in his studio in Paris, but he had visited Egypt on several journeys from 1885 to 1898. In 1919, he became a French citizen and started to write his name as Louis Deutsch.

== Life and career ==
Details of Ludwig Deutsch's life are obscure. He was born in Vienna in 1855 into a well-established Jewish family. His father Ignaz Deutsch was a financier at the Austrian court.

He received his early art training at the Akademie der Bildenden Künste (Academy of Fine Arts Vienna) under the tutelage of Anselm Feuerbach (1875–1877). In 1877, when Feuerbach retired as a teacher, Deutsch and some others students attempted to enter the class of Leopold Carl Müller, who had moved to Paris in 1876, but initially were refused entry. In 1878 Deutsch was finally accepted. At around this time, he may also have studied with Jean-Paul Laurens. In Paris, Deutsch made the acquaintance of artists Arthur von Ferraris, Jean Discart and Rudolf Ernst, who became his lifelong friend. Through these friendships, Deutsch developed an interest in Orientalist art.

Around 1880, he broke his contacts with Vienna and settled permanently in Paris. He established a studio at the Rue Le Pelletier in Paris and began to exhibit paintings with much success.

Though his earliest Orientalist subjects appeared in 1881, Deutsch's first documented journeys to the Middle East were made in 1885, 1890, and 1898, when he visited Egypt. Throughout the 1890s, he visited Egypt at least three times. Like many of his contemporaries, he found inspiration in the North African light, colours, scenery and customs. He collected a vast quantity of Oriental objects, including tiles, furniture, arms, pipes, fabrics, and costumes, which he would subsequently use in his paintings.

== Work ==
His early work focused primarily on historical subjects, but after visiting Egypt, he concentrated on Orientalist scenes. He was particularly interested in capturing the rich, opulent scenes of Cairo and its environs. The detail in his paintings is excellent. He was prolific, producing many paintings with the same theme – prayers, guards, musicians, street vendors etc. In order to produce paintings in large volume, he created a very economical approach, using the same settings with different subjects and activities to create an impression of variety.

Many of Ludwig Deutsch's paintings are now in the Shafik Gabr Collection. Amongst his best known works are: The Scribe, painted 6 years after Paul Joanowits did Bashi-Bazouks Before a Gateway but in the same location, and Musical Interlude. Among Austrian Orientalist painters, his works are considered to be some of the most sought after by collectors.

Like many of his contemporaries, including Paul Joanovitch, Rudolf Ernst and Jean-Léon Gérôme, Deutsch made extensive use of photography to ensure archaeological accuracy in his painted renderings of local architectural features (e.g. tiles, ablaq stone work, and the traditional mashrabiyyah woodwork) in what has been described as "documentary realism". Nissan N. Perez, Curator of Photography at the Israel Museum, wrote for example, that "the details in masonry and the angle of view in Deutsch's paintings El Azhar - The Arab University in Cairo (1890) and The Scribe (1904)" are doubtlessly inspired by photographs of Cairo-based photographer Gabriel Lekegian of the same places. This allowed him to use the Orient as inspiration, but to produce most of his paintings in his Paris studio.

Selected paintings

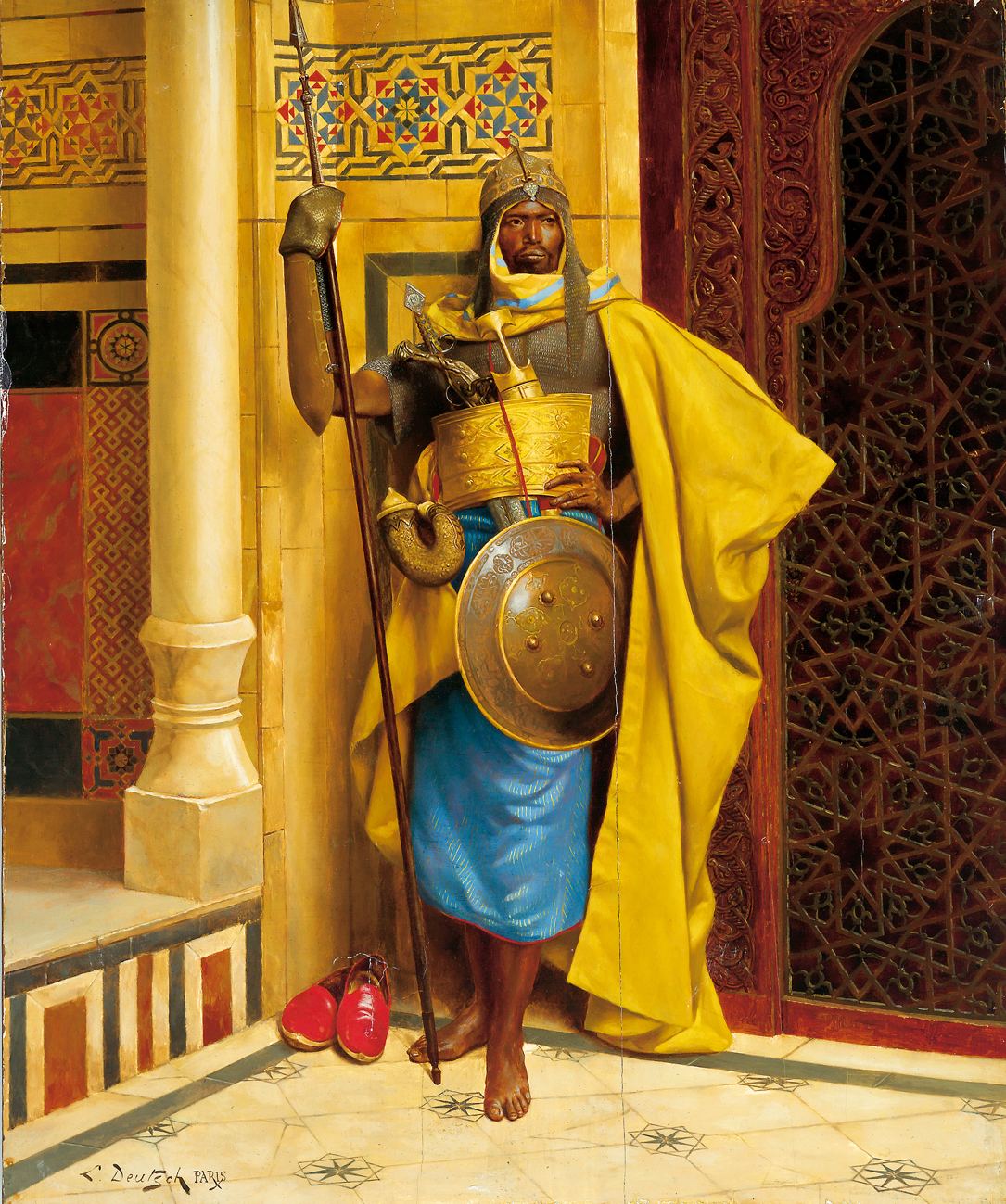
The Nubian Palace Guard, date unknown

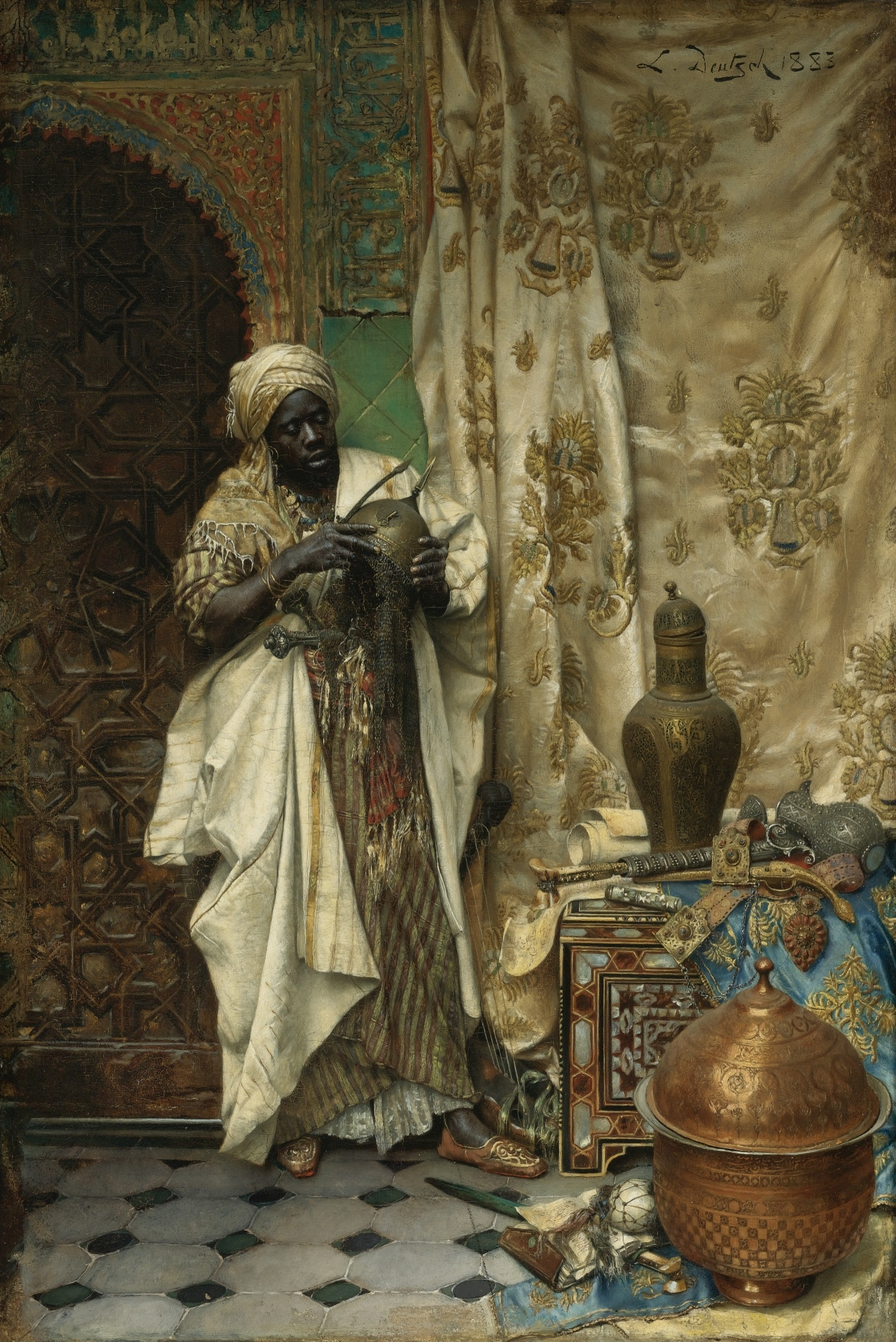
The Inspection, 1883

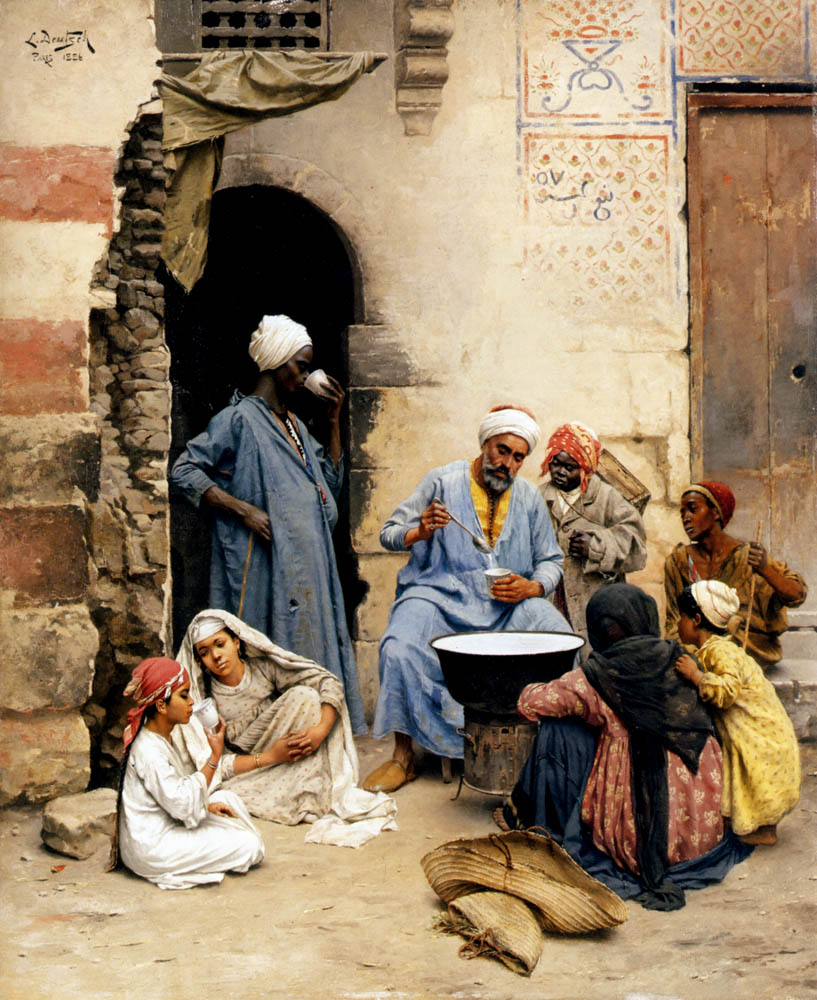
The Sahleb Vendorm, 1886

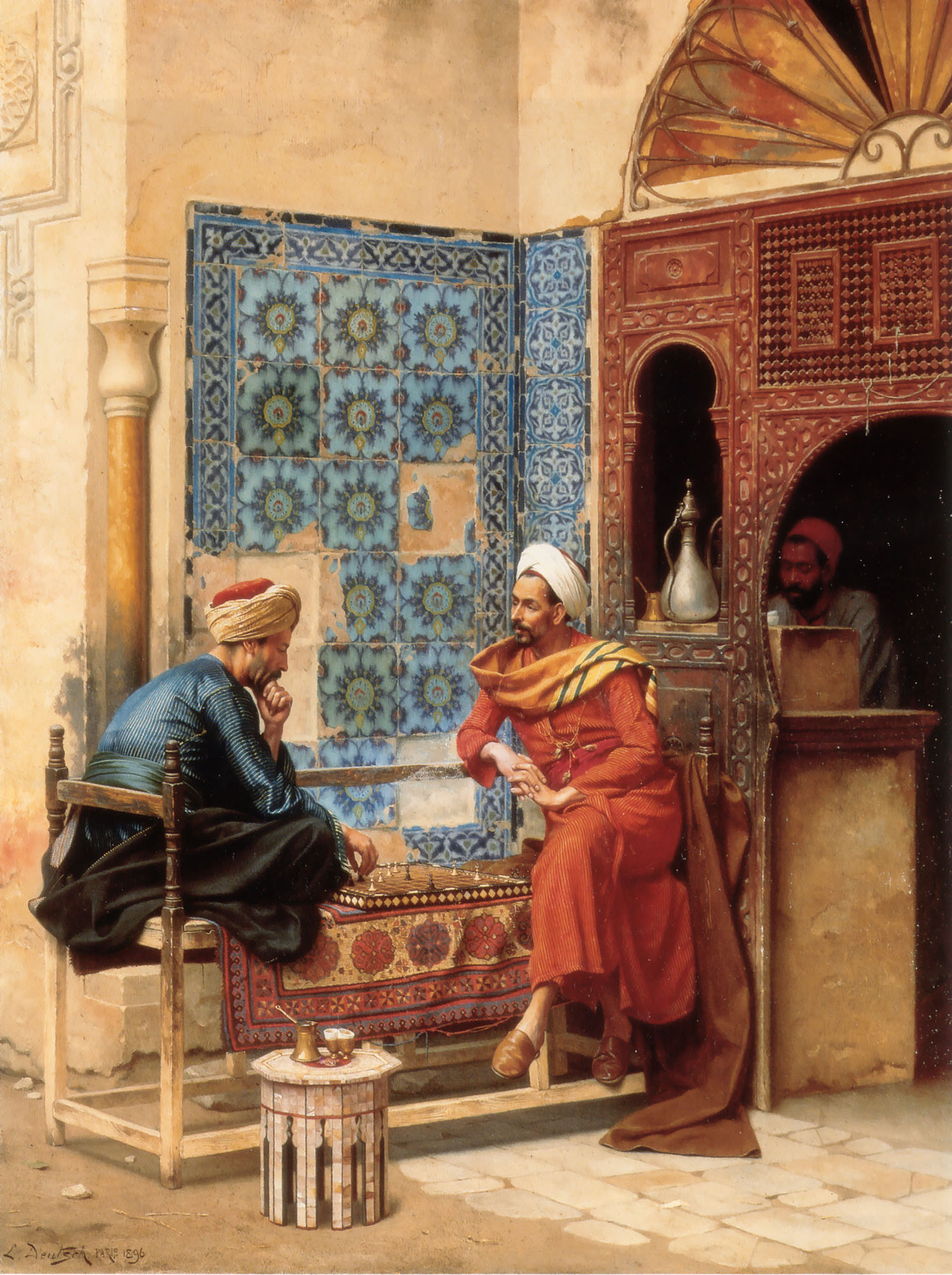
The chess game between Tha'ālibī and Bakhazari, 1896

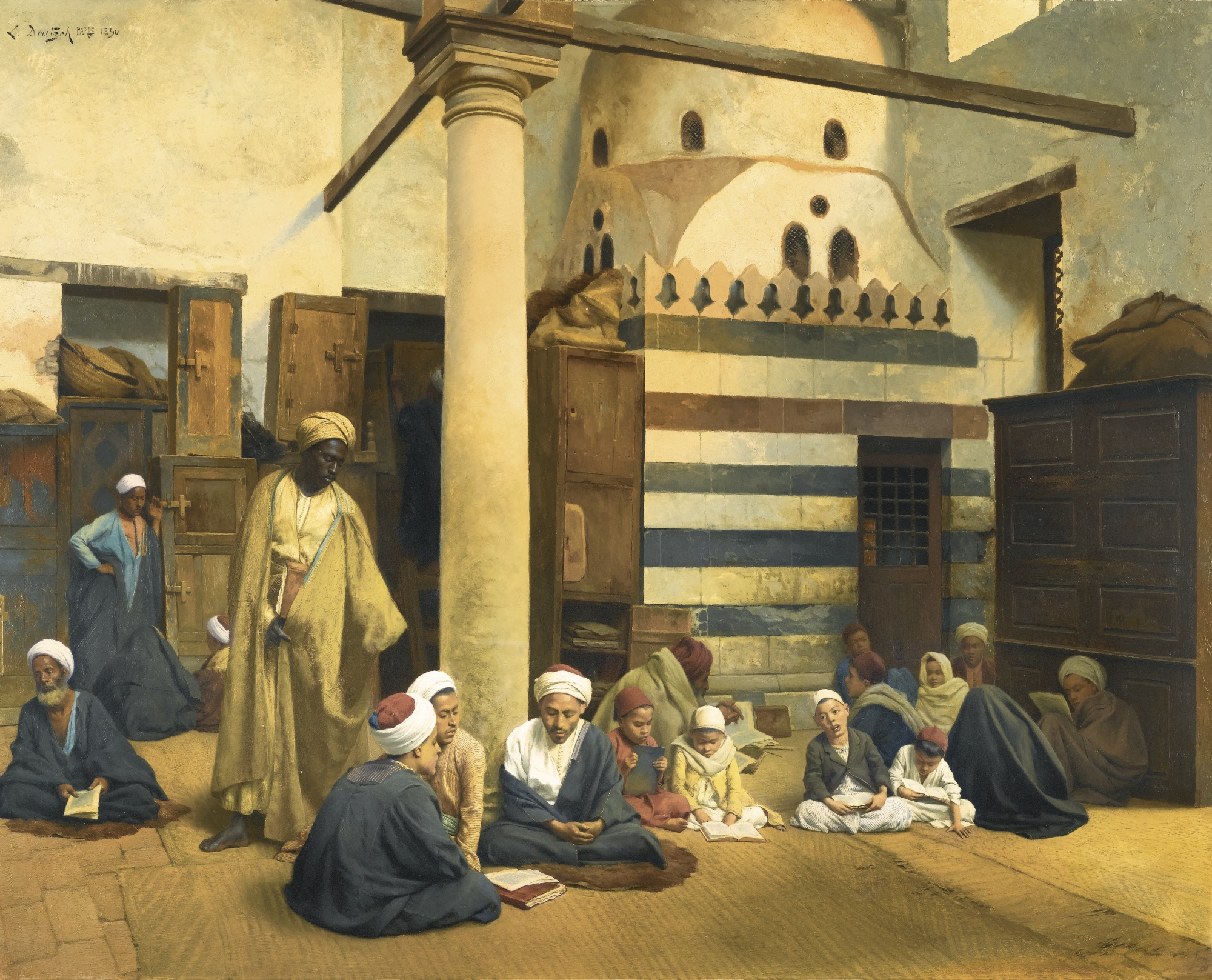
In the Madrasa, c.1900

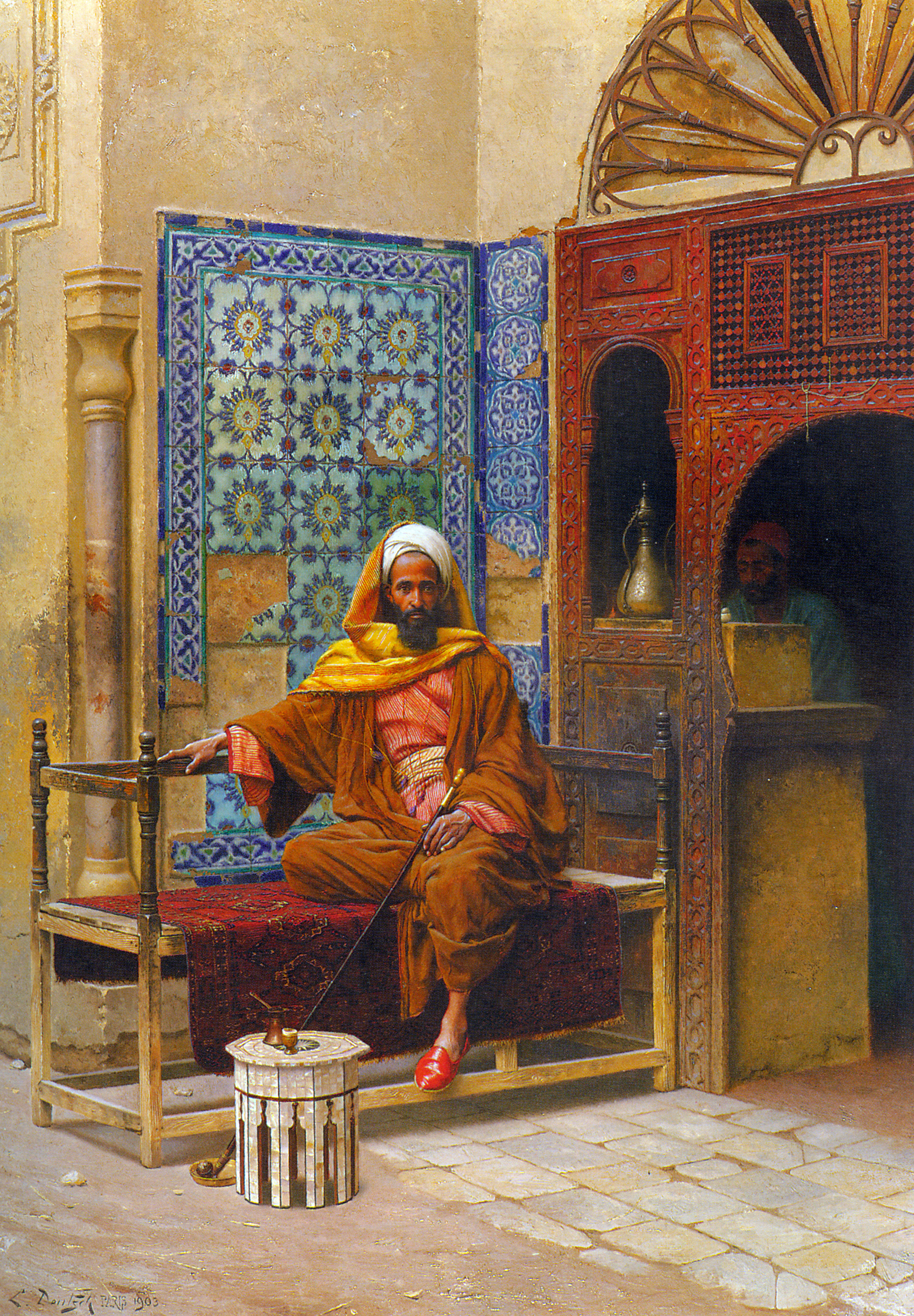
The Smoker, 1903

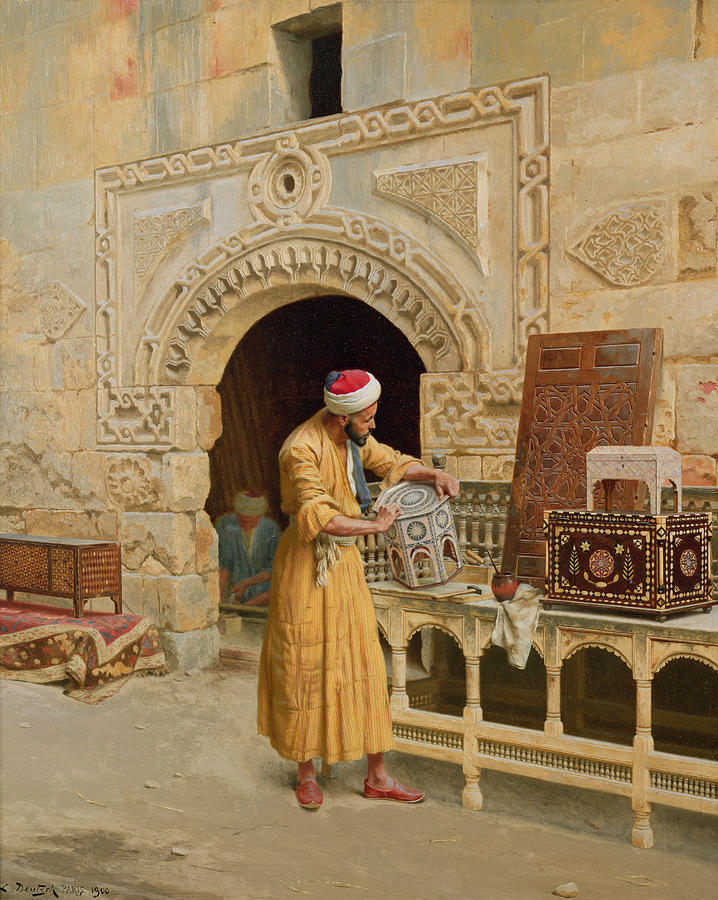
The Furniture Maker, 1900

Select list of paintings

- The Domino Players, 1882
- An Orientalist Amateur, 1883 (Painting exhibited at the Salon of French Artists, and now presumed lost)
- The Musician, 1883
- The Sentinel, 1885
- News from Sudan, 1885
- The Answer, 1886
- The Sherbert Vendor, 1886
- The Hour of Prayer, 1887
- The Snake Charmers, 1888
- Court of El Azhar University, Cairo, 1890
- The Healer, 1891
- The Orange Seller, 1892
- The Palace Guard, 1892
- The Emir's Guard, 1893
- The Scribe, 1894
- The Scholar, 1895
- The Chess Game 1896
- The Philosopher, 1897
- The Offering, 1897
- Prayer at the Tomb, 1898
- Leaving the Mosque, 1900
- The Learned, 1900
- Interior of Mosque, 1902
- The Harem Watchman 1903
- The Koran School, 1905
- Morning Prayer, 1906
- The Narghil Smoker, 1907
- Le Maitre, 1907
- The Procession of the Mahmal through the Streets of Cairo, 1909
- At Prayer, 1911
- The Scribe, 1911
- The Treasure Chest, 1920
- At Prayer, 1923
- The Fortune Teller, 1927
- Musical Interlude, 1932

== See also ==
- List of Orientalist artists
