= Symposium (Gallen-Kallela) =

Painting by Akseli Gallen-Kallela

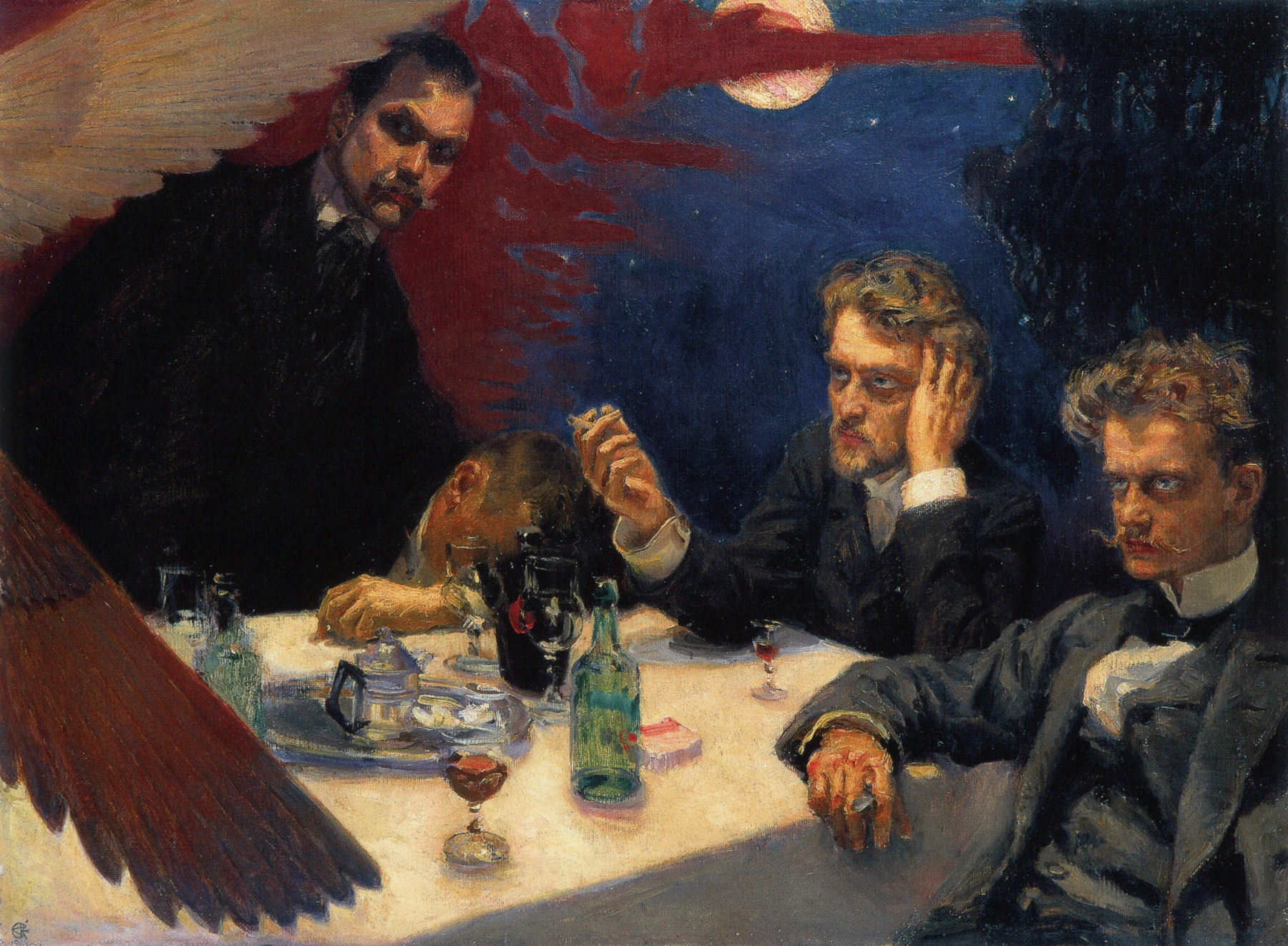
Symposium by Akseli Gallen-Kallela

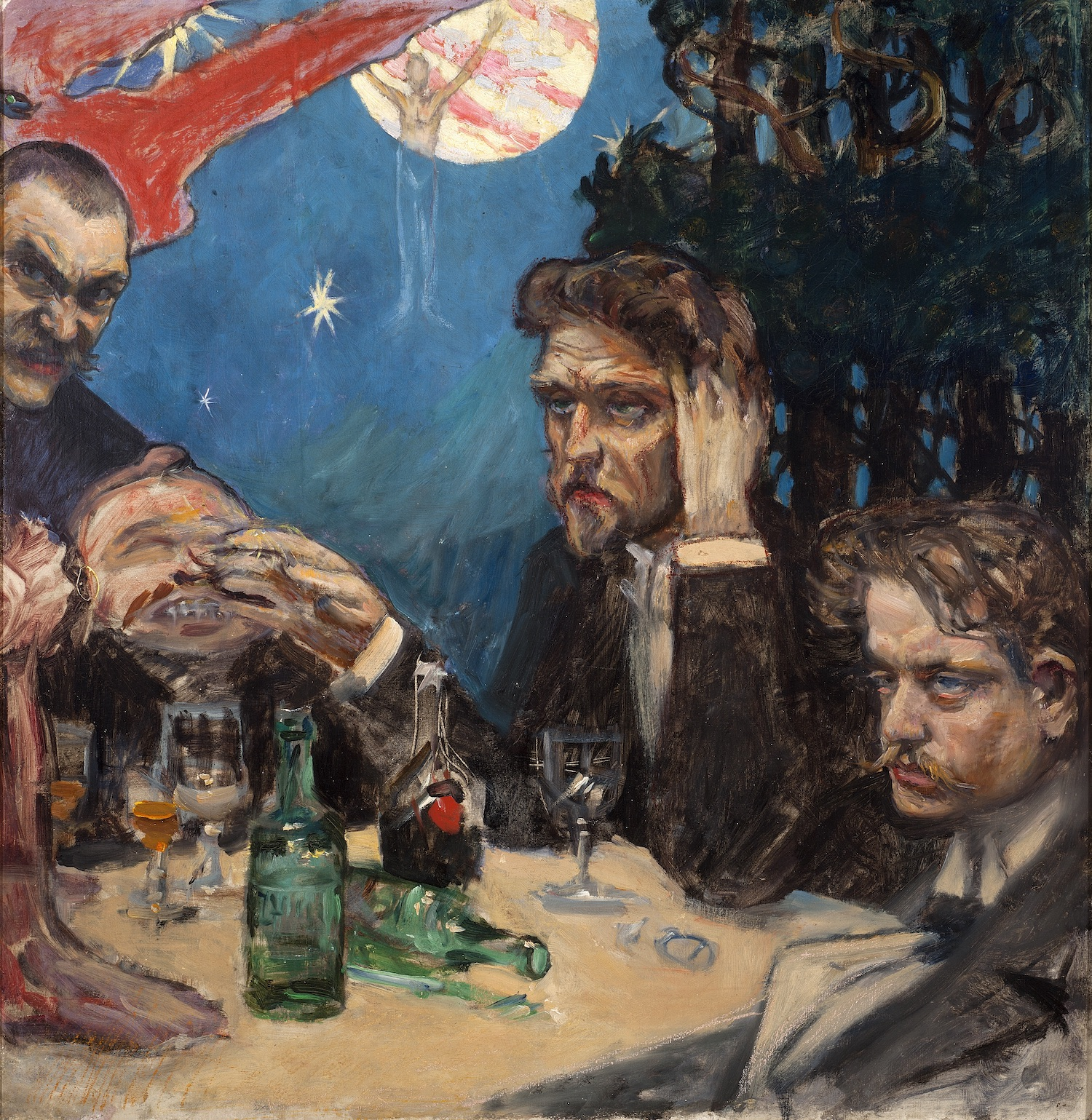
Gallen-Kallela's sketch for the painting

Symposium (also known as Symposion and Problem, Finnish: Probleemi) is an oil painting created by Akseli Gallen-Kallela in 1894.

The pictured gathering party consists of Finnish artists, who regularly had a meeting in the Hotel Kämp in Helsinki, then in the Grand Duchy of Finland. The stylistic direction of the painting was the first example of a Symbolist style by Gallen-Kallela. The finished version is in a private collection, while the sketch is owned by the Gösta Serlachius Fine Arts Foundation.

The term symposium derives from Greek, meaning a party of men with discussions.

The intended title during the working phase of the paintwork was Kajustaflan. Dual versions of the painting were created, the draft along with the final version.

The gentlemen on the caricature picture were then and still are well known Finnish intellectuals: from left the painter Akseli Gallen-Kallela himself, at that time Axel Gallén, composers Oskar Merikanto plus Jean Sibelius with Robert Cajanus who was the principal conductor of an orchestra.

They were members of a wide artistic circle of poets, writers, and other cultural individuals at the time.

== Reception ==
After the painting became exhibited most of the Finnish audience and critics did not approve of it and the artist suffered public disapproval. The rest of the Symposium circle were also criticised for leading questionable lives. The reputation of alcoholism followed especially Sibelius.

Gallen-Kallela himself thought that the Symposium was a "bomb" whose "fragments will, of course, eventually fall on my own neck, but I think I can handle it".

== The Symposium circle ==
The gentlemen in the painting belonged to a community of artists formed in the winter of 1892, called the Symposion circle.

The leading figurehead of the society was Kajanus, who was a decade older than the others, and in addition to him, Gallen-Kallela and Sibelius were prime members. The external members of the district also included other artists, musicians and writers.

In the conversations of circle, a renaissance of Finnish spiritual life starting from the north was sought, after Gallen-Kallela, new strength to replace the decadent decadence.

Public criticism eventually led to the dissolution of the Symposion circle, which did not meet again after 1895.
