= Jean Baptiste Discart =

Italian-French orientalist painter (1855–1940)

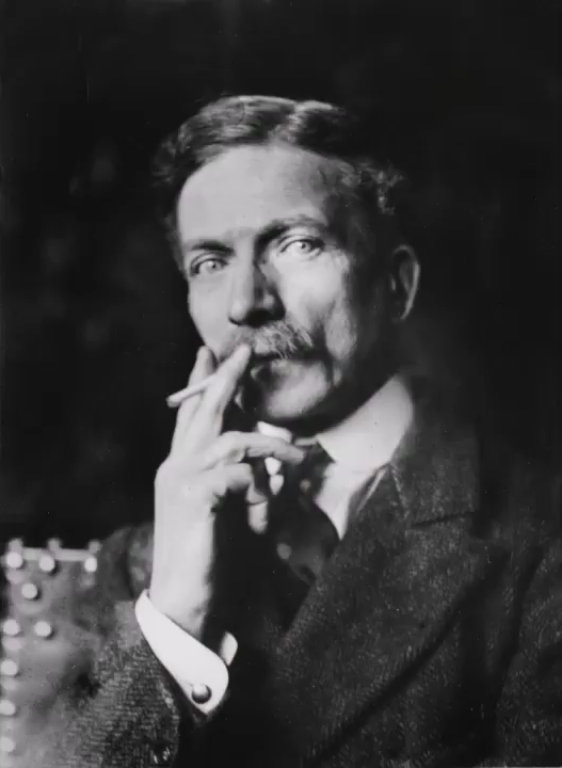
Jean Discart (date unknown)

Jean Baptiste Discart (5 October 1856, Modena – 1 January 1940, Paris) was an Italian-born painter; known primarily for his portraits and Orientalist scenes. He worked mainly in France and the Netherlands, and came to be identified as French.

== Biography ==
His father, Francesco Ferdinando Discart (1819–1893), worked at the court of Francis V, Duke of Modena. After graduating from the gymnasium, in 1869, he enrolled at the Academy of Fine Arts Vienna, aged only fourteen. He would study there almost continuously until 1880. His primary professors were Leopold Karl Müller and Anselm Feuerbach, who had the most influence on his style. He refused to continue his studies after Feuerbach's death.

Around 1880/81, he settled in Paris, joining some of his fellow students from the Vienna Academy. It was there that he first developed an interest in Orientalism, and most likely created his first works in that genre in Tangiers. He later visited Morocco, and may have been to other parts of North Africa, although this is not well-documented. His visits there continued through 1920. Unlike many other Orientalists, his works were focused on daily life and its minutiae, rather than cityscapes, landscapes and harems. Most are very detailed. He probably created some paintings from photographs.

From around 1895, he painted portraits in the Netherlands. His subjects mostly came from noble families, such as the Van Lyndens, the Van Limburg-Stirums, the Van Tuylls, the Van Heemstras and the Van Heeckerens. In 1909, he created a large portrait of King Albert I of Belgium, on the occasion of his ascension to the throne. His last known portraits, pastels of the Van Lyndens, were made in 1929. Most of them are in private collections. Discart is generally associated with the Austrian Orientalist school. His training at the Academy of Fine Arts Vienna, particularly under Anselm Feuerbach and Leopold Carl Müller, strongly influenced his later Orientalist work. His fellow Vienna students Ludwig Deutsch and Rudolf Ernst likewise became prominent Orientalist painters.

He died at his home in Paris in 1940.

== Selected paintings ==
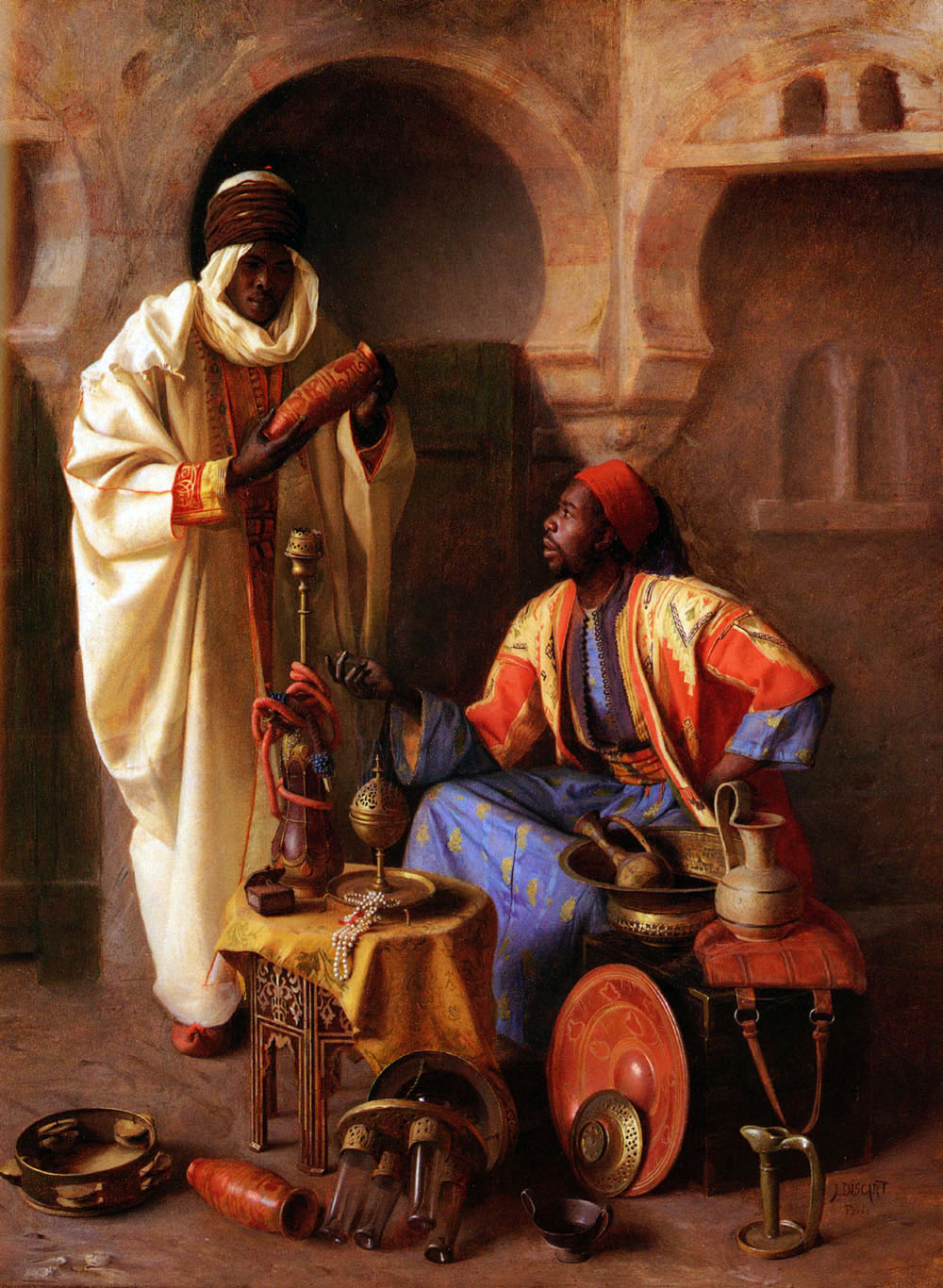
The Connoisseurs

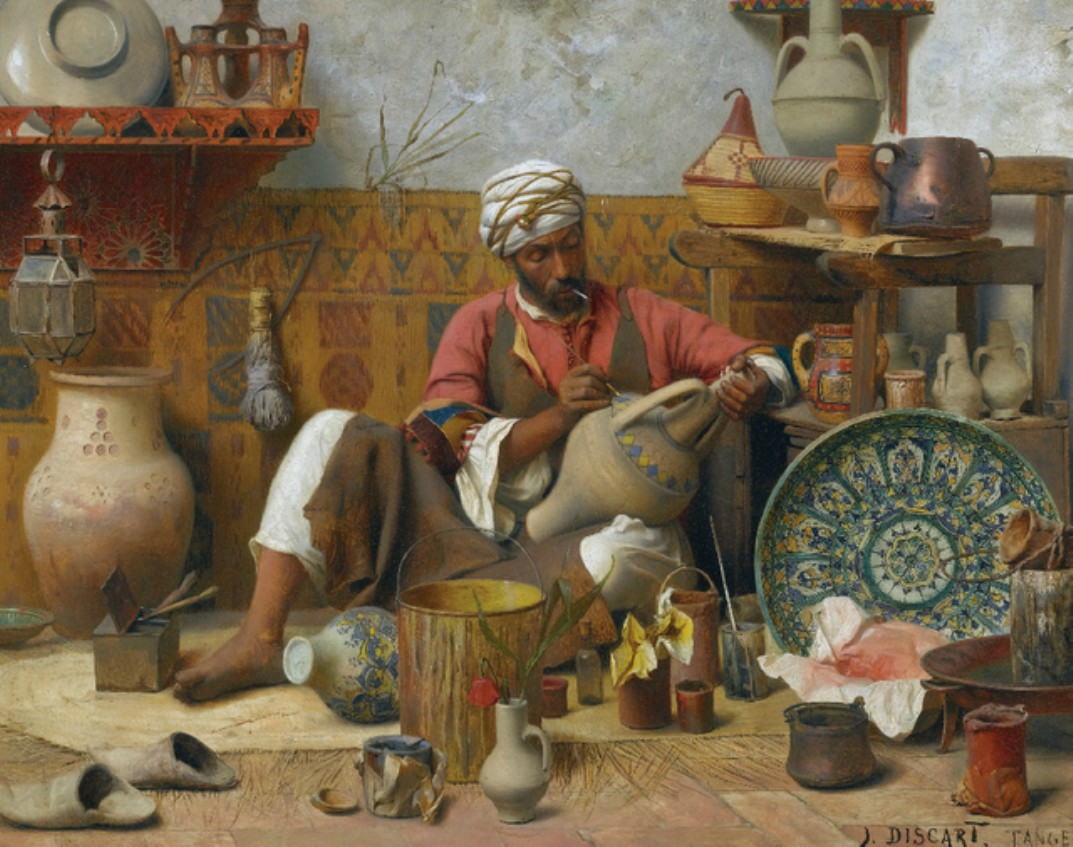
The Pottery Workshop

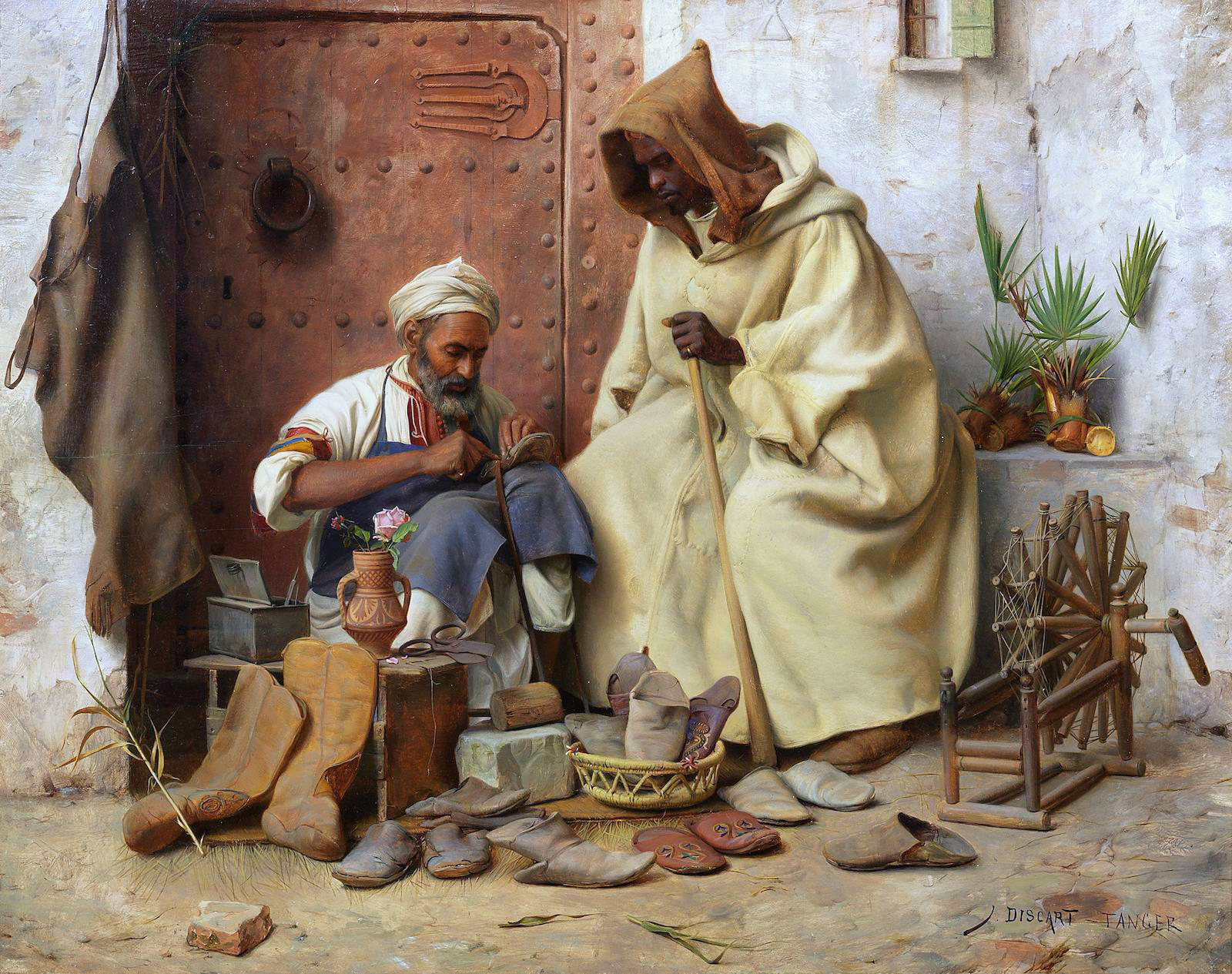
The Cobbler

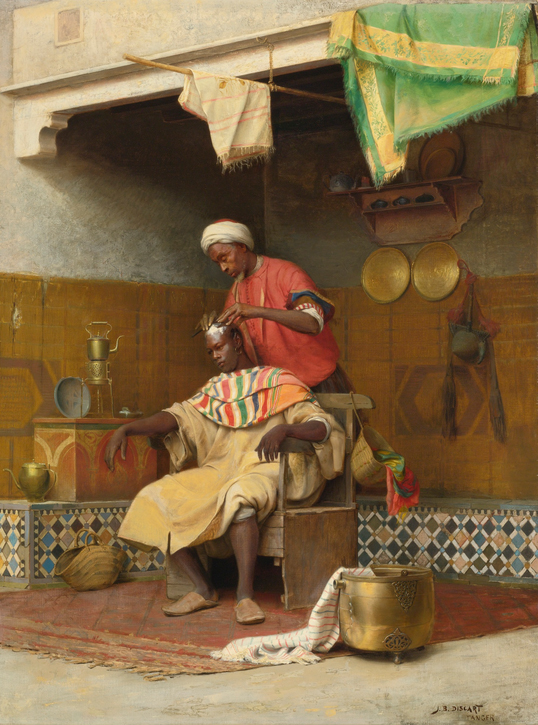
The Barber Shop

== Bibliography ==
- Haja, Martina; Wimmer, Günther (2000). Les Orientalistes des Écoles Allemande et Autrichienne (in French). ACR Édition. ISBN 2-86770-140-6.
- Kralt, Theo P.G. (2019). Jean Baptiste Discart (1855-1940) : oriëntalistische schilderijen en Nederlandse portretten (in Dutch). Van Gruting. ISBN 978-90-7587-975-9. OCLC 1112597105.
- Kralt, Theo P.G. (2020). Jean Baptiste Discart Orientalist paintings and Dutch portraits, Van Gruting Publishers, Utrecht, The Netherlands, ISBN 9789075879766.
