= Symposium (Feuerbach) =

Paintings by Ansel Feuerbach

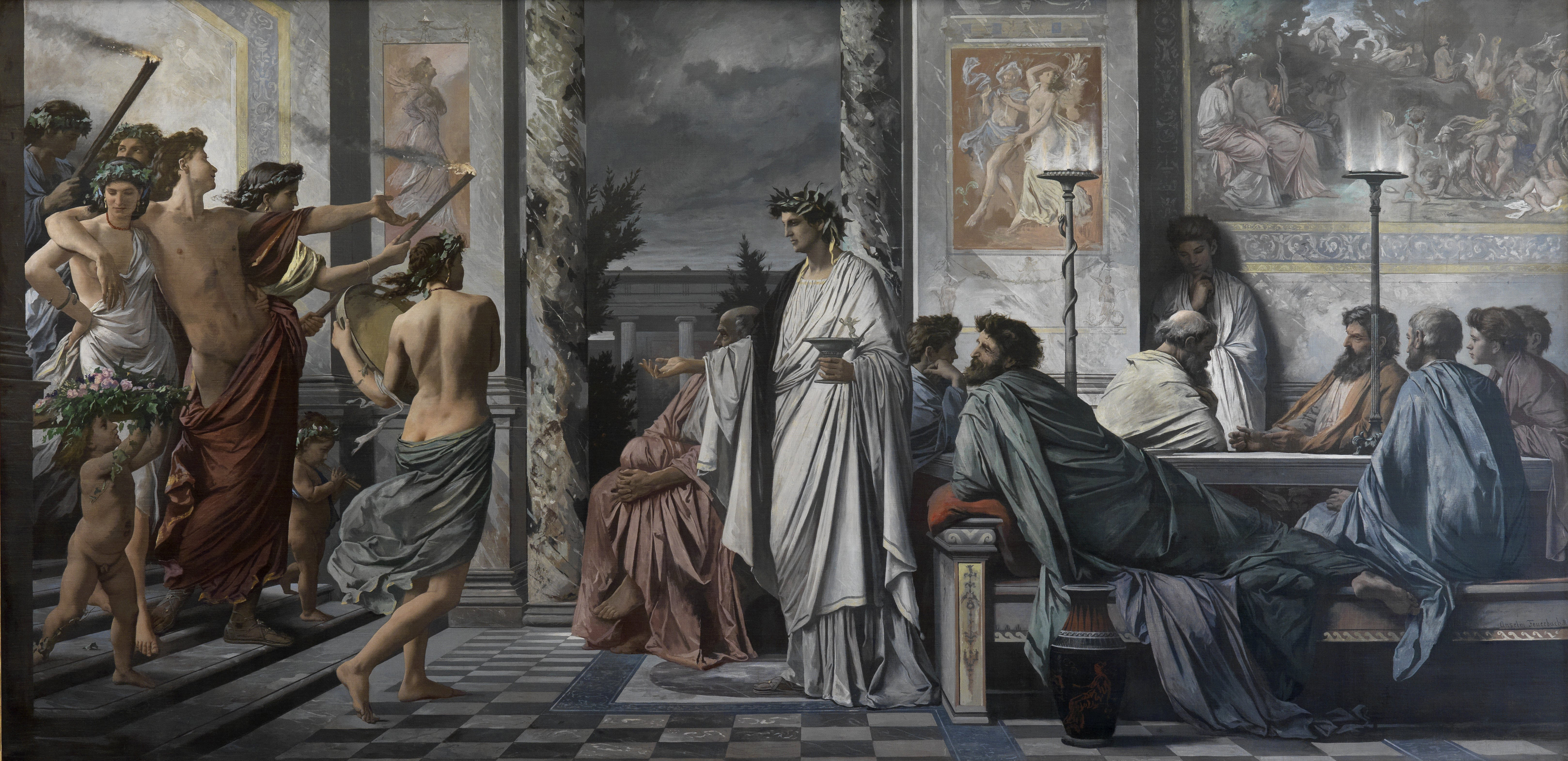
First version of the Symposium by Feuerbach, 1869.

Symposium or Das Gastmahl des Platon are paintings by the German painter Anselm Feuerbach from c. 1869 and 1873/74 of a moment from Plato's Symposium, when the drunken Alcibiades and revelers enter the house of the poet Agathon. Socrates, near the wall at right-centre, turns his back on the scene, and bows his head.

The 1869 painting is in the Staatliche Kunsthalle Karlsruhe and the 1874 painting in the Alte Nationalgalerie, Staatliche Museen zu Berlin.

== History ==
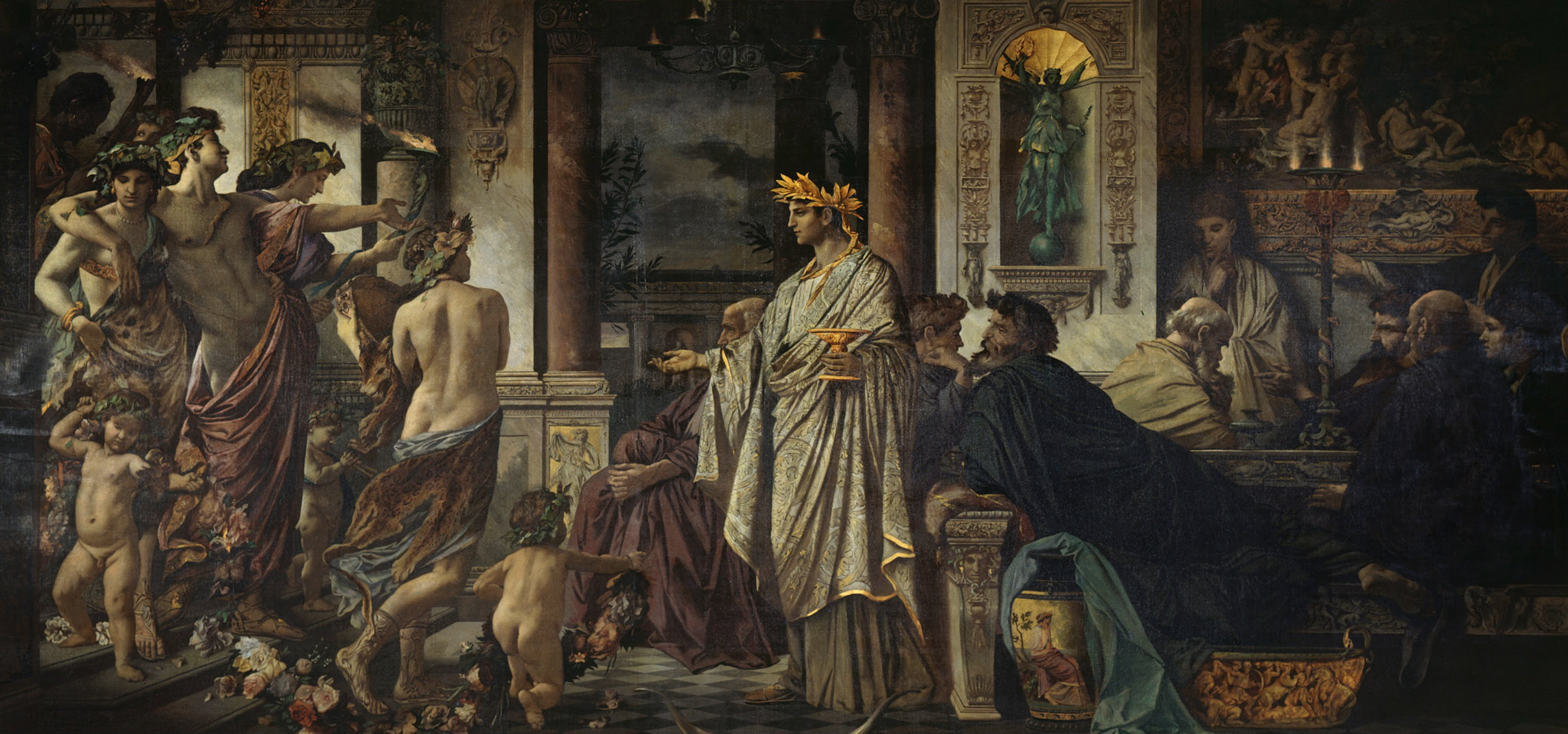
1874 version of the Symposium.

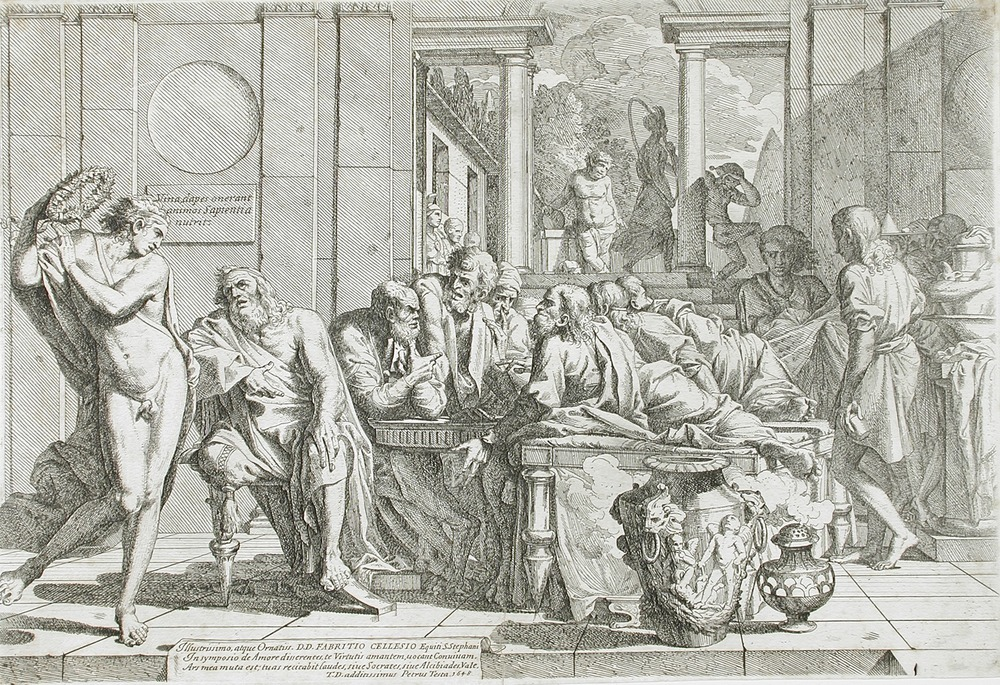
Etching of 1648 by Pietro Testa

Symposium was first displayed in 1869 at the Great International Art Exhibition, in Munich Germany. During the exhibition critics wrote, “a sea of ice that had forced itself undesired into a perfume shop.” Another critic, “An extreme of ugliness in form and color which borders on vulgarity and filth ... as if Feuerbach had put his paint brush into ink and calcium water instead of color.” The image ended up in a private collection. Feuerbach painted another more colorful version, which is since 1878 in the collection of the National Gallery in Berlin (Alte Nationalgalerie). However, the earlier 1869 version has been considered by some to be the superior of the two works on the subject. In the second version the decor and costumes have become still more elaborate and Victorian.

The subject was not common, but had been depicted in an etching of 1648 by Pietro Testa, with a similar basic composition, including Socrates ignoring the intrusion.
