= The Symposium (band) =

American indie rock band

- Origin: Chicago, Illinois, United States
- Genres: Indie rock; psychedelic rock; indie pop; garage rock revival
- Years active: 2013–2026
- Members: Charlie Gammill; Sam Clancy; Benny Goetz; MJ Tirabassi; Josh Goméz
- Website: thesymposium.net

The Symposium is an indie rock band from Chicago, Illinois. The group consists of Charlie Gammill (guitar, vocals), Sam Clancy (guitar, keyboard), MJ Tirabassi (guitar, bass), Josh Goméz (drums) and Benny Goetz (bass).

The band is influenced by and has been compared to The Strokes, Mac DeMarco and Ty Segall among others.

== History ==
The band was started by Sam Clancy and Charlie Gammill.

The Symposium’s 2014 debut album, Drugs, was compared to The Strokes.

They released their second album on April 20, 2017, a self-titled work described as consisting of elements of indie rock and pop, as well as psychedelic rock and garage rock.

In 2019, the band went on hiatus due to the COVID-19 epidemic.

Following the release of the single "Light Speed 2", they released their third album, The Sonic Age on December 30, 2024. On March 27, 2025, the band announced their first headlining summer tour.

== Discography ==
=== Albums ===
- Drugs (2014)
- The Symposium (2017)
- The Sonic Age (2024)

=== EPs ===
- "Brain Jail" (2013)
- "The Sonic Crystal EP" (2019)
- "Songs From the Void" (2025)
- "Songs From the Void 2" (2025)

=== Singles ===
- "Synth Song" (2016)
- "Red River" (2016)
- "Dracula's Lunch" (2017)
- "Sci-Fi" (2020)
- "facts of life" (2022)
- "the only thing" (2023)
- "Light Speed 2" (2024)
- "Miami" (2026)
