= Anselm Feuerbach =

German painter (1829–1880)

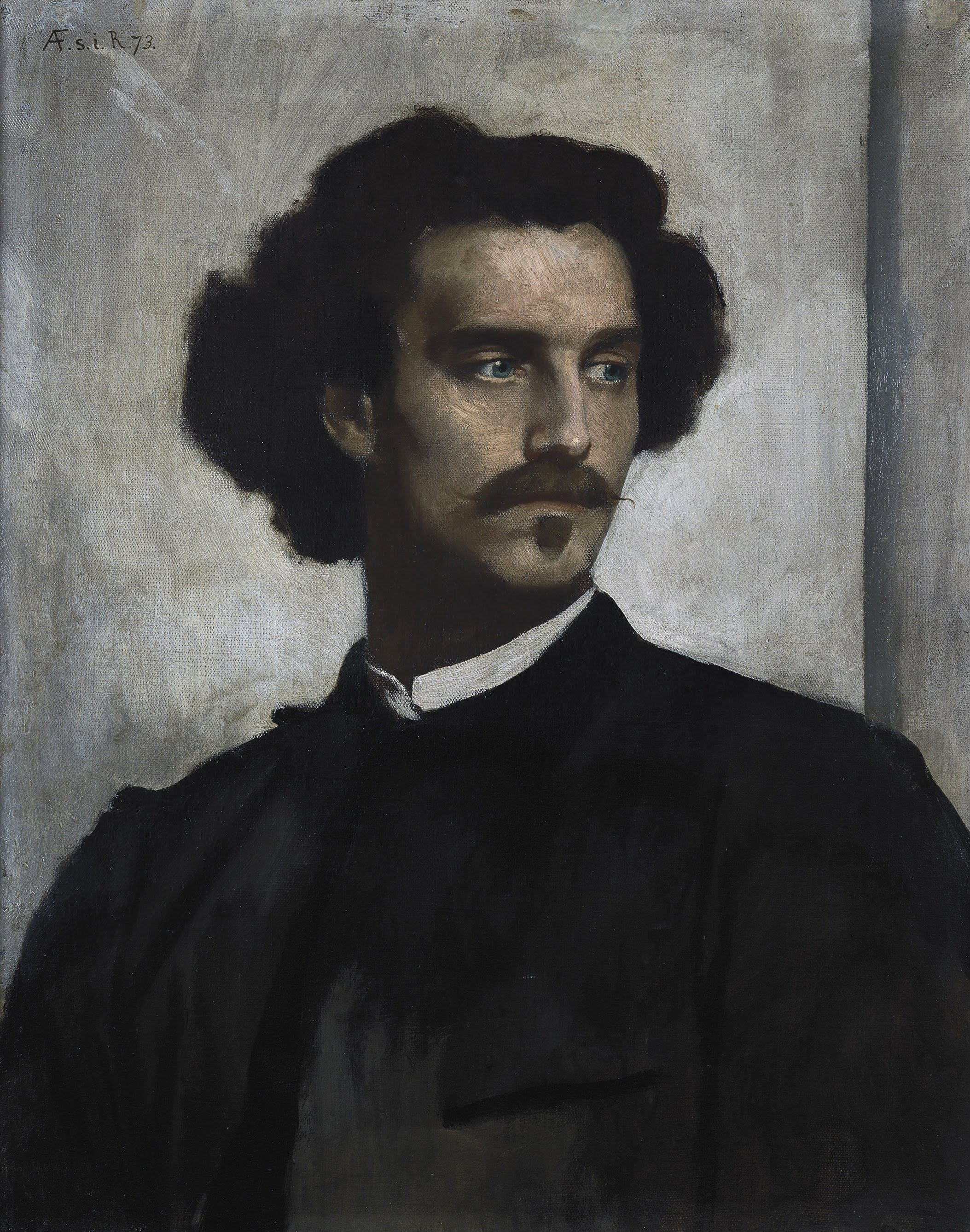
- Self-portrait (1873)
- Born: Anselm Feuerbach; 12 September 1829; Speyer, Kingdom of Bavaria
- Died: 4 January 1880 (aged 50); Venice, Kingdom of Italy
- Known for: Painting
- Movement: Neoclassicism

Signature
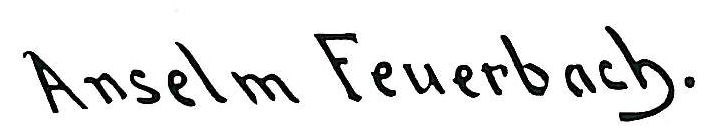

Anselm Feuerbach (12 September 1829 – 4 January 1880) was a German painter. He was the leading neoclassical painter of the German 19th-century school.

== Biography ==
=== Early life ===
Anselm Feuerbach (1852) by Thomas Couture

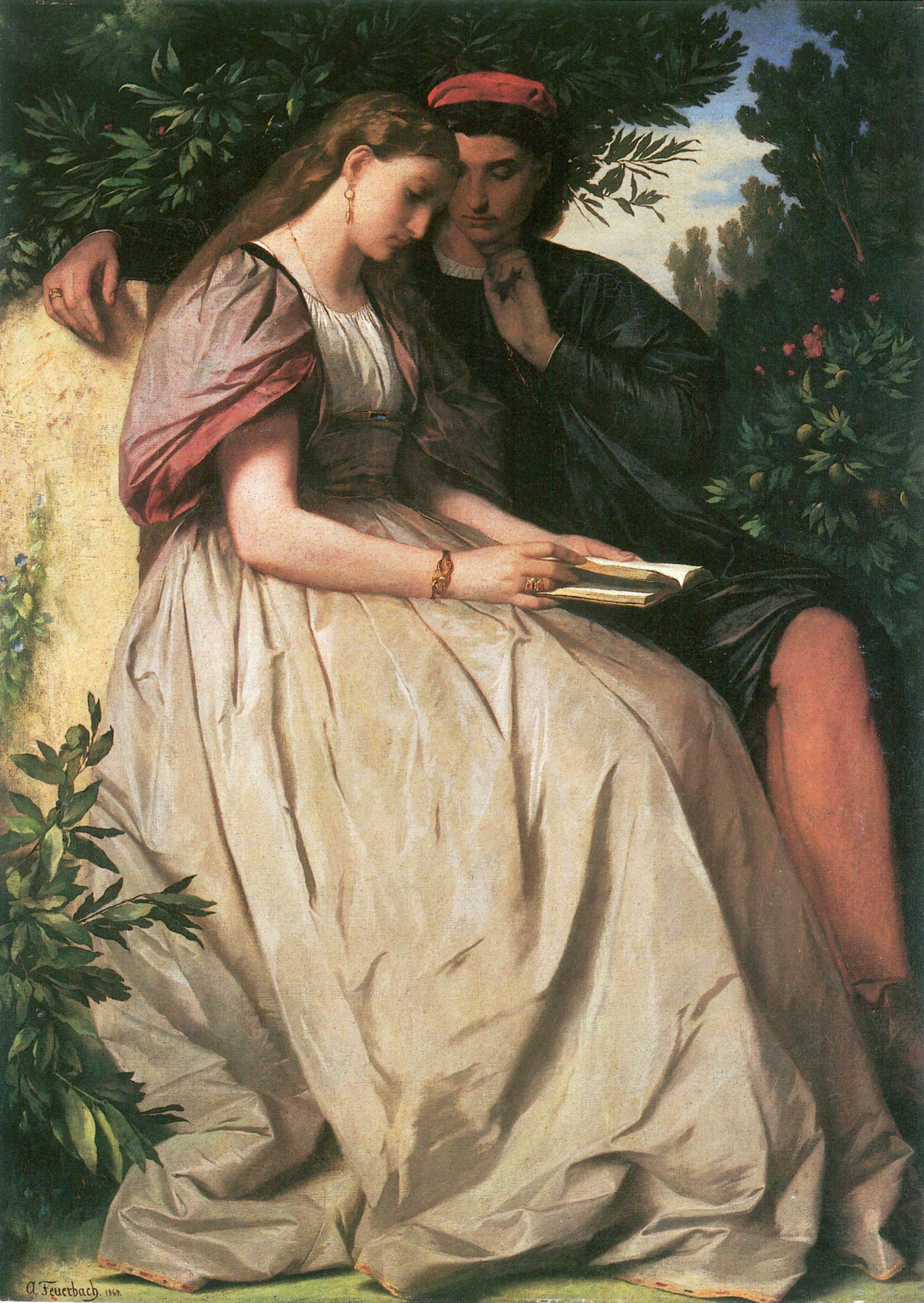
Francesca da Rimini und Paolo Malatesta c. 1864

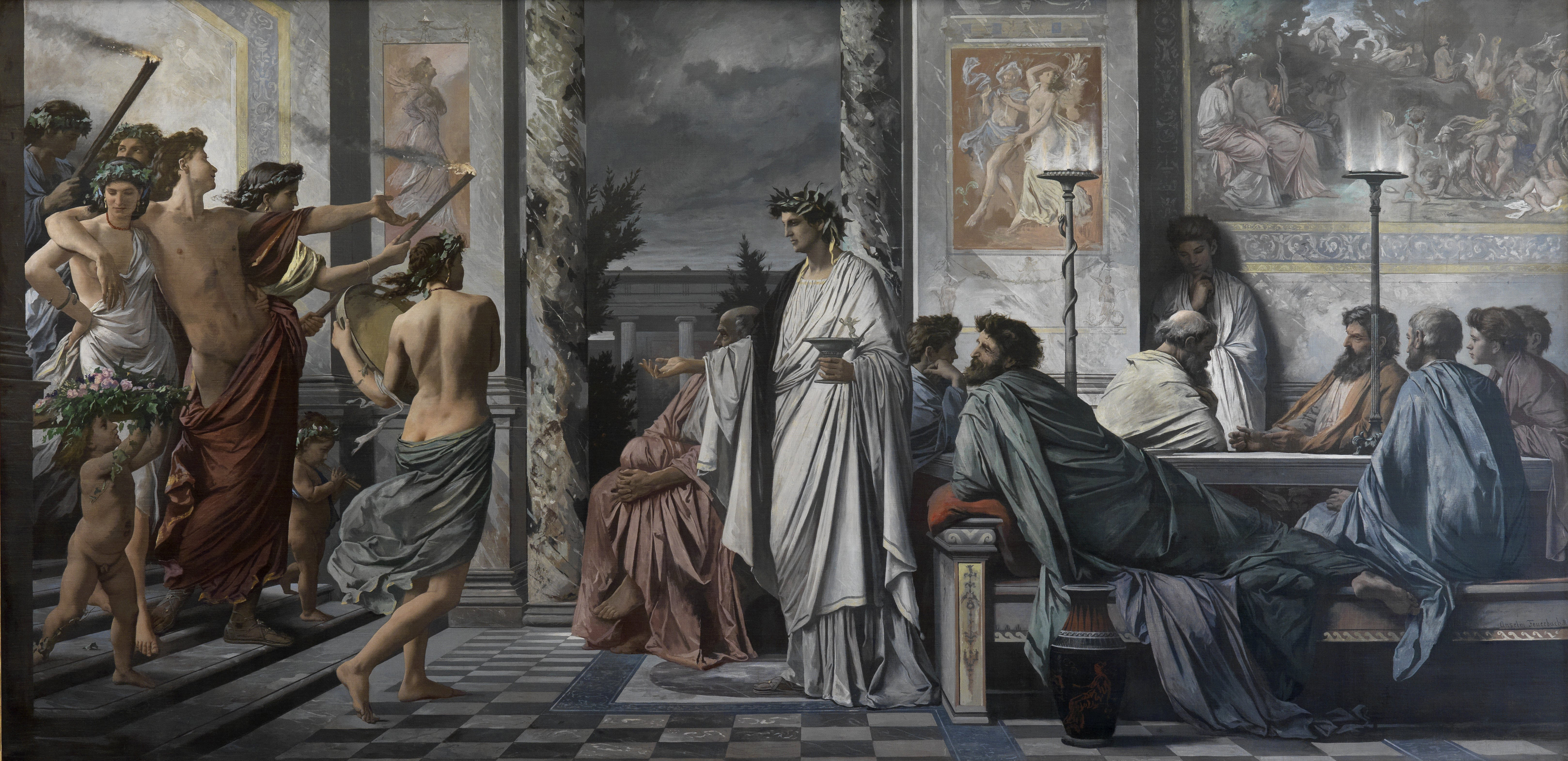
Plato's Symposium, 1869

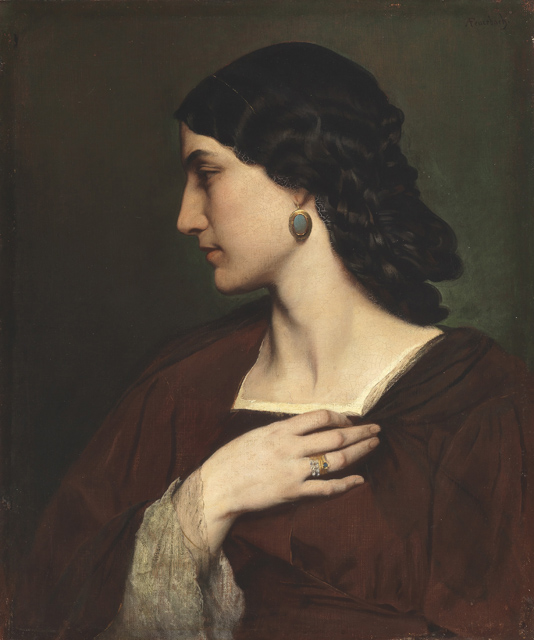
Nanna, 1861, Germanisches Nationalmuseum

Feuerbach was born at Speyer, the son of the archaeologist Joseph Anselm Feuerbach and the grandson of the legal scholar Paul Johann Anselm Ritter von Feuerbach. The house of his birth is now a small museum.

Between 1845 and 1848 he attended the Düsseldorf Academy, where he was taught by Johann Wilhelm Schirmer, Wilhelm von Schadow, and Carl Sohn. He went on to the Munich Academy, but in 1850, along with a number of other dissatisfied students, he moved to the academy at Antwerp, where he studied under Gustav Wappers. Feuerbach moved to Paris in 1851, where he was a pupil of Thomas Couture until 1854. It was in Paris that he produced his first masterpiece, Hafiz at the Fountain (1852).

In 1854, funded by Grand Duke Friedrich of Baden he visited Venice, where he fell under the spell of the greatest school of colourists, several of his works demonstrating a close study of the Italian masters. From there he continued to Florence and then to Rome. He remained in Rome until 1873, making brief visits back to Germany. In 1861 he met Anna Risi (known as "Nanna"), who sat as his model for the next four years. In 1866 she was succeeded as his principal model by Lucia Brunacci, an innkeeper's wife who posed for his pictures of Medea. In 1862 Feuerbach met Count Adolf Friedrich von Schack, who commissioned copies of Italian old masters from him. The count introduced him to Arnold Böcklin and Hans von Marées. The three artists became known as the Deutschrömer ("German Romans") because of their preference for Italian over German art.

Between 1869 and 1874 he painted two versions of Plato's Symposium.

In 1873 Feuerbach moved to Vienna, having been appointed professor of history painting at the Academy. Among his students were Ludwig Deutsch, Rudolf Ernst and Jean Discart. Later, Feuerbach developed a disagreement with architect Theophil Hansen over his ceiling mural The Fall of the Titans, painted for the Great Hall of the new academy building on the Ringstrasse. While in Vienna he came to know Johannes Brahms. After Feuerbach's death, Brahms composed Nänie, a piece for chorus and orchestra, in his memory.

=== Last years ===
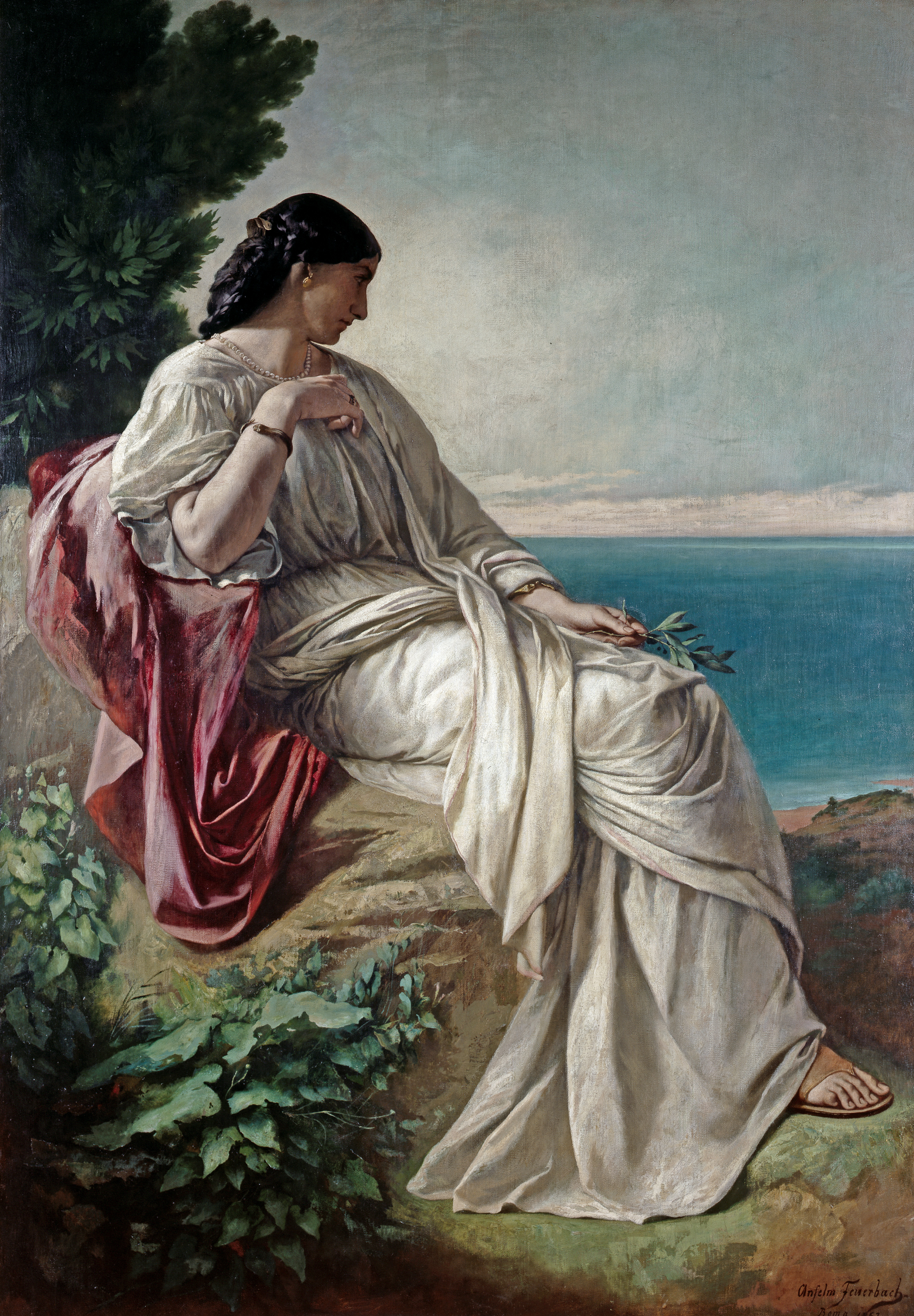
Iphigenia, first (1862) version (Hessisches Landesmuseum Darmstadt)

In 1877 Feuerbach resigned from his post at the Vienna Academy and moved to Venice, where he died in 1880.

Following his death, his step-mother Henriette, to whom he had always been close, and who had always done much to promote his career, wrote a book entitled Ein Vermächtnis ("A Testament" or "A Legacy"), including his letters and autobiographical notes. It proved enormously successful and greatly enhanced his posthumous reputation.

According to the 1911 Encyclopædia Britannica:

He was steeped in classic knowledge, and his figure compositions have the statuesque dignity and simplicity of Greek art. He was the first to realize the danger arising from contempt of technique, that mastery of craftsmanship was needed to express even the loftiest ideas, and that an ill-drawn coloured cartoon can never be the supreme achievement in art.

His works are housed at leading public galleries in Germany. Stuttgart has the second version of Iphigenia; Karlsruhe, the Dante at Ravenna; Munich, the Medea; and Berlin, The Concert, his last important painting. Other major works include The Battle of the Amazons, Pietà, The Symposium of Plato, Orpheus and Eurydice and Ariosto in the Park of Ferrara.

== See also ==
- List of German painters
