= List of political career biographies =

The following is a list of political career biographies. It is meant to complement the list of political memoirs page, with the key difference being that the books in this list are authored by persons other than the book's subject. This list is sorted by country and by the political position and last name of the book's subject:

== Australia ==
Richard Casey: Minister for Foreign Affairs 1951-1960

- R G Casey, Australian Foreign Minister, Collins 1972

Ben Chifley: Prime Minister 1945-1949

- Ben Chifley, Things Worth Fighting For, Melbourne University Press, 1952

Sir Robert Menzies: Prime Minister 1939-1941; 1949-1966

- R. G. Menzies, Afternoon Light, Cassell & Co., London, 1967

Graham Richardson: Senator 1983-1994

- Graham Richardson, Whatever It Takes (Bantam, 1994)

Gough Whitlam: Prime Minister 1972-1975

- Gough Whitlam, The Whitlam Government, Penguin, 1985

== United Kingdom ==
Karl Marx: Writer 1818-1883

- Karl Marx: His Life and Environment (1939) by Isaiah Berlin
- Karl Marx: The Story of His Life (1918) by Franz Mehring
- Karl Marx: His Life and Thought (1973) by David McLellan

== United States ==
=== U.S. Cabinet ===
Albright, Madeleine: Secretary of State under President Bill Clinton, 1997-2001

- Madeleine Albright : A Twentieth-Century Odyssey (2000) by Michael Dobbs

Brown, Ron: Secretary of Commerce under President Bill Clinton, 1993-1996

- Ron Brown: An Uncommon Life (2001) by Steven A. Holmes

Byrnes, James F.: Secretary of State under President Harry Truman, 1945-1947

- Sly and Able: A Political Biography of James F. Byrnes (1994; ISBN 0-393-03367-8) by David Robertson

Connally, John: Secretary of the Treasury under President Richard Nixon, 1971-1972

- The Lone Star: The Life of John Connally (1989) by James Reston Jr.

Dulles, John Foster: Secretary of Defense under President Dwight D. Eisenhower, 1953-1959

- Power and Peace: The Diplomacy of John Foster Dulles (1995) by Frederick Marks
- John Foster Dulles: Piety, Pragmatism, and Power in U.S. Foreign Policy (1998) by Richard H. Immerman

Forrestal, James: Secretary of Defense under President Harry Truman, 1947-1949

- Driven Patriot : The Life and Times of James Forrestal (1992) by Townsend Hoopes

Johnson, Louis: Secretary of Defense under President Harry Truman, 1949-1950

- Louis Johnson And the Arming of America: The Roosevelt And Truman Years (2005) by Keith D. McFarland and David L. Roll

Kissinger, Henry: Secretary of State under Presidents Richard Nixon and Gerald Ford, 1973-1977

- Kissinger Transcripts: The Top Secret Talks With Beijing and Moscow (1999) by William Burr
- The Flawed Architect : Henry Kissinger and American Foreign Policy (2004) by Jussi M. Hanhimaki
- The Price of Power: Kissinger in the Nixon White House (1983) by Seymour M. Hersh
- Sideshow, Revised Edition : Kissinger, Nixon, and the Destruction of Cambodia (2002) by William Shawcross
- The Nixon-Kissinger Years: Reshaping of America's Foreign Policy (1989) by Richard C. Thornton

Marshall, George C.: Secretary of State, 1947-1949, and Secretary of Defense, 1950-1951, under President Harry Truman

- George C. Marshall: Statesman 1945-1959 (1987) by Forrest Pogue

McNamara, Robert: Secretary of Defense under Presidents John F. Kennedy and Lyndon B. Johnson, 1961-1968

- Promise and Power: The Life and Times of Robert McNamara (1993) by Deborah Shapely

O'Neill, Paul: Secretary of the Treasury under President George W. Bush, 2001-2002

- The Price of Loyalty: George W. Bush, the White House, and the Education of Paul O'Neill (2004) by Ron Suskind

Rumsfeld, Donald: Secretary of Defense under President George W. Bush, 2001–present

- Rumsfeld's War: The Untold Story of America's Anti-Terrorist Commander (2004) by Rowan Scarborough

Vance, Cyrus: Secretary of State under President Jimmy Carter, 1977-1980

- Cyrus Vance (1985) by David S. McLellan

=== U.S. Supreme Court ===
Blackmun, Harry: 98th Supreme Court Justice, 1970-1994

- Becoming Justice Blackmun: Harry Blackmun's Supreme Court Journey (2005; ISBN 0-8050-7791-X) by Linda Greenhouse

Marshall, Thurgood: 96th Supreme Court Justice, 1967-1991

- Thurgood Marshall: Justice for All (1992; ISBN 0-88184-805-0) by Roger Goldman and David Gallen
- Dream Makers, Dream Breakers: The World of Justice Thurgood Marshall (1993; ISBN 0-316-75979-1) by Carl T. Rowan
- Thurgood Marshall : American Revolutionary (2000; ISBN 0-8129-3299-4) by Juan Williams

O'Connor, Sandra Day: 102nd Supreme Court Justice, 1981-2006

- Sandra Day O'Connor : How the First Woman on the Supreme Court Became Its Most Influential Justice (2005; ISBN 0-06-059018-1) by Joan Biskupic

Scalia, Antonin: 103rd Supreme Court Justice, 1986–present

- Justice Antonin Scalia and the Conservative Revival (1998; ISBN 0-8018-6094-6) by Richard A. Brisbin Jr.
- Scalia Dissents : Writings of the Supreme Court's Wittiest, Most Outspoken Justice (2004; ISBN 0-89526-053-0) by Kevin A. Ring
- American Original: The Life and Constitution of Supreme Court Justice Antonin Scalia (2009; ISBN 978-0-374-20289-7) by Joan Biskupic

Souter, David: 105th Supreme Court Justice, 1990–present

- David Hackett Souter: Traditional Republican On The Rehnquist Court (2005; ISBN 0-19-515933-0) by Tinsley E. Yarbrough

Thomas, Clarence: 106th Supreme Court Justice, 1991–present

- The Prince and the Pauper: The Case Against Clarence Thomas, Associate Justice of the U.S. Supreme Court (2001; ISBN 0-595-17179-6) by John L. Cooper and Armin Cooper
- Judging Thomas : The Life and Times of Clarence Thomas (2004; ISBN 0-06-052721-8) by Ken Foskett
- Supreme Discomfort : The Divided Soul of Clarence Thomas (2006; ISBN 0-385-51080-2) by Kevin Merida and Michael Fletcher
- Clarence Thomas: A Biography (2001; ISBN 1-893554-36-8) by Andrew Peyton Thomas

== See also ==
- List of American political memoirs
- List of Australian political memoirs
