= Timeline of Karl Marx =

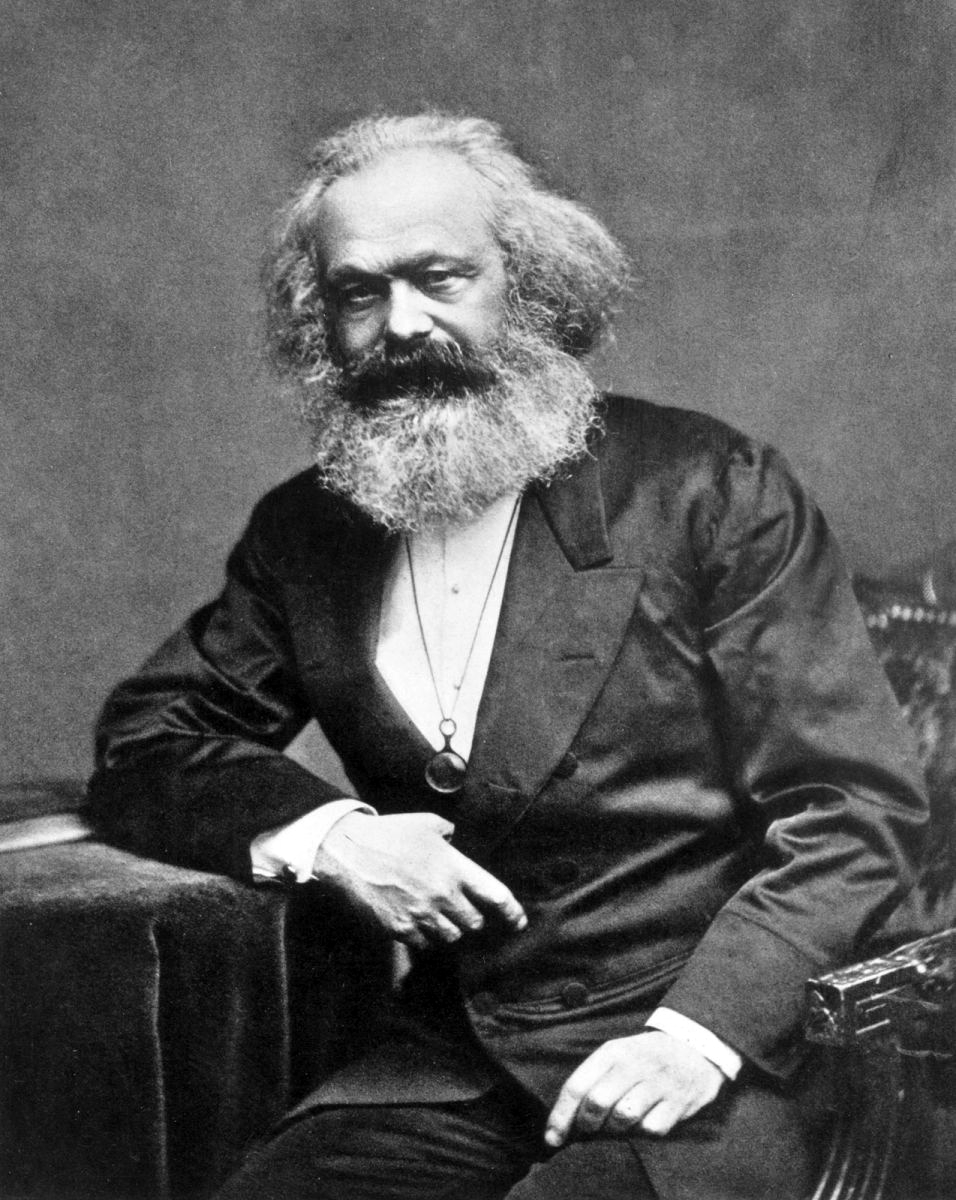
Karl Marx in 1875

Karl Marx (5 May 1818 – 14 March 1883) was a German philosopher, economist, sociologist, historian, journalist, and revolutionary socialist. Marx's work in economics laid the basis for the current understanding of labour and its relation to capital, and has influenced much of subsequent economic thought. He published numerous books during his lifetime, the most notable being The Communist Manifesto. Marx studied at the University of Bonn and the University of Berlin, where he became interested in the philosophical ideas of the Young Hegelians. After his studies, he wrote for a radical newspaper in Cologne, and began to work out his theory of dialectical materialism. He moved to Paris in 1843, where he began writing for other radical newspapers and met Fredrick Engels, who would become his lifelong friend and collaborator. In 1845 he was exiled and moved to London together with his wife and children where he continued writing and formulating his theories about social and economic activity. He also campaigned for socialism and became a significant figure in the International Workingmen's Association.

Marx's theories about society, economics and politics – collectively known as Marxism – hold that human societies progress through class struggle: a conflict between an ownership class that controls production and a dispossessed labouring class that provides the labour for production. He called capitalism the "dictatorship of the bourgeoisie," believing it to be run by the wealthy classes for their own benefit; and he predicted that, like previous socioeconomic systems, capitalism produced internal tensions which would lead to its self-destruction and replacement by a new system: socialism. He argued that class antagonisms under capitalism between the bourgeoisie and proletariat would eventuate in the working class' conquest of political power in the form of a dictatorship of the proletariat and eventually establish a classless society, socialism or communism, a society governed by a free association of producers. Along with believing in the inevitability of socialism and communism, Marx actively fought for their implementation, arguing that social theorists and underprivileged people alike should carry out organised revolutionary action to topple capitalism and bring about socio-economic change.

Marx has been described as one of the most influential figures in human history. Revolutionary socialist governments espousing Marxist concepts took power in a variety of countries in the 20th century, leading to the formation of such socialist states as the Soviet Union in 1922 and the People's Republic of China in 1949. Many labour unions and workers' parties worldwide are influenced by Marxism, while various theoretical variants, such as Leninism, Stalinism, Trotskyism, and Maoism, were developed from them. Marx is typically cited, with Émile Durkheim and Max Weber, as one of the three principal architects of modern social science.

== Timeline ==
The list on the left recounts significant events in the life of Karl Marx, and his friends and family. The list on the right provides contextual information, recounting wider political and historical events that had an effect on Marx.

Year	Marx	History
1814	12 February, Marx's future wife, Jenny von Westphalen (1814–1881) is born in Salzwedel, a town then part of the Kingdom of Prussia's Province of Saxony, as the daughter of Freiherr Ludwig von Westphalen (1770–1842) and his second wife Caroline, née Heubel, (1776–1856)	
1815		Following the Napoleonic Wars, the Congress of Vienna redraws the European map. Reaction and conservatism dominate Europe. The Concert of Europe attempts to preserve this settlement, but the forces of liberalism and nationalism make for dramatic changes
1816	The von Westphalens moves to Trier, where Ludwig von Westphalen soon befriends Heinrich Marx and the Marx family	Year Without a Summer
1818	5 May, Karl Marx is born as the eldest son, and second eldest child of eight, of the barrister Heinrich Marx (1777–1838) and his wife Henrietta, née Pressburg}, (1788–1863) in Trier, a town then part of the Kingdom of Prussia's Province of the Lower Rhine	
1820	20 November, Marx's future collaborator and friend, Friedrich Engels (1820–1895) is born in Barmen, Prussia as the oldest of nine children of the cotton manufacturer Friedrich Engels and his wife Elisabeth, née van Haar	
1825		26 December, Decembrist revolt in Russia
1830	October, after first being educated at home by his father, Marx is enrolled at the Friedrich Wilhelm Gymnasium in Trier at the age of twelve	Several revolutions and uprisings takes place in Europe and the Americas throughout 1830 and the following year; 26–29 July, the Bourbon monarch, King Charles X is overthrown in the French July Revolution; 25 August, outbreak of the Belgian Revolution which eventually leads to the establishment of an independent Kingdom of Belgium in 1831
1831		14 November, the German philosopher Georg Wilhelm Friedrich Hegel (1770–1831) (portrait pictured), whose ideas on dialectics would influence much of Marx's work, dies at the age of 61
1832		27–30 May, the Hambach Festival, a mass political demonstration, is held in the Palatinate region demanding the unification of Germany
1835	24 September, Marx graduates Friedrich Wilhelm Gymnasium with good grades in Latin and Greek, decent in French and Mathematics, and a low grade in History; 15 October, at the age of seventeen, Marx is enrolled by his father at the University of Bonn as a law student, despite his wishes to study philosophy and literature	
1836	Summer, Marx is engaged to his childhood friend Jenny von Westphalen in Trier; 22 October, having mismanaged his studies in Bonn, Marx is enrolled at the Frederick William University in Berlin as a law student and soon becomes a member of the Young Hegelians	
1838	10 May, Marx's father, Heinrich, dies in Trier	Chartism, the first mass revolutionary workers’ movement, emerges in England
1840		7 June, following his father's death Frederick William IV (1795–1861) is crowned King of Prussia
1841	Engels performs one year of compulsory military service with the Prussian Army in Berlin. While in the city he befriends the Zionist philosopher and socialist Moses Hess (1812–1875), attends lectures at the Frederick William University and, like Marx before him, comes in contact with the Young Hegelians; 23 January, two poems by Marx, "Der Spielmann" and "Nachtliebe", are published in the periodical Athenäum in Berlin; 15 April, Marx is conferred on him the degree of Doctor of Philosophy by the University of Jena, where he submitted his doctoral thesis, The Difference Between the Democritean and Epicurean Philosophy of Nature, in absentia, as it was deemed too controversial for the Frederick William University	Publication of Ludwig Feuerbach's (1804–1872) (pictured) The Essence of Christianity, an important work for the Young Hegelians
1842	5 May, Marx begins writing for the Rheinische Zeitung (front-page pictured) in Cologne, where he becomes editor-in-chief on 15 October and publishes increasingly more radical articles; 12 April to 22 December, Engels anonymously contributes a total of seventeen articles to the Rheinische Zeitung; 3 March, Freiherr Ludwig von Westphalen, the father of Marx's fiancée Jenny, dies in Trier; 16 November, Marx first encounters Engels, who visits the office of the Rheinische Zeitung on his way to England	
1843	In Manchester, Engels met Mary Burns (1823–1863), a young working woman with radical opinions. They begin a relationship that lasts until her death two decades later, although they never marry; 17 March, under censorship and heavy pressure from the Prussian government, Marx resigns as editor-in-chief of the Rheinische Zeitung; 31 March, the last issue of the Rheinische Zeitung is published before it is completely banned the following day; 19 June, Marx marries Jenny von Westphalen in Bad Kreuznach; October, seeing that further political activity in Germany is impossible, Marx moves to Paris; Late December, in Paris Marx meets the expatriate German poet Heinrich Heine (1797–1856), his third cousin once removed	
1844	Marx befriends the anarchists Mikhail Bakunin (1814–1876) and Pierre-Joseph Proudhon (1809–1865) in Paris; February, together with Arnold Ruge (1802–1880), Marx publishes the first, and only, issue of Deutsch–Französische Jahrbücher; May, in a letter Marx formally breaks off any future relationship with Ruge, after quarrelling repeatedly over money and other matters during the publication of Deutsch–Französische Jahrbücher; 1 May, Karl and Jenny Marx's eldest daughter Jenny Caroline (1844–1883) is born in Paris; 28 August, meets Friedrich Engels (pictured) at the Café de la Régence in Paris, this second encounter becomes the start of their lifelong friendship and intellectual collaboration; Winter, works on the Economic and Philosophic Manuscripts, also known as the Paris Manuscripts, first published in 1932	
1845	3 February, under pressure of the Prussian government Marx is expelled from Paris and moves to Brussels; 24 February, publishes The Holy Family, written together with Engels the year before; Spring, writes the "Theses on Feuerbach", first published by Engels in 1888; 6 September, birth of Jenny and Karl Marx's second daughter Laura	
1846	Summer, finishes work on The German Ideology together with Engels, however they find no publisher and the work is not published until 1932	
1847 Publication of the first German edition of The Poverty of Philosophy, translated by Eduard Bernstein and Karl Kautsky	July, The Poverty of Philosophy, written in French, is published in Paris and Brussels as an answer to the economic and philosophical arguments of French anarchist Pierre-Joseph Proudhon set forth in his 1846 book The System of Economic Contradictions, or The Philosophy of Poverty.; Late August, foundation of the German Workers' Society in Brussels; 29 November to 8 December, participates in the first congress of the Communist League in London and is tasked, together with Engels, to write a manifesto on behalf of the group; 17 December, birth of Jenny and Karl Marx's eldest son Edgar (1847–1855) in Brussels	
1848	24 February, publication of the Communist Manifesto in German; 4 March, arrested in Brussels and expelled to Paris; 1 June, editor-in-chief of the Neue Rheinische Zeitung, writes approximately 80 articles until 19 May 1849	In what remains the most widespread revolutionary wave in European history, several revolutions takes place throughout 1848 and the beginning of the following year, before reactionary forces regains control and the revolutions collapse
1849		
1850		
1851		
1852		
1853		
1854		
1855	16 January, the Marx's youngest child Eleanor (1855–1898) is born in London; 6 April, the son Edgar dies in London at the age of 8 from gastric fever	
1856		
1857		
1858		
1859		24 November, publication of Charles Darwin's (1809–1882) On the Origin of Species (caricature of Darwin pictured)
1860		
1861		
1862		
1863	30 November, Marx's mother, Henriette, dies in Trier	
1864		
1865		
1866		
1867	14 September, publication of the first volume of Das Kapital (title page pictured), Marx's influential analysis of political economy and criticism of the capitalist mode of production	
1868		
1869		
1870	During 1870 and the following year Engels writes about 60 articles on the Franco-Prussian War for the London daily newspaper the Pall Mall Gazette; September, Engels moves from Manchester to London	22 April, birth of Vladimir Lenin; 19 July, outbreak of the Franco-Prussian War
1871		1 January, formation of the German Empire; 21 March, Otto von Bismarck becomes Chancellor of Germany
1872		
1873		
1874		
1875		22–27 May, the Socialist Workers' Party of Germany is founded at the unity congress in Gotha. At the congress the party adopts the Gotha Program, calling for universal suffrage, freedom of association, limits on the working day, and for other laws protecting the rights and health of workers
1876		
1877		
1878		18 December, birth of Joseph Stalin
1879		7 November, birth of Leon Trotsky
1880		
1881	2 December, Marx's wife Jenny dies in London after a long illness	
1882		
1883	11 January, At the age of 38, Marx's eldest daughter Jenny dies at Argenteuil near Paris, probably from cancer of the bladder, a condition which had afflicted her for some time; 14 March, Marx dies in his home in London; 17 March, Marx is buried at Highgate Cemetery; After the death of Marx, Engels dedicates himself to the editing and publication of their works	
1884		
1885	Engels publishes the second volume of Das Kapital	
1886		* March 5, birth of Dong Biwu
1887		
1888		
1889		
1890		
1891		January 22, birth of Antonio Gramsci
1892		
1893		26 December, birth of Mao Zedong
1894	After nine years of work Engels publishes the third volume of Das Kapital	
1895	5 August, at the age of 74, Engels dies in London of throat cancer	
1896		
1897		
1898	31 March, at the age of 43, Eleanor Marx commits suicide after discovering that her partner, Edward Aveling, had secretly married a young actress in June the previous year	
1899		
1900		
1901		
1902		
1903		
1904		* August 22, birth of Deng Xiaoping
1905	Karl Kautsky publishes Marx's manuscript Theories of Surplus Value, often referred to as the "fourth volume of Das Kapital", in three volumes between 1905 and 1910	
1906		
1907		
1908		
1909		* June 23, birth of Li Xiannian
1910		
1911	26 November, at the age of 66, Marx's second daughter Laura commits suicide together with her husband Paul Lafargue, 69, in Draveil outside of Paris	

== Bibliography ==
- Barnett, Vincent (2009). Marx. Routledge Historical Biographies. Routledge. ISBN 978-0415435925.
- Berlin, Isaiah (1996) [First published 1939]. Karl Marx: His Life an Environment (fourth ed.). Oxford University Press. ISBN 978-0195103267.
- Easton, Loyd David; Guddat, Kurt H., eds. (1997) [First published 1967]. Writings of the Young Marx on Philosophy and Society. Hackett Publishing Company. ISBN 978-0872203686.
- Freeman, Richard B. (1977), "On the Origin of Species", The Works of Charles Darwin: An Annotated Bibliographical Handlist (2nd ed.), Folkestone, England: Dawson, ISBN 0-7129-0740-8
- Gabriel, Mary (2011). Love and Capital: Karl and Jenny Marx and the Birth of a Revolution. Little, Brown & Company. ISBN 978-0316066112.
- Hobsbawm, Eric (2011). How to Change the World: Tales of Marx and Marxism 1840-2011. Little, Brown. ISBN 978-1-4087-0287-1.
- Holmes, Rachel (2014). Eleanor Marx: A Life. Bloomsbury Publishing. ISBN 978-0-7475-8384-4.
- Hunt, Tristram (2009). The Frock-Coated Communist: The Revolutionary Life of Friedrich Engels. Allen Lane. ISBN 978-0713998528.
- McLellan, David (2006). Karl Marx: A Biography (fourth ed.). Palgrave MacMillan. ISBN 978-1403997302.
- McLellan, David (1974). Karl Marx: His Life and Thought. Harper & Row. ISBN 978-0060128296.
- McLellan, David (1969). The Young Hegelians and Karl Marx. MacMillan. ISBN 978-0333087886.
- Singer, Peter (1980). Marx. Past Masters. Oxford University Press. ISBN 978-0-19-287510-5.
- Sperber, Jonathan (2013). Karl Marx: A Nineteenth-Century Life. W. W. Norton & Co. ISBN 978-0871404671.
- Wheen, Francis (1999). Karl Marx. London: Fourth Estate. ISBN 978-1-85702-637-5.
- Wheen, Francis (2006). Marx's Das Kapital: A Biography. Books that Shook the World. London: Atlantic Books. ISBN 978-1-84-354400-5.
