= Karl Marx (disambiguation) =

Karl Marx (1818–1883) was a German philosopher and economist.

Karl Marx or Karl Marks may also refer to:

== People ==
- Karl Friedrich Heinrich Marx (1796–1877), German physician and lecturer
- Karl Marx (medical missionary) (1857–1891), German doctor
- Karl Marx (composer) (1897–1985), German composer
- Karl Marx (journalist), (1897-1966), German journalist
- Karl Marx (painter), lecturer at Kölner Werkschulen

== Literature ==
- Karl Marx: His Life and Environment, a 1939 book by Isaiah Berlin
- Karl Marx: His Life and Thought, a 1973 book by David McLellan
- Karl Marx: The Story of His Life, a 1918 book by Franz Mehring

== Ships ==
- Karl Marks (ship), a river cruise ship
- Karl Marks (ship, 1957), a Rodina-class motorship
- Karl Marks (ship, 1958), a river cruise ship

== Other uses ==
- Karl Marx Peak, a mountain peak in Tajikistan
- Karl Marks, Jalal-Abad, a village in Kyrgyzstan
- Chemnitz, a German city named Karl-Marx-Stadt from 1953 to 1990
- Karl-Marx-Allee, a monumental boulevard in Berlin
- Karl-Marx-Hof, a large residential building in Vienna, Austria
- Karl Marx Theatre (Teatro Karl Marx), a large entertainment complex in Havana, Cuba
- Karl Marx House or Karl-Marx-Haus, the house in Trier in which Karl Marx was born
- University of Leipzig, named Karl Marx University from 1953 to 1991

== See also ==
- Marx (disambiguation)
