= Wage Labour and Capital =

1847 work by Karl Marx

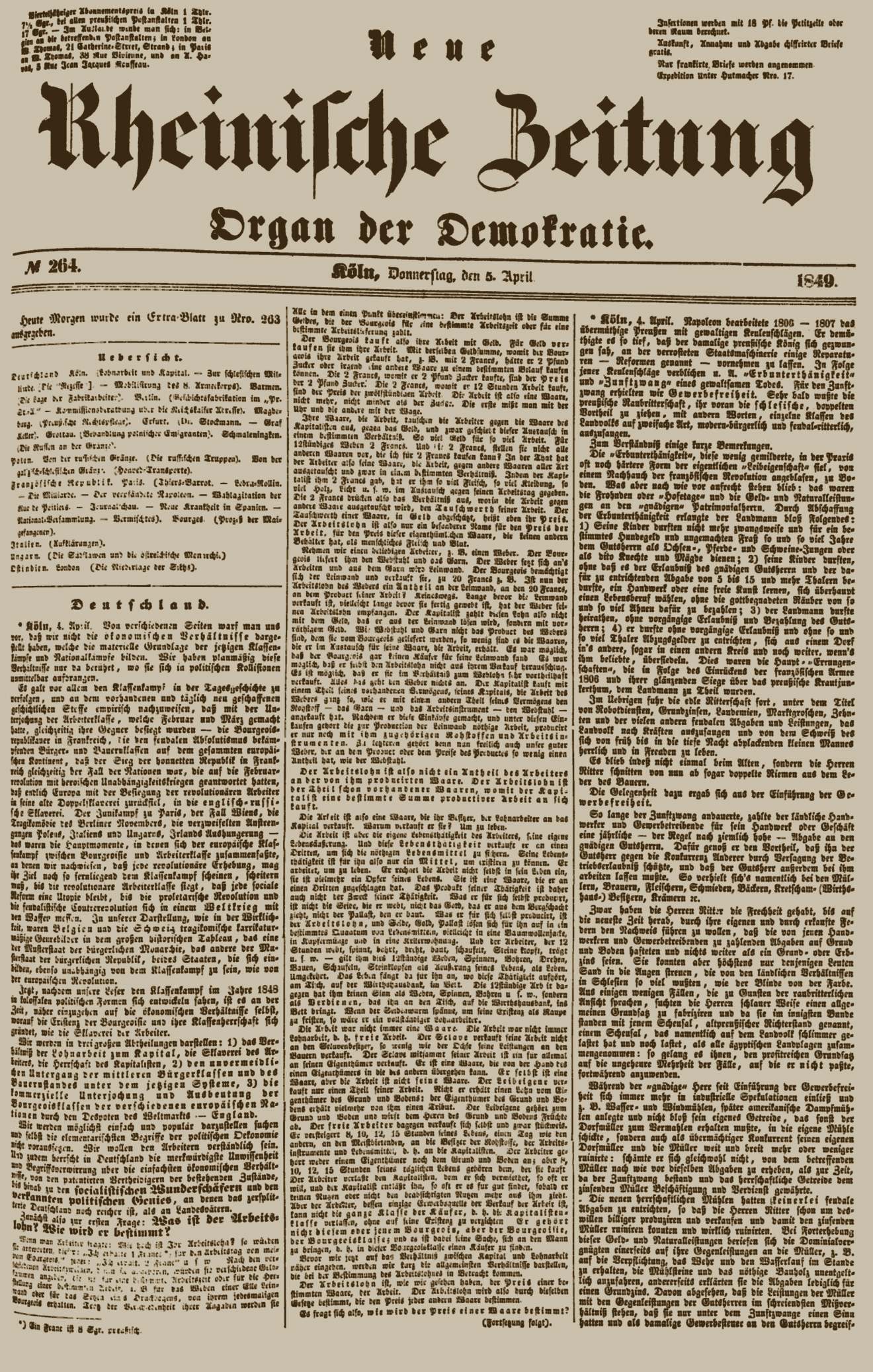
Neue Rheinische Zeitung no. 264 (5 April 1849) with the first part of Lohnarbeit und Kapital under the headline "Deutschland."

Wage Labour and Capital (German: Lohnarbeit und Kapital) is the text of the 1847 lectures by the political economist and philosopher Karl Marx, held in Brussels, and first published as five articles in the Neue Rheinische Zeitung in April 1849. It was later republished in many different forms and many languages as a pamphlet or booklet. It is said to consist, in an embryonic form, important arguments concerning the relation between labour and capital in his major work Das Kapital (1867) twenty years later.

This text is sometimes paired with Marx's 1865 lecture Value, Price and Profit.

== Background ==
Marx started studying political economy intensively between 1843 and 1847, when he was in exile in Paris and Brussels. Evidence of this bear his unpublished Economic and Philosophic Manuscripts of 1844 (eventually published in the early 1930s after his death) and Misère de la Philosophie (The Poverty of Philosophy), published in French in 1847.

An important input to his economic studies was given by Friedrich Engels, who published in 1844 "Umrisse zu einer Kritik der Nationalökonomie" (Outlines of a Critique of Political Economy) in the Deutsch–Französische Jahrbücher (German-French annals) and in 1845 Die Lage der arbeitenden Klasse in England (The Condition of the Working Class in England).

In some biographies Wage-Labour and Capital is only shortly mentioned, wedged between the German Ideology of 1847 and the Communist Manifesto of 1848. But the text marks an interesting point in the development of fundamental concepts of marxist economic theory. Marx stated for the first time his thoughts about the relative pauperisation of the proletariat, and he sketches the outlines of the theory of the reserve army of workers. Mehring, in his Karl Marx. Geschichte seines Leben (1918; Karl Marx: The Story of His Life), gives an important role to the lectures on wage labour and capital that were delivered by Marx to the German Workingmen's Club in Brussels in 1847. He stresses the fact that Marx here defines capital as a social productive relation. "Marx then sums up : If capital grows rapidly, the competition amongst the workers grows still more rapidly, that is to say, the more, comparatively, are the means of occupation and the means of life of the workers reduced, but nevertheless, the speedy growth of capital is the most favourable condition for wage-labour."

The editors of the Selected Works of Marx and Engels write that the lecture and newspaper articles were meant to be a "popular" presentation of the economic relations under capitalism and the material basis for class struggle.

Vitaly Vygodski, in his The Story of a Great Discovery points out that in Wage Labour and Capital Marx came very close to the point of "solving the problem of exchange between wage-labour and capital", but that it took ten more years for him to make this leap, and make the "revolutionary transformation of political economy from the bourgeois to the Marxist approach".

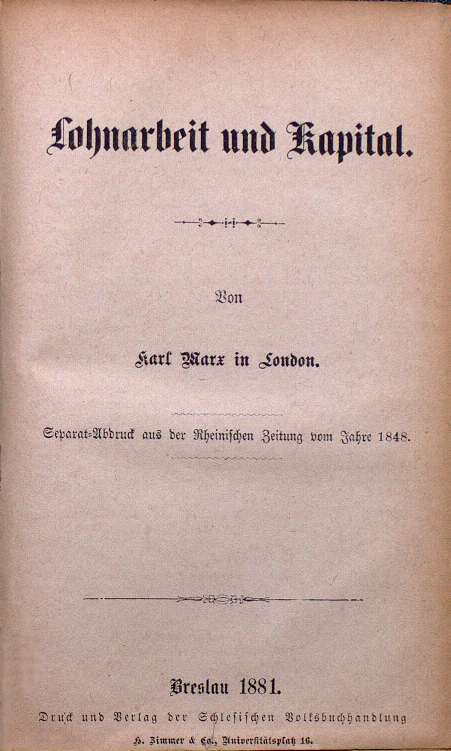
Lohnarbeit und Kapital 1881 edition

== Editions ==
Roughly spoken, two periods of publication of the (German) text, and subsequent translations (in English), can be distinguished: The first period, with the original text of Marx, published in different forms between 1849 and 1886. The second period, with the publications, edited by Friedrich Engels, from 1891 onwards.

=== 1849-1886 ===
- The publication history starts with the original publication of five articles (in German) in the Neue Rheinische Zeitung nrs 264, 265, 266, 267 and 269 of 5, 6, 7, 8 and 11 April 1849.
  - For an online edition, entitled "Lohnarbeit und Kapital", see Bibliotheca Augustana.
  - For a facsimile of the journal, see Deutsches Textarchiv (German digital text archive).
- the text was published as a brochure (in German) of 24 pages, based on the articles in Neue Rheinische Zeitung, for the first time, more than 30 years later, in 1881, in Breslau by the Schlesische Volksbuchhandlung (People's Bookstore of Silesia). The cover of the leaflet has the following text: "Lohnarbeit und Kapital. Von Karl Marx in London. Separat-Abdruck aus der Rheinischen Zeitung vom Jahre 1848 (Wage Labour and Capital. By Karl Marx in London. Offprint from "(Neue) Rheinische Zeitung" of 1848).
- In 1883 publication in Russian followed, as a 54 pages brochure entitled Naemnyj trud i kapital.
- In 1884 the Schweizerische Genossenschaftsbuchdruckerei in Hottingen-Zürich published the German text as a booklet.
- The first English translation was made by James Leigh Joynes and was published in 1886:
  Marx, Karl (1886). Wage-Labour and Capital (1886) . Translated by Joynes, James Leigh. London: The Modern Press – via Wikisource.

=== 1891 and later ===
In 1891 an edition, edited by Friedrich Engels appeared. Engels decided to make some small, but important changes, of which the most striking one was that the labourer does not sell his labour to the capitalist, but his labour power.

Later on this edition was most often used and cited.

- In 1891 this German edition was published in Berlin with the title Lohnarbeit und Kapital. Separat-Abdruck aus der 'Neuen Rheinischen Zeitung' vom Jahre 1849. Mit einer Einleitung von Friedrich Engels. (Wage-labour and capital. Offprint from Neue Rheinische Zeitung of 1849. With an introduction by Friedrich Engels). It was published by the publishers of the German social-democratic paper Vorwärts after the Anti-Socialist Laws had lapsed the previous year.
  - The English translation in marxists.org (the Marxists Internet Archive) is based on the 1891 pamphlet edition.
- A Russian translation of this new edition followed in 1894.
- An English translation (again by Joynes) of this new edition was published in 1897 and later years:
  e.g. Marx, Karl (1899). Wage-Labor and Capital . Translated by Joynes, James Leigh. New York: International Library Publishing Co. – via Wikisource.
- In 1902 a new English edition appeared, translated by Harriet Eleanor Lothrop:
  Marx, Karl (1902). Wage-Labor and Capital . Translated by Lothrop, Harriet E. New York: New York Labour News Company – via Wikisource.

== Reception and assessment ==
As for instance Thomas points out, "Marx intended his writings to be understood by the workers", and therefore they do not "presuppose a knowledge of even the most elementary notions of political economy."

The lecture and newspaper articles were meant to be a presentation of the economic relations under capitalism and the material basis for class struggle. It did suggest that class rule of the bourgeoisie in capitalist society rests on the wage slavery of the workers. In his theoretical exercise—later developed into his theory of surplus value—Marx explained the poverty experienced by the working class. The work also represents the depth to which Marx had developed his theories by the late 1840s. In this early theoretical formulation of Marxism, it was already clearly suggested that alienated labor is accumulated into capital through the capitalist mode of production. Marx suggested capitalism was a transitional historical period that would eventually lead to the proletarian revolution.

The essay defines the prices of commodities based on the economic principles of supply and demand. Marx also introduces the labour theory of value, where labour power is a commodity within capitalism. This labour power produces value greater than what the workers exchange with the capitalist for wages. This is the source of relative pauperisation of the proletariat, and wages harm the growth of productive capital.

== Sources ==
- Marx, Karl; Engels, Friedrich (1968). Progress Publishers, Moscow (ed.). Selected Works in One Volume. London: Lawrence and Wishart. ISBN 978-0-85315-181-4. (for Wage Labour and Capital see p. 64f.)
- Marx, Karl; Engels, Friedrich (1969). Institute of Marxism-Leninism under the Central Committee of the Communist Party of the Soviet Union (ed.). Selected Works in Three Volumes : First Volume. Moscow: Progress Publishers. (for Wage Labour and Capital see p. 142f.)
- Marx, Karl; Engels, Friedrich (1972). Tucker, Robert C. (ed.). The Marx-Engels Reader. New York: W. W. Norton & Company. ISBN 978-0-393-09040-6.
- Marx, Karl; Engels, Friedrich (1973). Institut für Marxismus-Leninismus beim ZK der SED (ed.). Werke (PDF) (in German). Vol. 6. Berlin: Dietz Verlag. OCLC 900771901. Archived (PDF) from the original on 2025-03-19.
- Mehring, Franz (1962). Karl Marx: The Story of His Life. Translated by Fitzgerald, Edward. Ann Arbor: University of Michigan Press (Ann Arbor paperback). OCLC 609847695.
- Thomas, Alex M. (2019-02-19). "Reading Marx's Wage-Labour and Capital". Archived from the original on 2025-04-18. (see also this page)
- Vygodski, Vitaly (1973). The Story of a Great Discovery : How Karl Marx wrote "Capital". Translated by Christopher S.V. Salt. Berlin: Verlag Die Wirtschaft. (first published in Russian in 1965; see also: The Story of a Great Discovery in the Marxist Internet Archive)
