= Frederick Marks =

Frederick Marks may refer to:

- Fred Marks (1868–1952), English cricketer
- Frederick W. Marks (1940–2025), American historian and Catholic apologist
- Freddy Marks (1949–2021), musician

== See also ==
- Frederick Marx, producer / director
