= Biographies of Karl Marx =

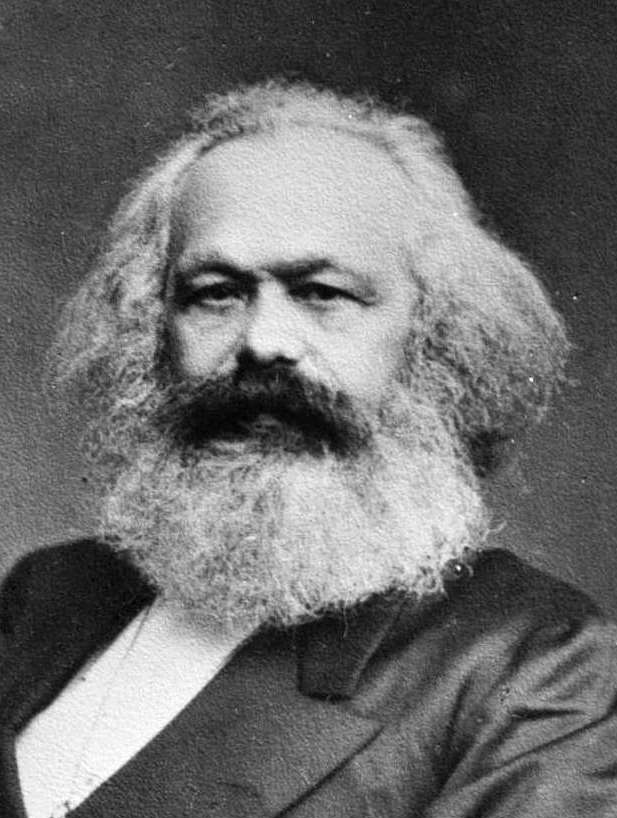
Karl Marx in 1875

This page gives an overview of biographies of Karl Marx (5 May 1818 – 14 March 1883), the German-born philosopher, economist, sociologist, journalist, and revolutionary socialist. Born in Trier to a middle-class family, he studied Hegelian philosophy, and political economy, lived in many places, like Berlin, Paris, Brussels and London, and developed a fundamental, theoretical and practical critique on industrial capitalism.

Many biographies have been written about this famous revolutionary. Until 2019, there was no overview of these biographies. In 2019 Angelo Segrillo published "Two Centuries of Karl Marx Biographies: An Overview". He points out that, although there are many books written about Marx's work and his ideas, real biographies, in the sense of studies of the life of Marx, are much less common. And of course it is difficult to separate the life and the work. The so-called "intellectual biographies" (of which the 1939 book of Isaiah Berlin is the best example), describe (shortly) the life of the thinker, but have a primary focus on the development of his ideas.

The American political scientist Eubanks, in his Karl Marx and Friedrich Engels : An Analytical Bibliography (first edition 1977; second edition 1984) has a paragraph on 'The Biographers of Marx and Engels'. He gives a general introduction to the problem of biographies of Marx (and Engels):

1. First, "some familiarity with the ideas of Marx and/or Engels is essential to an understanding of their personal and political life." (p. xxxvi) This is not always the case, and often the biographies are personal, sometimes political, but seldom intellectual. Although this is not unreasonable, "it would be useful if more of the biographers exhibited at least a nodding acquaintance with the philosophical views of their subject." (p. xxxvii).
2. Marx and Engels laid the foundation of Marxism. Consequently, an objective analysis of their lives and achievements has become highly unlikely. Some biographies 'are excessively sympathetic, bordering on the hagiographical, while others tend toward an exorcism rite, treating Marx or Engels as demons of the modern world." (p. xxxvii).
3. Finally, Eubanks notes a significant lack of descriptions of the lives of Marx and Engels together.

He then mentions some "sympathetic reviews of Marx's life" and gives a rather exotic selection of "four interesting, readable and reasonably adequate accounts: Heinrich Gemkow et al., Karl Marx: A Biography; Arnold Kettle, Karl Marx; Karl Korsch, Karl Marx; and John Lewis, The Life and Teaching of Karl Marx" (p. xxxvii). Then follows a rather complete overview of biographies, starting with Liebknecht (1896) and ending with McLellan (1973).

== Wilhelm Liebknecht (1896)—Karl Marx: Biographical Memoirs ==
In 1896 Wilhelm Liebknecht, a friend of Karl Marx, and a founder of the Social Democratic Party of Germany (SPD) published Karl Marx, zum Gedächtniß. Ein Lebensabriß und Erinnerungen (In memory of Karl Marx. Biography and memoirs). It was translated in English in 1901 as Karl Marx: Biographical Memoirs by Ernest Untermann. The English translation was reprinted in 1906 and 1908. A Dutch translation appeared in 1909.

== John Spargo (1910)—Karl Marx: His Life and Work ==
First published in Manchester and New York in 1910, Karl Marx: His Life and Work by John Spargo is one of the first comprehensive biographies of Marx. It was republished in a revised edition in 1912. The book was reprinted in 2003. It was translated into German in 1912.

== Franz Mehring (1918)—Karl Marx: The Story of His Life ==
Originally published in German in 1918 as Karl Marx. Geschichte seines Lebens, written by Franz Mehring, a German historian and translated in English in 1935 by Edward Fitzgerald as Karl Marx: The Story of His Life. During a large part of the twentieth century this book was considered the classical biography of Marx. The work has been translated into many languages, including Russian (1920), Dutch (1921), Danish (1922), Hungarian (1925), Japanese (1930) and Spanish (1932).

== Otto Rühle (1928)—Karl Marx: His Life and Work ==
Karl Marx: Leben und Werk was written by Otto Rühle and first published in German in 1928. An English translation by Eden and Cedar Paul was published under the title Karl Marx: His Life and Work (419 pages). The work was republished several times, also as an e-book. It was reviewed several times in 1929 and later, most of the time with a generally positive tone.

== Boris Nicolaievsky (1933)—Marx: Man and Fighter ==
Marx: Man and Fighter is a biography by Boris Nicolaievsky, first published in German in 1933. It was translated into English by Otto Mänchen-Helfen and published in 1936. Some subsequent English editions restore the notes, appendices, and bibliography omitted from the first English edition. This biography focuses largely on Marx as a revolutionary, not as a philosopher or social scientist/economist. In the 'Foreword' we find the memorable sentence: "Perhaps one Socialist in a thousand has ever read any of Marx's economic writings, and of a thousand anti-Marxists not even one."

This biography was reviewed several times, for instance by Harold Lasswell in 1937, and in 1976, after the 1973 republication, by Duncan Hallas.

== Karl Korsch (1938)—Karl Marx ==
This important book sometimes is considered one of the (intellectual) biographies, but it is mostly seen as an interpretation of Marx's thoughts. It was originally published as part of a series "Modern Sociologists". It was reissued 1963 and published in original German version in 1967. Translations appeared in Italian, French, Spanish and Greek. It was reissued many times, for instance in a digital edition in 2016.

== Isaiah Berlin (1939)—Karl Marx: His Life and Environment ==
Karl Marx: His Life and Environment is a 1939 intellectual biography of Karl Marx by Isaiah Berlin. It was republished five times, the last time in 2013.

Berlin argues that Marx's system of thought depends upon indefensible metaphysical presuppositions.

== David McLellan (1973)—Karl Marx: His Life and Thought ==
Karl Marx: His Life and Thought is a 1973 biography of Karl Marx by political scientist David McLellan. The work was republished as Karl Marx: A Biography in 1995.

== Maximilien Rubel (1975)—Marx without Myth ==
Marx Without Myth: A Chronological Study of his Life and Work by Maximilien Rubel

== Rolf Hosfeld (2009)—Karl Marx: An intellectual biography ==
Karl Marx: An intellectual biography was written by Rolf Hosfeld and first published in German in 2009 as Die Geister, die er rief: eine neue Karl-Marx-Biographie. The translation in English by Bernard Heise appeared in 2013.

== Francis Wheen (2010)—Karl Marx ==
External videos
- Booknotes interview with Wheen on Karl Marx: A Life, 25 June 2000, C-SPAN

Karl Marx is a 2010 biography by journalist Francis Wheen.

== Jonathan Sperber (2013)—Karl Marx: A Nineteenth Century Life ==
Karl Marx: A Nineteenth Century Life is a 2013 biography of Karl Marx by Jonathan Sperber.

== Gareth Stedman-Jones (2016)—Karl Marx: Greatness and Illusion ==
Karl Marx: Greatness and Illusion is a 2016 biography of Karl Marx by British historian Gareth Stedman-Jones.

== Michael Heinrich (2018)—Karl Marx and the Birth of Modern Society ==
Karl Marx and the Birth of Modern Society: The Life of Marx and the Development of His Work. Volume I: 1818-1841 is a 2019 (German edition 2018) biography by German political scientist Michael Heinrich which cites the new Marx-Engels-Gesamtausgabe (MEGA) and dispells some of the myths in previous biographies contradicted by new published material in MEGA.

== Minor works ==
- Friedrich Engels (1892)—Karl Marx
- Keir Hardie (1910)—Marx: The Man and His Message
- Vladimir Lenin (1914)—Karl Marx: A Brief Biographical Sketch With an Exposition of Marxism
- Heinrich Gemkow (1968)—Karl Marx
- Maximilien Rubel (1980)—Marx: Life and Works (registration required). New York: Macmillan.

== See also ==
- Karl Marx in film

== Sources ==
- Eubanks, Cecil L. (2015). Karl Marx and Friedrich Engels: An Analytical Bibliography. Routledge Library Editions: Marxism. London; New York: Routledge. doi:10.4324/9781315715285. ISBN 978 1 138 88554 7.
- Segrillo, Angelo (March 2019). "Two Centuries of Karl Marx Biographies: An Overview" (PDF). LEA Working Paper Series 4. Sao Paulo: Laboratório de Estudos da Ásia (LEA), History Department, University of São Paulo.
