= Karl Marx: The Story of His Life =

1918 book by Franz Mehring

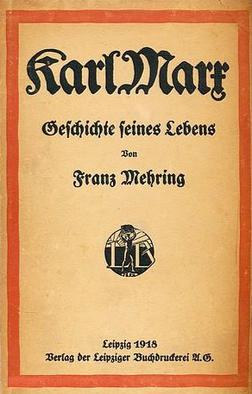
- Cover of the first edition
- Author: Franz Mehring
- Original title: Karl Marx. Geschichte seines Lebens
- Translator: Edward Fitzgerald
- Language: German
- Subject: Karl Marx
- Published: 1918 (in German); 1935 (Covici, Friede, Inc, in English)
- Publication place: Germany
- Media type: Print (Hardcover and Paperback)
- Pages: 608 (English edition)
- ISBN: 978-0415607261
- Website: transcription of the 1935 edition at marxists.org

Karl Marx: The Story of His Life (German: Karl Marx. Geschichte seines Lebens) is a 1918 book about the philosopher, economist and revolutionary Karl Marx by the German historian Franz Mehring. Considered the classical biography of Marx for a long time, the work has been translated into many languages, including Russian (1920), Dutch (1921), Swedish (1921–1922), Danish (1922), Hungarian (1925), Japanese (1930), Spanish (1932), English (1935), Hebrew (1940–1941), Slovenian (1974), Turkish (2012).

== Bibliographical information ==
The first edition, in German, was published in 1918:

- Mehring, Franz (1918). Karl Marx. Geschichte seines Leben (in German). Leipzig: Verlag der Leipziger Buchdruckerei A.G. OCLC 1080878402 (all editions).

First English editions:

- Mehring, Franz (1935). Karl Marx. The story of his life. Translated by Fitzgerald, Edward. New York: Covici, Friede. OCLC 943172502.
- Mehring, Franz (1936). Karl Marx. The story of his life. Translated by Fitzgerald, Edward. London: The Bodley Head. OCLC 86153600.

There were several later English editions, e.g.

- Mehring, Franz (1962). Karl Marx. The story of his life. Translated by Fitzgerald, Edward. Ann Arbor: University of Michigan Press (Ann Arbor paperback). OCLC 609847695. (with an introduction by Max Shachtman). In this edition the work has 575 pages (including the index).
- Mehring, Franz (2003). Karl Marx. The story of his life. Translated by Fitzgerald, Edward. London & New York: Routledge. ISBN 978 0 415 31333 9.

== Contents ==
The book has, dependent on the edition, some introductions and prefaces, and a total of fifteen chapters:

1. 'Early years' (p. 1), in which Marx's first years in Trier are described, his entrance at the University of Bonn, and his friendship and engagement with Jenny von Westphalen;
2. 'A pupil of Hegel' (p. 9), in which Marx moves to Berlin (1836), to study jurisprudence, but mainly history and philosophy; contacts with Young Hegelians (Bruno Bauer); doctoral dissertation (Jena, 1841); journalist for the Rheinische Zeitung; influence of Ludwig Feuerbach; marriage;
3. 'Exile in Paris' (p. 58), with the publication of the only issue of Deutsch-Französische Jahrbücher (1844);
4. 'Friedrich Engels' (p. 88), where Marx and Friedrich Engels meet in Paris, and start a lifelong coöperation with the writing of The Holy Family, in which they criticize the Young Hegelians;
5. 'Exile in Brussels' (p. 109), in which the Marx family moves to Brussels, Marx and Engels write The German Ideology—which was not published before 1932—, Marx writes The Poverty of Philosophy—a critique of Pierre-Joseph Proudhon—, Marx and Engels participate in the foundation of the Communist League and write The Communist Manifesto;
6. 'Revolution and counterrevolution' (p. 152): the revolution year 1848, with the publication of the daily newspaper Neue Rheinische Zeitung (new rhenish newspaper) in Cologne, from June 1848 to May 1849;
7. 'Exile in London' (p. 191), with Marx's move to London in June 1849, where he would stay for the rest of his life, and beginning a period of extreme poverty for Marx and his family; the publication of six issues of the Neue Rheinische Zeitung as a monthly magazine, the collapse of the Communist League, scientific research in the British Museum and work as a journalist for the New-York Daily Tribune;
8. 'Marx and Engels' (p. 225), in which the two personalities and their alliance are described
9. 'The Crimean War and the crisis' (p. 238): from the end of 1853 Marx was not involved in political activities and continued his work as a journalist for the American newspaper; he devoted much of his time to the study of classical economists; this finally led to the publication of A Contribution to the Critique of Political Economy in 1859;
10. 'Dynastic changes' (p. 265): while in Europe important political changes took place, Marx's work for the New York Daily Tribune came to an end; he wrote a book in which Carl Vogt was criticized (1860); this chapter of Mehring's biography also contains much information on the relation between Marx and Engels and Ferdinand Lassalle;
11. 'The early years of the International' (p. 316), with the foundation of the International Workingmen's Association, often named the First International, in 1864; Marx became seriously involved, contributed the Inaugural Address (that ended with the same words as the Communist Manifesto: "Workers of the World, Unite!") and the Address of the International Working Men's Association to Abraham Lincoln in 1864, attended several conferences of the new organization and in 1865 read an address entitled Value, Price and Profit;
12. '"Das Kapital"' (p. 357): at two o'clock in the morning of the 16th August 1867 Marx wrote to Engels that he had finished correcting the last printer's sheets of the "damned book", that had cost him so many years and the sacrifice of his health, happiness and family to write; it was, of course, only the first volume, and the publication of the second and third volume would only take place after his death, but this volume contained the core of his theory of surplus value and capital accumulation; the book received some good criticisms; the first translation appeared in Russia in 1872 and a French translation started to appear in parts in that same year;
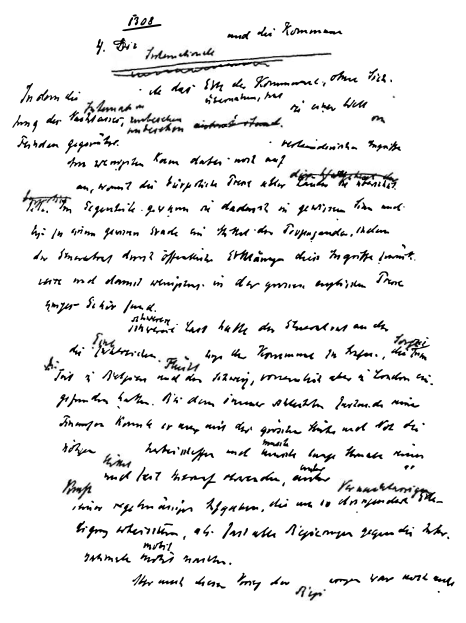
  Manuscript page of Mehring's Karl Marx
13. 'The International at its zenith' (p. 387): meanwhile the International grew and held its congresses, in Lausanne (1867), in Brussels (1868) and in Basel (1869), but at the same time the first controversies between Marx and Mikhail Bakunin developed;
14. 'The decline of the International' (p. 435): the year 1870 marked a period of important changes in Western Europe: Napoleon III was defeated and the Second French Empire came to an end; the foundations for the German Empire were laid by William I, King of Prussia and his minister president Otto von Bismarck; in 1871 the Paris Commune lived its short life and Marx wrote The Civil War in France; the First International was threatened by powerful negative external influences, lost the support of the British trade unions, and the conflict between Marx and Bakoenin sharpened; other conflicts within the First International also intensified and on the Hague congress of 1872 the decision was made to move the General Council to New York and to expulse Bakunin and his supporter James Guillaume; soon after the organization was dismantled in Europe;
15. 'The last decade' (p. 501): after 1873 Marx did no longer take an active part in any organization; his health deteriorated; contacts with German social-democrats where largely maintained by Friedrich Engels; Marx contributed his Critique of the Gotha Program in 1875; on December 2, 1881, his wife Jenny Marx died, leaving Marx behind in very bad health, mentally and physical; the sudden death, on January 11, 1883, of his daughter Jenny was the decisive blow; March 14 "the Moor" died.

== Reception ==
In Books Abroad of spring 1936 a short review of the English translation is given. The book is said to be a "monumental and noble biography of the man most hated and admired today." Mehring is praised for not hesitating "to take his stand against Marx in certain controversies."

In 1937 Harris wrote a review of the first English edition of Karl Marx. The Story of his Life in Science & Society. He refers to some earlier biographies of Marx in English language, like that of D. Riazanov (Karl Marx and Friedrich Engels. New York 1927), of Otto Rühle (Karl Marx, his Life and Work. New York 1929, translated by E. and C. Paul), and of Edward H. Carr (A Study in Fanaticism. London 1934), but states that "none can dispute first rank with Mehring's". He remarks that the biography is at his best in the period prior to 1848. Despite the merits of the book, it fails to satisfy Harris' expectations. "Mehring, though a doughty fighter against the distortions of Marxism of the center and right wing of the German Social Democratic Party, even to the point of breaking with them to help found the Communist Party of Germany, was nevertheless unable to free himself entirely from the influence of the ideas against which he fought."

The political scientist David McLellan writes that Karl Marx: The Story of His Life is the "classical biography of Marx", adding that it is now "slightly hagiographical" and out of date. In 1953, the philosopher Louis Althusser wrote that it is the "most comprehensive and interesting historical study of Marx".

== See also ==
- Biographies of Karl Marx

== Sources ==
- Harris, Mark (Winter 1937). "Review [of Karl Marx. The Story of His Life (and two other biographies of Friedrich Engels)]". Science & Society. 1 (2): 256–260.
- McLellan, David (1995). Karl Marx: A Biography. London: Papermac. ISBN 0-333-63947-2.
