= The Young Hegelians and Karl Marx =

- Cover of the 1980 Macmillan Press edition
- Author: David McLellan
- Language: English
- Subject: Karl Marx
- Publisher: Macmillan Publishers
- Publication date: 1969
- Publication place: United Kingdom
- Media type: Print (Hardcover and Paperback)
- Pages: 170
- ISBN: 978-0333087886

The Young Hegelians and Karl Marx is a 1969 book by the political scientist David McLellan.

== Summary ==
McLellan examines the transformations of Georg Wilhelm Friedrich Hegel's thought by the Young Hegelians, and the influence of their social and political views on Karl Marx.
