= Fred Marks =

English cricketer

Personal information
- Full name: Frederick David Marks
- Batting: Right-handed
- Bowling: Right-arm fast

Domestic team information
- Years: Team
- 1884: Somerset
- Only First-class: 7 August 1884 Somerset v Hampshire

Career statistics
Competition	First-class
Matches	1
Runs scored	2
Batting average	2.00
100s/50s	0/0
Top score	2
Balls bowled	8
Wickets	0
Bowling average	–
5 wickets in innings	0
10 wickets in match	0
Best bowling	0/3
Catches/stumpings	0/–
- Source: ESPNcricinfo, 9 July 2011

Frederic David Marks (21 June 1868 – 6 May 1952) was an English first-class cricketer who played one match for Somerset County Cricket Club in 1884.
