= Eleanor Marx: A Life =

Book

- Author: Rachel Holmes
- Language: English
- Subject: Eleanor Marx
- Published: London
- Publisher: Bloomsbury Publishing
- Publication date: 2014
- Publication place: United Kingdom
- Pages: 508
- ISBN: 9781408852897
- Dewey Decimal: 335.4092

Eleanor Marx: A Life is a 2014 book by the British author Rachel Holmes, published by Bloomsbury Publishing.

== Synopsis ==
The book profiles the life of Eleanor Marx, a feminist and socialist campaigner and daughter of Karl Marx. The book deals with Marx's life as a labour organiser, personal secretary and researcher for her father, activist at the "epicentre of British socialism", and a trailblazing feminist campaigner.

Holmes also dwells at length on the discrepancy between Eleanor Marx being a militant Feminist in the public sphere, standing up for the rights of women in general and of exploited women workers in particular, and assertively confronting any sexist attitude which she encountered in the Socialist and trade union movement - and her private life where she was unable to get out of an unhappy 14-years long relationship with con man Edward Aveling, who cheated her, stole her money and finally either drove her to suicide or actually murdered her (Holmes is inclined to the second possibility).

== Reception ==
In The Guardian Kathryn Hughes wrote that "Not only is the story of British socialism messy to tell, it is also difficult to make sing. But Holmes throws her ebullient prose at all those committee meetings, managing to make us see why each speech, each pamphlet, and each internecine quarrel actually matters in the long run. The result is a biography that, paradoxically, is most illuminating when it leaves the world of bungled private lives behind and steps out smartly on to the public stage" Lisa Jardine, reviewing the biography for the Financial Times, praised the author for "giving back to us an unforgettable Eleanor Marx"

In May 2014, the book was featured as the Book of the Week on BBC Radio 4.
