= Karl Marx: His Life and Environment =

1939 book by Isaiah Berlin

- Cover of the 1959 edition
- Author: Isaiah Berlin
- Language: English
- Subject: Karl Marx
- Publisher: Thornton Butterworth
- Publication date: 1939
- Publication place: United Kingdom
- Media type: Print (hardcover and paperback)
- Pages: 222 (1995 edition)
- ISBN: 978-0195103267

Karl Marx: His Life and Environment is a 1939 intellectual biography of the philosopher, social scientist, economist and revolutionary Karl Marx by the historian of ideas Isaiah Berlin.

In a 1995 interview with Michael Ignatieff, first broadcast on BBC Two in November 1997, after his death, Berlin described how he came to write the book:

When I was first asked to do it…I read far more Marx that will ever be good for anyone else to read again…. He was pompous, heavy, highly intelligent, made heavy German jokes, quite good, rather a bully, of a rather impressive kind. You felt you were in the presence of an intellectually powerful figure who wanted to dictate to one, didn’t terribly want to know what one thought, wanted you to know what he thought.

The book charts the chief phases of Marx’ life, and renders his ideas ‘with a sympathetic grasp both of it subject’s motives and his limitations’.

The book had five English editions and was translated in many languages, among which German (1959), Italian (1967), Dutch (1968) and Spanish (1973).

== Reception ==
The historian Peter Gay wrote that Karl Marx: His Life and Environment is one of the best discussions of alienation in the literature on Marx and Georg Wilhelm Friedrich Hegel, and among such accounts, distinguished by its lucidity. Berlin's style of writing has been praised by the political scientist David McLellan, and the philosopher John Gray.

== Editions in English ==
Some editions of this book in English, includes reprints are these:

- "Karl Marx: His Life and Environment". Berlin, Isaiah. Thornton Butterworth [Home University Library]. 1st Edition, 1939. London, Great Britain. pp: 256.
- "Karl Marx: His Life and Environment". Berlin, Isaiah. Oxford University Press. 2nd Edition, 1948. pp: 280.
  - "Karl Marx: His Life and Environment". Berlin, Isaiah. Oxford University Press. 2nd Edition, 1948 [reprint: The Camelot Press Ltd., 1949]. London, Great Britain. pp: 280.
  - "Karl Marx: His Life and Environment". Berlin, Isaiah. Oxford University Press [Galaxy Books]. 1st Edition, 1959. pp: 280.
  - "Karl Marx: His Life and Environment". Berlin, Isaiah. Oxford University Press [Galaxy Books]. 2. Edition, 2nd Printing [with additions], 1960. New York, USA. pp: 280.
- "Karl Marx: His Life and Environment". Berlin, Isaiah. Oxford University Press. 3rd Edition, 1963. New York, USA. pp: 295.
  - "Karl Marx: His Life and Environment". Berlin, Isaiah.; Ross, Norman P. (Editor's Preface).; Heilbroner, Robert L. (Introduction). Time Inc. 3rd Edition [Time Reading Program Special Edition, reprint of 1963 Oxford Edition]. 1963. New York, USA. pp: 246.
  - "Karl Marx: His Life and Environment". Berlin, Isaiah. Oxford University Press [Galaxy Books]. 3rd Edition, 1963 [reprint: 1972]. New York, USA.
  - "Karl Marx: His Life and Environment". Berlin, Isaiah. Oxford University Press. 3rd Edition, 1963 [reprint: 1976]. New York, USA.
- "Karl Marx: His Life and Environment". Berlin, Isaiah. Oxford University Press [Opus Books]. 4th edition, 1978. New York, USA.
  - "Karl Marx: His Life and Environment". Berlin, Isaiah.; Ryan, Alan (Foreword).; Carver, Terrel (Guide to Further Reading). Oxford University Press. 4th Edition, 2nd Printing. 1996. New York, USA. pp: 228.
- "Karl Marx". Berlin, Isaiah. Fontana Press. 5th Revised Edition, 1995. London, Great Britain. pp: 256.
- "Karl Marx". Berlin, Isaiah.; Henry, Hardy (ed.).; Ryan, Alan (Foreword).; Carver, Terrel (Afterword, Guide to Further Reading). Princeton University Press. 5th Edition [Henry, Hardy (ed.)], 2013. New Jersey, USA. pp: 311.
