= Angelo Segrillo =

Brazilian historian

Angelo de Oliveira Segrillo (born October 4, 1958) is a Brazilian historian specialized in Russia and in comparative studies of Russia, the West and Brazil. He holds a B.A. from Missouri State University, a master's degree from the Pushkin Institute (Moscow, Russia) and a doctorate from Universidade Federal Fluminense (Brazil). He is an associate professor of history at the University of São Paulo.

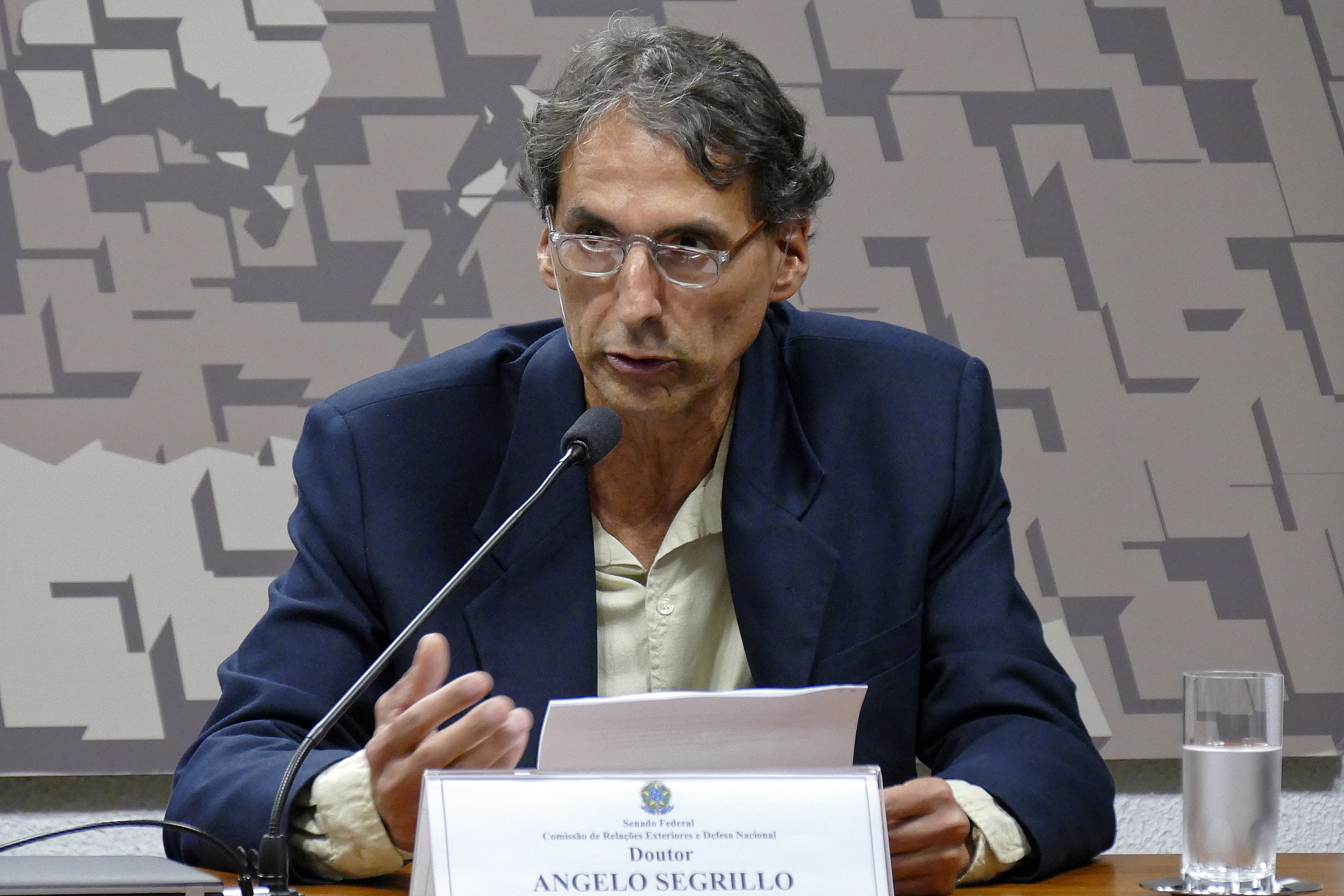

Segrillo's doctoral dissertation — published under the title O Declínio da URSS: um estudo das causas (“The Decline of the USSR: a study of its causes”) — was the first major Brazilian academic work using first-hand research into the formerly classified Soviet files. He analyzed the decline of the Soviet economy in its last decades not as a purely internal process, but as accompanying (and associated with) the changes in the world economy, which was moving from Fordist to Post-Fordist paradigms. The rigid, vertically oriented Soviet system had been competitive with the West in the decades when the (similarly rigid, vertically oriented) Fordism was paramount. However, when flexible post-Fordist paradigms (such as Toyotism) came along and set new rules for the game, the USSR started having problems of adaptation to these new requirements of flexibility. An abridged version of this argument can be seen in English in a short essay titled The Decline of the Soviet Union.

Notable among other books written by Angelo Segrillo in Portuguese are Rússia e Brasil em Comparação (“Russia and Brazil in Comparison”, a comparative analysis of Russian and Brazilian political parties in the process of democratization since 1985) and Rússia: Europa ou Ásia (“Russia: Europe or Asia?”, about the debates between Westernizers, Slavophiles and Eurasianists and how these identity questions shape Russia´s foreign policy today between East and West).

Among his works in the English language, Professor Segrillo proposed a new index to measure political and economic democracy in his 2012 article, Liberalism, Marxism and Democratic Theory Revisited: Proposal of a Joint Index of Political and Economic Democracy. He also presented the first complete translation into English of Peter the Great´s original Table of Ranks in a 2016 paper. In 2020, three of the main books by A. Segrillo were translated into English: The Decline of the Soviet Union: An Analysis of the Causes, Russia: Europe or Asia?, and Karl Marx’s “Capital” (Vols. 1, 2, 3) Abridged.

== Selected bibliography ==
In English

- The Decline of the Soviet Union: An Analysis of the Causes. São Paulo: FFLCH/USP, 2020.
- Russia: Europe or Asia? The Question of Russia’s Identity in the Discussions between Westernizers, Slavophiles and Eurasianists and an Analysis of the Consequences in Present-Day Russia. São Paulo: FFLCH/USP, 2020.
- Karl Marx’s “Capital” (Vols. 1, 2, 3) Abridged. São Paulo: FFLCH/USP, 2020.
- The Decline of the Soviet Union: A Hypothesis on Industrial Paradigms, Technological Revolutions and the Roots of Perestroika. LEA Working Paper Series, no. 2, December 2016.
- Segrillo, Angelo (2012). "Liberalism, Marxism and Democratic Theory Revisited: Proposal of a Joint Index of Political and Economic Democracy". Brazilian Political Science Review. 6 (2): 8–27. doi:10.1590/S1981-38212012000200001.
- A First Complete Translation into English of Peter the Great´s Original Table of Ranks: Observations on the Occurrence of a Black Hole in the Translation of Russian Historical Documents. LEA Working Paper Series, no. 1, November 2016.

In Russian

- Osobennosty Ekonomicheskogo Rasvitiya SSSR v Period NTR. Alternativy, no. 2, pp. 157–161, 1999.
- Ontologiya i Ideal Sotsializma pri Lenine, Trotskom i Staline: tri spornykh voprosa. In: Abramson, I.G. et al. (eds.) Sotsialisticheskii Ideal i Real´nyi Sotsialism: Lenin, Trotskii, Stalin. Moscow: LENAND, 2011.
- Demokratizatsiya v Rossii i Brazilii: Sravnitel'nyi Analiz. Alternativy, no. 4, pp. 131–139, 2010.

In French

- Occidentalisme, Slavophilie et Eurasianisme: Les Intellectuels et lês Homes Politiques à la Recherche de L´indentité Russe. In: Modernités Nationales, Modernités Importées: entre Ancien et Nouveau Monde XIXe-XXIe Siècle (org. Denis Rolland & Daniel Aarão Reis). Paris: L´Harmattan, 2012.
- Le Système Soviétique et la Modernité : quantifier la démocratie économique comme la démocratie libérale pour tenter un bilan comparatif. In: Modernités Alternatives: L´historien face aux discours et représentations de la modernité (org. Denis Rolland & Daniel Aarão Reis). Paris : L´Harmattan, 2009.

In Portuguese

- Rússia: Europa ou Ásia? A questão da identidade russa nos debates entre ocidentalistas, eslavófilos e eurasianistas e suas consequências hoje na política da Rússia entre Ocidente e Oriente. Curitiba: Prismas, 2016.
- De Gorbachev a Putin: a saga da Rússia do socialismo ao capitalismo. Curitiba: Prismas, 2015.
- Ásia e Europa em Comparação Histórica: o debate entre eurocentrismo e asiocentrismo na história econômica comparada de Ásia e Europa. Curitiba: Prismas, 2014.
- Os Russos. São Paulo: Contexto, 2012.
- Rússia e Brasil em Transformação: uma breve história dos partidos russos e brasileiros na democratização política. Rio de Janeiro: 7Letras, 2005.
- Herdeiros de Lenin: a história dos partidos comunistas na Rússia pós-soviética. Rio de Janeiro: 7Letras, 2003.
- O Declínio da URSS: um estudo das causas. Rio de Janeiro: Record, 2000 (2nd edition: Prismas, 2013).
