= Karl Marx: His Life and Thought =

1973 book by David McLellan

- Cover of the first edition
- Author: David McLellan
- Language: English
- Subject: Karl Marx
- Publisher: Macmillan Publishers
- Publication date: 1973
- Publication place: United Kingdom
- Media type: Print (Hardcover and Paperback)
- Pages: 464 (1995 edition)
- ISBN: 978-0-333-44541-9

Karl Marx: His Life and Thought is a 1973 biography of Karl Marx by the political scientist David McLellan. The work was republished as Karl Marx: A Biography in 1995.

== Bibliographic information ==
First edition published in London and New York:

- McLellan, David (1973a). Karl Marx: His Life and Thoughts. London etc.: MacMillan Press.
- McLellan, David (1973b). Karl Marx: His Life and Thoughts. New York etc.: Harper & Row.

These editions were republished several times, in different forms, also as an e-book (after the MacMillan 1973 edition).

In 1995 a republication appeared under a different name:

- McLellan, David (1995). Karl Marx : A Biography. Basingstoke and London: MacMillan Press Ltd. ISBN 0 333 66543 0. This new (third) edition contains a short postscript: 'Marx Today', in which McLellan describes how the events of the twentieth century shaped the view of Marx; apart from that the bibliography was brought up to date.

In 1975 McLellan also wrote a much more condensed biography of Karl Marx, of 88 pages, with the simple title Marx. This work was reprinted many times (12 times between 1975 and 1988).

== Background ==
The first generally known and complete biography of Karl Marx was written by Franz Mehring, and published, first in German as Karl Marx. Geschichte seines Leben (Karl Marx: The Story of His Life) in 1918.

It would take fifty-five years, before the next really important biography of Marx was written. This was Karl Marx : His Life and Thoughts by McLellan (1973). "What Mehring's biography had been for the first half of the twentieth century — the standard thus far — McLellan’s was for the second half (and probably even today)."

== Summary ==
McLellan deals with Marx's intellectual, political and private life.

== Reception ==
The political theorist Terrell Carver described the book as, "The most comprehensive scholarly account of Marx's life and works". The historian of science Roger Smith called it "readable and reliable".

== See also ==
- Biographies of Karl Marx
