= Frederick W. Marks =

American historian and Catholic apologist (1940–2025)

Frederick W. Marks III (November 13, 1940 – January 16, 2025) was an American historian and Catholic apologist. As a scholar, he wrote and taught extensively on American diplomatic history. As a proponent of Roman Catholicism, he published dozens of articles and tracts and spoke extensively in public.

== Education and teaching ==
Marks attended Loyola High School in New York City, and attained his B.A. from the College of the Holy Cross in 1962 and his Ph.D. from the University of Michigan in 1968. His doctoral dissertation, "The Impact of Foreign Affairs on the United States Constitution, 1783–1788," was supervised by Bradford Perkins. Other members of the doctoral committee were Professors Samuel J. Eldersveld, Shaw Livermore Jr., and Gordon S. Wood. Marks taught at the University of Michigan from 1967 to 1968, at Purdue University from 1968 to 1973 and at St. John's University from 1974 to 1979. At St. John's, he supervised the doctoral dissertation of graduate student Daniel W. Fitz-Simons, who had been in Navy Intelligence and the DIA before teaching at the Marine Corps Command and Staff College. He was the author of four books and dozens of articles on history. His scholarly publications are characterized by multi-archival research overseas. In addition to utilizing repositories all over the United States, his work took him to Germany, France, England, Scotland, Canada, Guatemala, and the Republic of China.

In the field of Roman Catholicism, Marks wrote six books and scores of full-length articles, seventeen of which appeared in leading journals for the Catholic clergy. In addition, he published a handbook for engaged and newly married Roman Catholic couples. It was translated into Spanish and Indonesian in 2008. The last years of his writing life were devoted to the Christian view of suffering and what people perceive as failure. In a note about his death, the New Oxford Review called Marks a "biblical scholar par excellence."

== Publications ==
=== Books on diplomatic history ===
Robert W. Love Jr., diplomatic historian at the US Naval Academy, introduced Marks in 1995 by writing: "Frederick W. Marks' wide-ranging interests have resulted in important reinterpretations of the Constitutional Convention, Theodore Roosevelt's foreign policy, and John Foster Dulles and the Cold War. His Wind Over Sand revised completely our understanding of Franklin Roosevelt's statesmanship."

- Independence on Trial: Foreign Affairs and the Making of the Constitution Baton Rouge, Louisiana State University Press, 1973, (reprinted in paperback 1986), ISBN 9780807100523
- Velvet on Iron: The Diplomacy of Theodore Roosevelt Lincoln: University of Nebraska Press, 1979, (reprinted in paperback, 1982) ISBN 9780803281158, Theodore Roosevelt Specialist John Allen Gable reviewed the book in Presidential Studies Quarterly. Additionally, Edmund Morris, winner of the Pulitzer Prize for his biography of the first Roosevelt, called it "the most important book in its field since Howard K. Beale's Theodore Roosevelt and the Rise of America to World Power (1956). Indeed many readers will judge it superior to its predecessor in its elegance, brevity and courageous originality."
- Wind over Sand: The Diplomacy of Franklin Roosevelt Athens: University of Georgia Press 1988, (reprinted in paperback 1991) ISBN 9780820312705. Roosevelt specialist Frank Freidel of Harvard University described Wind over Sand as a "devastating revisionist critique of Franklin D. Roosevelt's foreign policy" that would challenge future scholars while Max Lerner predicted, in the Wall Street Journal, that it would "relight the fires of controversy in Rooseveltology and leave the arena of battle distinctly changed." The book was chosen as a selection by the Conservative Book Club and the Lawyer's Book Society.
- Power and Peace: The Diplomacy of John Foster Dulles Westport, Conn.: Praeger, 1993, ISBN 9780275944971 (reprinted in paperback 1995) ISBN 9780275944971.

=== Religious Books ===
- A Catholic Handbook for Engaged and Newly Married Couples (1994, reprinted in 1997 and 1999, ISBN 9781880033142).
- A Brief for Belief: The Case for Catholicism (1999, ISBN 1579181147)
- The Gift of Pain (2012, ISBN 9781937155322)
- Think and Believe (2012, ISBN 9781937155377)
- Confessions of a Catholic Street Evangelist (2017, ISBN 9781940777702)
- Pro-life Champion: The Untold Story of Monsignor Philip J. Reilly and His Helpers of God's Precious Infants (2017, ISBN 1545234973)

== Personal life ==
Marks was married for over fifty years to Sylvia Marks, who holds a Ph.D. degree from Princeton University and teaches English at New York University's Polytechnic Institute. He died in 2025 at the age of 84.
