= Franz Mehring =

German communist historian, philosopher, and politician (1846–1919)

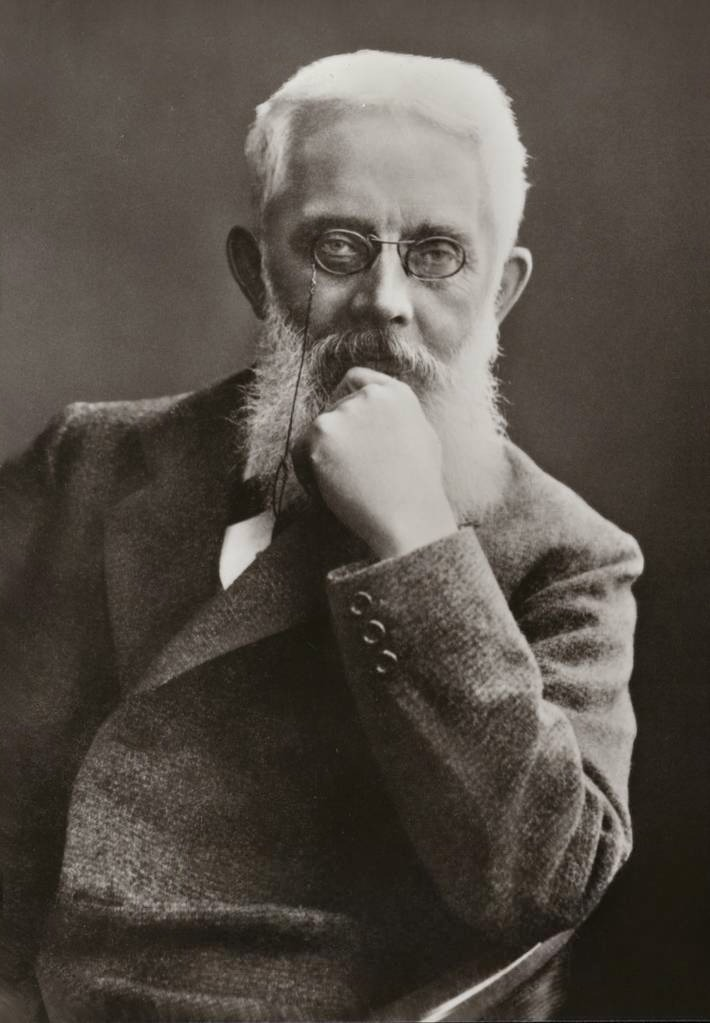
- Mehring c. 1915
- Born: 27 February 1846; Schlawe, Pomerania, Prussia (today Sławno, Poland)
- Died: 28 January 1919 (aged 72); Berlin, Germany
- Education: Leipzig University
- Occupations: Journalist, historian, philosopher, literary critic

Franz Erdmann Mehring (27 February 1846 – 28 January 1919) was a German communist historian, literary and art critic, philosopher, and revolutionary socialist politician who was a senior member of the Spartacus League during the German Revolution of 1918–1919. He authored Karl Marx: The Story of His Life (1918), which was long considered the classical biography of Marx.

== Biography ==
=== Early years ===
Mehring was born 27 February 1846 in Schlawe, Pomerania, the son of a retired military officer and senior tax official. He studied classical philology at the University of Leipzig and received his doctorate in 1882 with the dissertation: "The German social democracy, their history and their teaching".

=== Political career ===
Mehring worked for various daily and weekly newspapers and over many years wrote lead articles for the weekly magazine Die Neue Zeit.

He was initially a supporter of liberal democratic ideals and allied himself with the national-liberal camp, however after being acquainted with working-class leaders such as August Bebel and Wilhelm Liebknecht Mehring gradually moved towards socialism.

In 1868, Mehring moved to Berlin to study and worked in the editorial office of the Die Zukunft newspaper.

From 1871 to 1874, Mehring worked for the Correspondence Office in Oldenburg, writing reports on sessions of the Reichstag and the local parliament. He became a well-known parliamentary reporter, working for the Frankfurter Zeitung newspaper and Die Waage, a newspaper published by Leopold Sonnemann.

From time to time Mehring spoke in support of the labor movement, his views were initially close to Ferdinand Lassalle. In 1880, Mehring began to study the works of Karl Marx.

Mehring left Die Waage after an argument with Sonnemann and in 1884 became chief editor of the Berliner Volks-Zeitung newspaper. He spoke out against Otto von Bismarck’s Anti-Socialist Laws, although he still was at the time himself close to liberal parties. In 1891, Mehring joined the Social Democratic Party of Germany (SPD).

In 1893, Mehring was the recipient of a letter from Friedrich Engels, in which the latter first wrote the phrase False consciousness.

Between 1902 and 1907, Mehring was the chief editor of the Social Democratic Leipziger Volkszeitung newspaper.

From 1906 to 1911, Mehring taught at the SPD's party school and was a member of the Prussian parliament from 1917 to 1918.

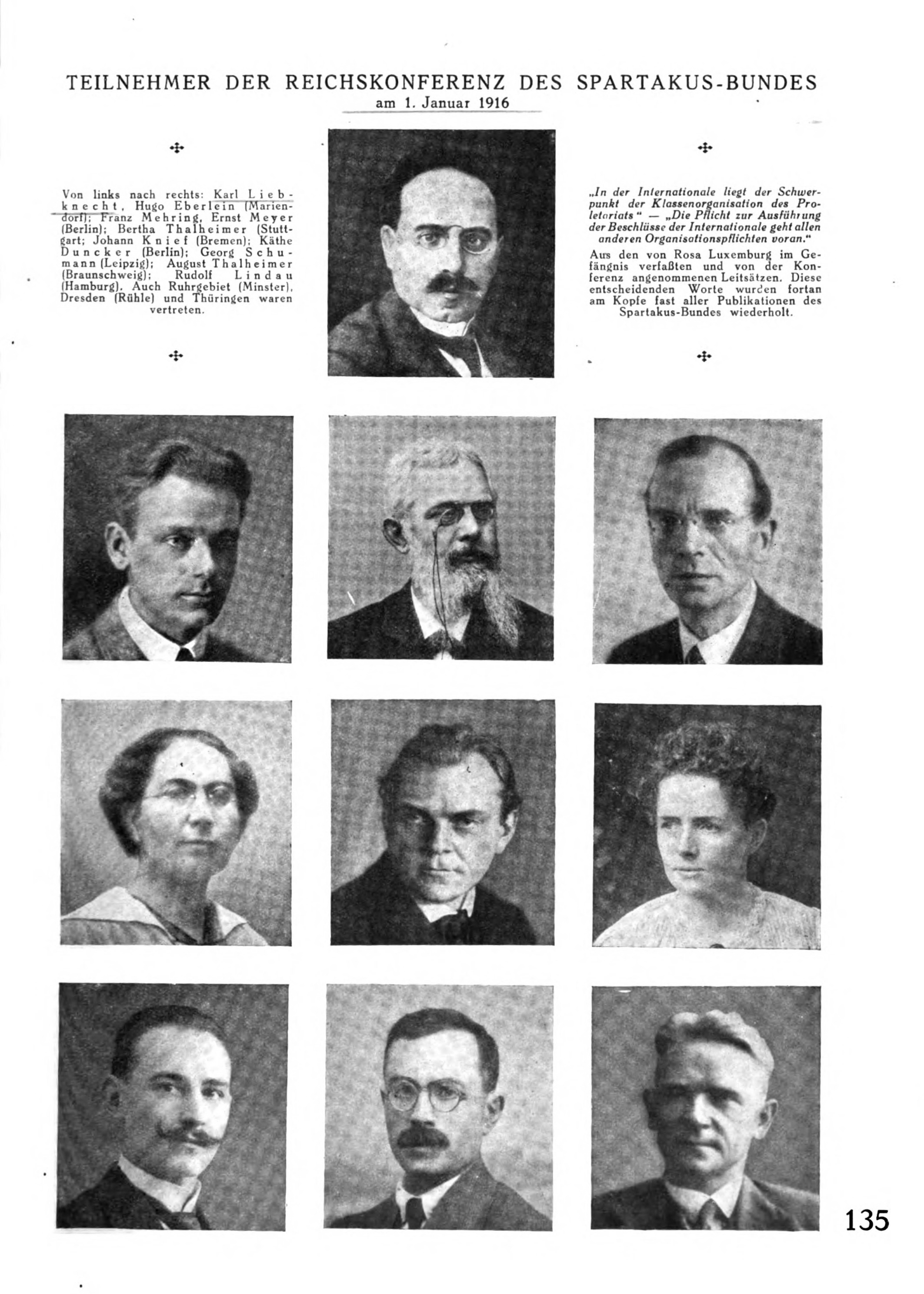
Mehring (second row, center) among participants of the Reich Conference of the Spartacus League, 1 January 1916

During World War I, Mehring began to distance himself from the SPD, along with other members who believed the party was abandoning its Socialist Agenda by passing a bill to send more troops to war. In 1916, the left-wing Marxist revolutionary Spartacus League was founded and Mehring was one of its main leaders alongside Karl Liebknecht and Rosa Luxemburg.

Mehring was sympathetic to the Bolshevik organization in Russia and to the cause of the October Revolution.

Mehring wrote a Marxist analysis of the actions of King Gustavus Adolphus of Sweden which rejected the official explanation of the Thirty Years' War as having been rooted in religion, arguing instead that the economic and social interests of various classes were the actual spurs to action. After "long and irritating delays owing to the military censorship" (according to the English translator Edward Fitzgerald, 1935 U.S. edition), Mehring's Karl Marx: The Story of His Life was published in 1918. The classical biography of Marx, it was dedicated to fellow Spartacist Clara Zetkin. The book was later translated into many languages, including Russian (1920), Swedish (1921–1922), Danish (1922), Hungarian (1925), Japanese (1930), Spanish (1932), and English (1935).

=== Death and legacy ===
Already in ill health, Mehring was deeply affected by the death of his comrades Rosa Luxemburg and Karl Liebknecht in January 1919. He died just under two weeks later on 28 January 1919 in Berlin at the age of 73. His grave now forms part of the Memorial to the Socialists (German: Gedenkstätte der Sozialisten) in the Friedrichsfelde Central Cemetery, Berlin.

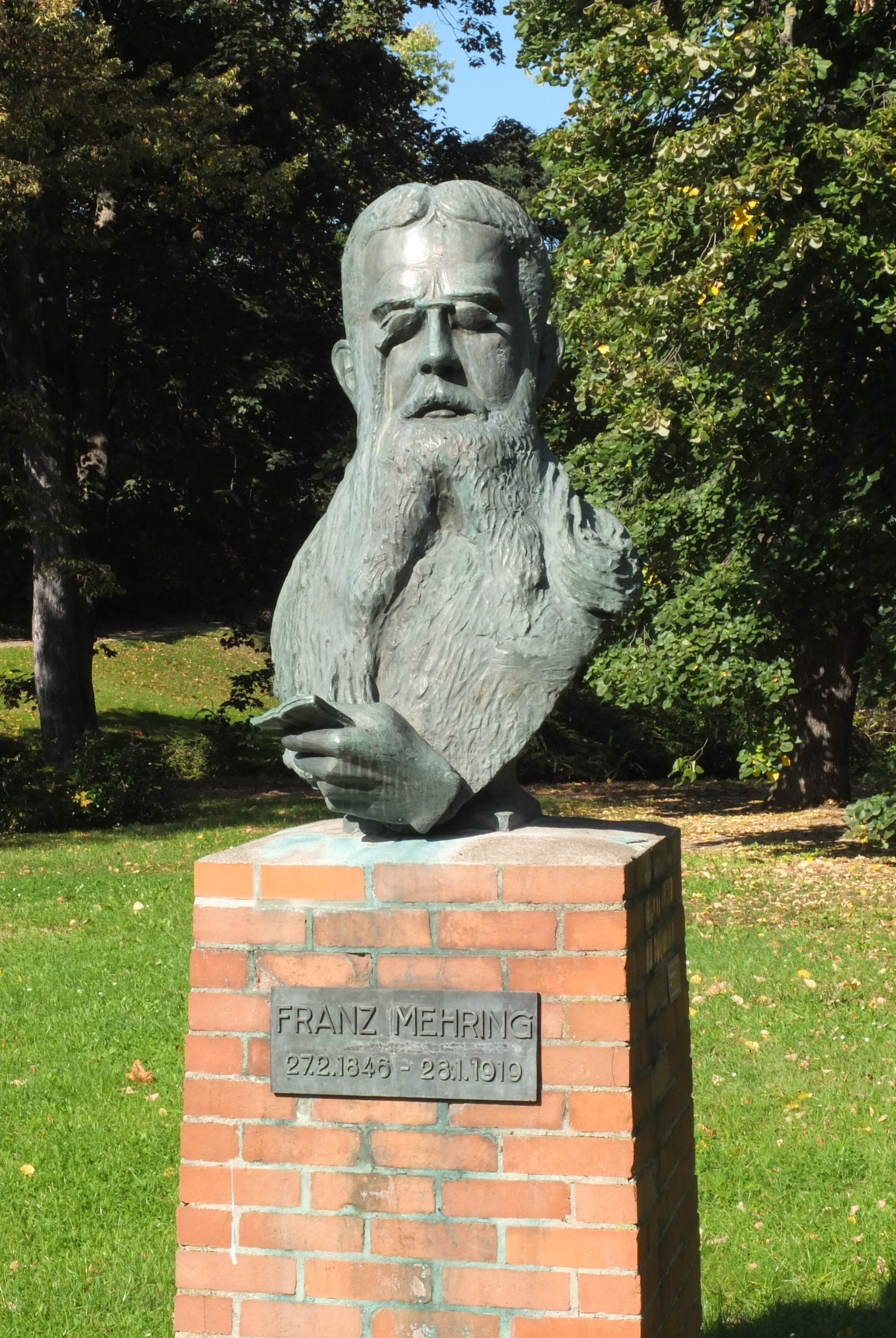
Bust of Franz Mehring

Mehring's papers reside as fond 201 at the Russian Center for Preservation and Research of Modern Historical Documents (RCChIDNI) in Moscow. This material is also available for use by scholars on three reels of microfilm, with permission required by the center before extensive extracts may be published. Mehringdamm, Mehringplatz, and the NVA Air Force Officer's Academy that was located in Kamenz were all named after him.

The International Committee of the Fourth International, a Trotskyist organization which holds the Spartacists in high esteem and claims an ideological connection to them, honors Mehring by calling their publishing branch Mehring Books.
