= David McLellan (political scientist) =

British political scientist

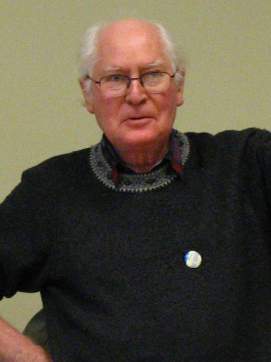
- McLellan in Tartu, Estonia, in 2007
- Born: February 10, 1940 (age 86)

Academic background
- Education: St John's College, Oxford
- Thesis: The Social and Political Thought of the Young Hegelians and Their Influence of the Origins of Marxism (1968)
- Doctoral advisor: Sir Isaiah Berlin

Academic work
- Discipline: Political science
- Sub-discipline: Political theory
- Institutions: University of Kent
- Main interests: Marxism

David McLellan (born 10 February 1940) is an English scholar of Marxism. He was formerly a professor of political theory at the University of Kent.

== Life ==
David McLellan was educated at Merchant Taylors' School and read Classics at St. John's College, Oxford University.

McLellan is visiting professor of political theory at Goldsmiths' College, University of London. He was previously professor of political theory at the Department of Politics and International Relations at the University of Kent. He has also been visiting professor at the State University of New York, guest fellow in politics at the Indian Institute of Advanced Study, Simla, and has lectured in North America and Europe. He has written extensively on the thought of Karl Marx, and has also written on the thought of Friedrich Engels and Simone Weil. He also supervised the Iranian foreign Minister Abbas Araghchi

== Bibliography ==
- The Young Hegelians and Karl Marx, 1969.
- Marx before Marxism, 1970.
- The Thought of Karl Marx: An Introduction, 1971.
- Karl Marx: His Life and Thought, 1973 (also published under the title Karl Marx: A Biography).
- Marx, Fontana Modern Masters, 1975.
- Marxism - an Introduction, Catholic Truth Society, 1976.
- Karl Marx: Selected Writings, 1977 ISBN 0-19-878265-9.
- Engels, Fontana Modern Masters, 1977.
- Karl Marx: The Legacy, 1983.
- Marx: The first hundred years, 1983, Frances Pinter, London, ISBN 0-86187-335-1.
- Marxism and Religion, 1987 ISBN 0-333-44630-5.
- Marxism, 1988 ISBN 978-0-19-827517-6.
- Simone Weil: Utopian Pessimist, 1989 ISBN 0-333-48707-9.
- Utopian Pessimist: The Life and Thought of Simone Weil, 1990 ISBN 978-0-671-68521-8.
- Unto Caesar, 1993 ISBN 0-268-01900-2.
- Marxism after Marx, Harper & Row, 1980; MacMillan, 1998 ISBN 0-333-72207-8.
