= List of American political memoirs =

The following is a bibliography of non-presidential U.S. political memoirs. Many of them were written by the stated author and one or more ghostwriters.

== U.S. Supreme Court ==
- The Majesty of the Law : Reflections of a Supreme Court Justice (2003; ISBN 0-375-50925-9), by Sandra Day O'Connor, 102nd U.S. Supreme Court Justice, 1981–2006
- Thurgood Marshall: His Speeches, Writings, Arguments, Opinions and Reminiscences (2001; ISBN 1-55652-386-6), by Thurgood Marshall, U.S. Supreme Court Justice, 1967–1991
- My Beloved World (2003; ISBN 978-0-307-59488-4), by Sonia Sotomayor, U.S. Supreme Court Justice, 2009–Present
- Lovely One : A Memoir (2024; ISBN 978-0-593-72990-8) by Ketanji Brown Jackson, U.S. Supreme Court Justice, 2022-Present

== U.S. Cabinet ==
=== Secretary of State ===
- Never Give an Inch: Fighting for the America I Love (2023) by Mike Pompeo, Secretary of State under Trump, 2018-2021
- Every Day Is Extra (2018), by John Kerry, Secretary of State under President Obama 2013–2017
- Hard Choices (2014), by Hillary Rodham Clinton, Secretary of State under President Obama 2009–2013
- No Higher Honor: A Memoir of My Years in Washington (2011; ISBN 978-0-307-58786-2) by Condoleezza Rice, Secretary of State 2005–2009 and Assistant to the President for National Security Affairs 2001–2005
- Madam Secretary: A Memoir (2003), by Madeleine Albright, Secretary of State under President Bill Clinton, 1997–2001
- Chances of a Lifetime (2001), by Warren Christopher, Secretary of State under President Bill Clinton, 1993–1997
- In the Stream of History: Shaping Foreign Policy for a New Era (1998), by Warren Christopher, Secretary of State under President Bill Clinton, 1993–1997
- The Politics of Diplomacy: Revolution, War and Peace, 1989–1992 (1995; ISBN 0-399-14087-5), by James A. Baker, Secretary of State under President George H. W. Bush, 1989–1992
- Turmoil and Triumph: My Years as Secretary of State (1993; ISBN 0-684-19325-6), by George P. Shultz, Secretary of State under President Ronald Reagan, 1982–1989
- Inner Circles: How America Changed The World (1992), by Alexander Haig, Secretary of State under President Ronald Reagan, 1981–1982, and White House Chief of Staff under President Richard Nixon, 1973–1974
- Hard Choices: Critical Years in America's Foreign Policy (1983), by Cyrus Vance, Secretary of State under President Jimmy Carter, 1977–1981
- Crisis: The Anatomy of Two Major Foreign Policy Crises (2003), by Henry Kissinger, Secretary of State under Presidents Richard Nixon and Gerald Ford, 1973–1977
- Ending the Vietnam War : A History of America's Involvement in and Extrication from the Vietnam War (2002), by Henry Kissinger, Secretary of State under Presidents Richard Nixon and Gerald Ford, 1973–1977
- Years of Renewal (2000), by Henry Kissinger, Secretary of State under Presidents Richard Nixon and Gerald Ford, 1973–1977
- Years of Upheaval (1982), by Henry Kissinger, Secretary of State under Presidents Richard Nixon and Gerald Ford, 1973–1977
- The White House Years (1979) by Henry Kissinger, Secretary of State under Presidents Richard Nixon and Gerald Ford, 1973–1977
- As I Saw It (1990), by Dean Rusk, Secretary of State under Presidents John F. Kennedy and Lyndon B. Johnson, 1961–1969
- Present at the Creation: My Years in the State Department (1969), by Dean Acheson, Secretary of State under President Harry Truman, 1949–1953
- All in One Lifetime (1958), by James F. Byrnes, Secretary of State under President Harry Truman, 1945–1947
- Speaking Frankly (1947), by James F. Byrnes, Secretary of State under President Harry Truman, 1945–1947
- Roosevelt and the Russians (1949), by Edward Stettinius Jr., Secretary of State under President Franklin D. Roosevelt, 1944–1945 (partial memoirs about the Yalta conference)
- The Memoirs of Cordell Hull (1948; ASIN B0006D7AEA), by Cordell Hull, Secretary of State under President Franklin D. Roosevelt, 1933–1944
- On Active Service in Peace and War (1947), by Henry L. Stimson, Secretary of State under President Herbert Hoover, 1929–1933 (also covers positions other than Secretary of State held by the author)
- The Far Eastern Crisis (1936), by Henry L. Stimson, Secretary of State under President Herbert Hoover, 1929–1933
- The Big Four and Others of the Peace Conference (1921), by Robert Lansing, Secretary of State under President Woodrow Wilson, 1915–1920
- The Peace Negotiations: A Personal Narrative (1921), by Robert Lansing, Secretary of State under President Woodrow Wilson, 1915–1920
- War Memoirs (1935), by Robert Lansing, Secretary of State under President Woodrow Wilson, 1915–1920
- Memoirs (1925), by William Jennings Bryan, Secretary of State under President Woodrow Wilson, 1913–1915 (also covers positions other than Secretary of State held by the author)

=== Secretary of the Treasury ===
- Stress Test: Reflections on Financial Crises (2014), by Timothy F. Geithner, Secretary of the Treasury under President Barack Obama, 2009–2013
- Dealing with China: An Insider Unmasks the New Economic Superpower (2015), by Henry Paulson, Secretary of the Treasury under President George W. Bush, 2006–2009
- On the Brink: Inside the Race to Stop the Collapse of the Global Financial System (2010), by Henry Paulson, Secretary of the Treasury under President George W. Bush, 2006–2009
- In an Uncertain World: Tough Choices from Wall Street to Washington (2003), by Robert E. Rubin, Secretary of the Treasury under President Bill Clinton, 1995–1999
- In History's Shadow: An American Odyssey (1993), by John Connally, former Secretary of the Treasury under President Richard Nixon, and Mickey Herskowitz
- For the Record: From Wall Street to Washington (1988), by Donald Regan, Secretary of the Treasury, 1981–1985, and White House Chief of Staff, 1985–1987, under President Ronald Reagan

=== Secretary of Defense ===
- A Sacred Oath: Memoirs of a Secretary of Defense During Extraordinary Times (2022; ISBN 978-0063144316), by Mark Esper, Secretary of Defense 2019–2020.
- Duty: Memoirs of a Secretary at War (2014), by Robert Gates, Secretary of Defense 2006–2011.
- Worthy Fights: A Memoir of Leadership in War and Peace (2014; ISBN 978-1594205965) by Leon Panetta, Secretary of Defense 2011–2013, Director of the CIA 2009–2011, White House Chief of Staff 1994–1997, Director of the OMB 1993–1994, Congressman 1977–1993.
- Star Spangled Security: Applying Lessons Learned over Six Decades Safeguarding America (2012; ISBN 978-0815723820) by Harold Brown, Secretary of Defense 1977–1981, and Joyce Winslow.
- Known and Unknown: A Memoir (2011; ISBN 978-1-59523-067-6) by Donald Rumsfeld, Secretary of Defense 1975–1977 and 2001–2006.
- Fighting for Peace: Seven Critical Years in the Pentagon (1990), by Caspar W. Weinberger, Secretary of Defense 1981–1987.
- The Essence of Security: Reflections in Office (1968), by Robert McNamara, Secretary of Defense 1961–1968.

=== Other Cabinet positions ===
- Thirteenth Man: A Reagan Cabinet Memoir (1988), by Terrel H. Bell, Secretary of Education under President Ronald Reagan
- Advising Ike : The Memoirs of Attorney General Herbert Brownell (1993; ISBN 0-7006-0590-8), by Herbert Brownell, Attorney General under President Dwight D. Eisenhower, 1953–1957, and John P. Burke
- Inside: A Public and Private Life (2004), by Joseph A. Califano, Secretary of Health, Education, and Welfare under President Jimmy Carter
- Arthur Flemming, Crusader at Large: A Memoir (1991; ISBN 0-9628363-2-X), by Bernice Flemming; Arthur Flemming: Secretary of Health, Education, and Welfare under President Dwight D. Eisenhower
- Justice: The Memoirs of Attorney General Richard Kleindienst (1985; ISBN 0-915463-15-6), by Richard Kleindienst, Attorney General under President Richard Nixon, 1972–1973
- Locked in the Cabinet (1997; ISBN 0-375-40064-8), by Robert Reich, Secretary of Labor under President Bill Clinton
- Law and Justice in the Reagan Administration: The Memoirs of an Attorney General (1991; ISBN 0-8179-9172-7), by William French Smith, U.S. Attorney General under President Ronald Reagan, 1981–1985
- The Terrors of Justice: The Untold Side of Watergate (1985), by Maurice Stans, Secretary of Commerce under President Richard Nixon

== U.S. Cabinet-level administration offices ==
=== Administrator of the Environmental Protection Agency ===
- Politics, Pollution and Pandas: An Environmental Memoir (2003), by Russell E. Train, Administrator of the Environmental Protection Agency, 1973–1978

=== Director of the Office of Management and Budget ===
- The Triumph of Politics: Why the Reagan revolution failed (1986), by David Alan Stockman, Director of the Office of Management and Budget under President Ronald Reagan

=== White House Chief of Staff ===
(For the former White House Chiefs of Staff who served in a more senior position, see above)

- The Haldeman Diaries: Inside the Nixon White House (1994), by H.R. Haldeman, White House Chief of Staff under President Richard Nixon
- Crisis: The Last Year of the Carter Presidency (1982), by Hamilton Jordan, White House Chief of Staff under President Jimmy Carter
- No Such Thing as a Bad Day: A Memoir (2001), by Hamilton Jordan, White House Chief of Staff under President Jimmy Carter
- Chief of Staff: Lyndon Johnson and His Presidency (2004), by W. Marvin Watson, White House Chief of Staff under President Lyndon B. Johnson

== U.S. ambassadors ==
- The United States in Honduras, 1980–1981: An Ambassador's Memoir (2000; ISBN 0-7864-0734-4), by Jack R. Binns, Ambassador to Honduras, 1980–1981
- Rogue Ambassador: An African Memoir (1997; ISBN 0-918769-39-6) by Smith Hempstone, Ambassador to Kenya, 1989–1993
- Madame Ambassador: The Shoemaker's Daughter (2002; ISBN 1-931010-04-8), by Mari-Luci Jaramillo, Ambassador to Honduras, 1977–1980
- American Diplomacy in Turkey: Memoirs of an Ambassador Extraordinary and Plenipotentiary (1984; ISBN 0-275-91274-4), by James W. Spain, Ambassador to Turkey, 1980–1981
- The Politics of Truth: Inside the Lies That Put the White House On Trial and Betrayed My Wife's CIA Identity: A Diplomat's Memoir (2004; New York: Carroll & Graf, 2005; ISBN 0-7867-1551-0), by Joseph C. Wilson, IV, Ambassador to Gabon and São Tomé and Príncipe, 1992–1995

== Heads of federal agencies (sub-cabinet level) ==
- At the Center of the Storm : My Years at the CIA (2007; ISBN 978-0-06-114778-4), by George Tenet and Bill Harlow, Director of Central Intelligence 1997–2004
- My FBI : Bringing Down the Mafia, Investigating Bill Clinton, and Fighting the War on Terror (2005; ISBN 0-312-32189-9), by Louis J. Freeh, Director of the Federal Bureau of Investigation 1993–2001
- Full Faith and Credit: The Great S & L Debacle and Other Washington Sagas (2000; ISBN 1-893122-49-2), by L. William Seidman, FDIC/RTC chairman under Presidents Ronald Reagan and George H. W. Bush
- From the Shadows: The Ultimate Insider's Story of Five Presidents and How They Won the Cold War (1996/2007; ISBN 978-0684810812) by Robert Gates, Director of Central Intelligence 1991–1993
- Command of the Seas (1989/2001; ISBN 1-55750-534-9) by John Lehman, Secretary of the Navy 1981–1987
- The Craft of Intelligence (1963; ISBN 1-59228-297-0), by Allen W. Dulles, Director of Central Intelligence 1953–1961

== White House staff positions ==
- The Clinton Wars (2003), by Sidney Blumenthal, former advisor to President Bill Clinton
- Nerve Center: Inside the White House Situation Room (2003), by Michael K. Bohn, former director of the Situation Room
- Against All Enemies: Inside America's War on Terror (2004; ISBN 0-399-15294-6), by Richard A. Clarke, former National Security Council counterterrorism advisor
- Truth To Tell: Tell It Early, Tell It All, Tell It Yourself: Notes from My White House Education (2002), by Lanny J. Davis, Special Counsel to the President during Bill Clinton’s second term (1996–1998) and currently a member of the Privacy and Civil Liberties Board under President George W. Bush
- Taking Heat: The President, the Press, and My Years in the White House (2005), by Ari Fleischer, former White House Press Secretary for President George W. Bush, 2001–2003
- Eyewitness to Power: The Essence of Leadership Nixon to Clinton (2003), by David Gergen, former advisor to Presidents Richard Nixon, Gerald Ford, Ronald Reagan, and Bill Clinton
- White House Daze: The Unmaking of Domestic Policy in the Bush Years (1998), by Charles Kolb, Assistant Deputy for Domestic Policy under President George H. W. Bush
- A Political Education: A Washington Memoir (1972) by Harry McPherson, Special Counsel to President Lyndon B. Johnson
- Behind the Oval Office: Getting Reelected Against All Odds (1998), by Dick Morris, former political strategist to President Bill Clinton
- What I Saw at the Revolution: A Political Life in the Reagan Era (1990), by Peggy Noonan, former speechwriter for Presidents Ronald Reagan and George H. W. Bush
- The Ring of Power: The White House Staff and its Expanding Role in Government (1988), by Bradley H. Patterson, Jr., former White House staff member under Presidents Dwight D. Eisenhower, Richard Nixon, and Gerald Ford
- The White House Staff: Inside the West Wing and Beyond (2000) by Bradley H. Patterson, Jr., former White House staff member under Presidents Dwight D. Eisenhower, Richard Nixon, and Gerald Ford
- All Too Human: A Political Education (1999; ISBN 0-316-92919-0), by George Stephanopoulos, senior advisor to President Bill Clinton
- POTUS Speaks: Finding the Words that Defined the Clinton Presidency (2000; ISBN 0-7432-0020-9), by Michael Waldman, former speechwriter to President Bill Clinton
- The Greatest Communicator: What Ronald Reagan Taught Me About Politics, Leadership, and Life (2005; ISBN 0-471-73648-1), by Dick Wirthlin, former chief political strategist for President Ronald Reagan, and Wynton C. Hall
- Remembering America: a voice from the sixties (1988) by Richard N. Goodwin, a speechwriter for John F. Kennedy, and Lyndon Bains Johnson. Also part of Robert Kennedy's and Eugene McCarthy's campaigns in 1968.
- The World As It Is: A Memoir of the Obama White House (2019) by Ben Rhodes, deputy national security advisor to President Barack Obama, overseeing the administration's national security communications, speechwriting, public diplomacy, and global engagement programming, 2009–17

== Miscellaneous ==
- All's Fair: Love, War and Running for President (1994; ISBN 0-679-43103-9), by James Carville, former campaign strategist for Bill Clinton, and Mary Matalin, former campaign director for George H. W. Bush, with Peter Knobler
- Straight from the Heart: My Life in Politics and Other Places (1989; ISBN 0-671-68073-0), by Ann Richards, Governor of Texas, with Peter Knobler
- A Fighting Chance, by Senator Elizabeth Warren.
- A Mayor's Life: Governing New York's Gorgeous Mosaic (2013; ISBN 978-1-61039-301-0), by David Dinkins, Mayor of New York City, with Peter Knobler
- Mayor (1984) by Ed Koch, Mayor of New York
- What a Party! My Life Among Democrats: Presidents, Candidates, Donors, Activists, Alligators, and Other Wild Animals (2007; ISBN 0-312-37775-4), by Terry McAuliffe, Governor of Virginia, with Steve Kettmann

== See also ==
- List of autobiographies by presidents of the United States
- List of memoirs by first ladies of the United States
- List of political career biographies
- U.S. representative bibliography (congressional memoirs)
- U.S. senator bibliography (congressional memoirs)
