= Ed Gallucci =

American photographer (born 1947)

Ed Gallucci (born 1947) is an American photographer currently living in South Dakota. He is the first magazine photographer to photograph Bruce Springsteen, and his work appeared on 40 covers of Newsweek in the 1970s to 1990s.

== Biography ==
Gallucci was born in the Park Slope section of Brooklyn, New York City, in 1947, the son of Italian immigrants who had migrated from the Calabria region of southern Italy to New York City. During his early years, the family moved to Berkeley Heights, New Jersey, where he attended Governor Livingston High School and was known as "the artist". After graduation he moved to Kansas City, Missouri and studied graphic design and photography at the Kansas City Art Institute, where he earned a BFA degree.

== Early work ==
In December 1972, after seeing the performer play at Kenny's Castaways club on New York's Upper East Side, Ed Gallucci took the photographs that accompanied the first interview/profile of Bruce Springsteen, in Crawdaddy magazine, written by editor-in-chief Peter Knobler. These iconic photographs, taken during band rehearsals in an unheated garage and at Springsteen's apartment in Bradley Beach, New Jersey when Springsteen was 23 years old and the E Street Band had not yet been named, have only recently been unearthed and rediscovered. Gallucci was a regular contributor to Crawdaddy, photographing Muhammad Ali, Woody Allen, Jerry Garcia, Paul Simon, Al Green, Blood, Sweat & Tears, Stevie Wonder, Robert Altman, John Cassavetes and many others for the magazine. His work also appeared in Rolling Stone, Penthouse, and Playboy.

== Gallucci Studio, Inc. ==
After exhibiting his work at Grey Advertising in the late 1970s, Gallucci was encouraged to make the switch from editorial to commercial studio photography. Gallucci Studio Inc. was established in Manhattan and occupied four different addresses between 1978 and 1998. Under these auspices Gallucci shot hundreds of magazine spreads and covers for: Newsweek, Business Week, Fortune, U.S. News & World Report, Discover, Longevity, New York Magazine, PC Magazine, Psychology Today, Science, Video Review, Weight Watchers, and Family Health magazines. Thousands of Gallucci's photographs have appeared on print ads, billboards, book covers, annual reports, catalogs, and brochures. His work appeared internationally in Photo-Graphis for seven consecutive years. From 1979 to 1993, while on assignment with the magazine's cover department, Gallucci's work was published on over 40 Newsweek covers

== Exhibits ==
Photos from Gallucci's Frames Between Fares collection were on exhibit in the O. Winston Link Museum in Roanoke, VA. The show opening was July 25, 2014. Similar to O. Winston Link, Gallucci grew up in Brooklyn, NY and found himself in Southwest Virginia.

Photos from Gallucci's Bruce Springsteen collection were on exhibit (May 26, 2016 through June 19, 2016) at the Grammy Museum as part of the Los Angeles traveling show, documenting the early days of Bruce Springsteen's career. The show opened at the Woody Guthrie Center in Tulsa, Oklahoma in April 2014 and will be displayed in museums throughout the country for two years. Other photographers in the show include, Danny Clinch, Eric Meola, Barry Scheier, Frank Stefanko, Pamela Springsteen.

The Grammy Museum "Bruce Springsteen: A Photographic Journey" traveling show was on exhibit at the Morven Museum and Garden in Princeton, NJ November 18, 2016 - May 21, 2017 which features photos from Ed Gallucci's Bruce Springsteen collection.

Six of Gallucci's photographs have been accepted into the permanent collection of the prestigious Brooklyn Museum of Art.

Gallucci was one of five photographers whose works were featured at a special exhibition, "Thinking Photography: Five Decades at the Kansas City Art Institute" at the Nelson-Atkins Museum of Art, where his work is also exhibited in the museum's permanent collection.

Monmouth University in Monmouth, NJ hosts a permanent collection featuring 36 of Gallucci's photographs. In 2012, Gallucci and Crawdaddy magazine editor Peter Knobler lectured in conjunction with a special show, "Ed Gallucci - The Crawdaddy Years and Beyond" at Monmouth University's Pollak Gallery. The university also featured Gallucci's photographs in "Bruce Springsteen: A Photographic Journey" at its Rechnitz Hall exhibit from September 8 through December 22, 2015.

"The Crawdaddy Years and Beyond” photographs were also exhibited at the Sumter County Cultural Commission in Sumter, SC during the months of April and May 2016.

Gallucci was honored to have one of his photographs of legendary musician Eubie Blake selected for exhibit at the National Museum of African American History and Culture

One of Ed Gallucci's Bruce Springsteen Photographs is a part of the permanent display for the “NYU Clive Davis Exhibit” at NYU TISCH

== Film ==
Ed Gallucci's iconic Bruce Springsteen photographs are featured in the movie “A Man and his Music”, The Clive Davis Story.

Gallucci's photographs of Chicago blues musician Paul Butterfield are featured in the film “Horn From the Heart”, The Paul Butterfield Story, premiering April 21, 2017 at the Newport Beach Film Festival in Newport Beach, CA.

One of Ed's photographs of Bruce Springsteen is featured in Springsteen's film Western Stars, opening October 25, 2019.

== Awards ==
Gallucci has won over 100 advertising industry awards for his photography, including five Andys and two Clios.

== Books ==
- Hard Corps, Michael Grumley, Ed Gallucci (1977) E.P. Dutton, ISBN 0-525-47457-9
