= John Tirman =

American academic (1949 – 2022)

- Born: December 13, 1949; Bluffton, Indiana, U.S.
- Died: August 19, 2022 (aged 72)
- Education: Indiana University (BA); Boston University (MA, PhD)
- Occupations: Writer, research scientist, executive director at the MIT Center for International Studies (CIS)

John Tirman (December 13, 1949 – August 19, 2022) was an American political theorist and scholar. He was executive director and principal research scientist at the MIT Center for International Studies at the time of his death. There he led the Persian Gulf Initiative, which conducted research on Iraq war mortality, U.S.-Iran relations, and other projects. He authored or co-authored 13 books on international affairs, many of them exploring and advocating the “human security” paradigm in global affairs. He frequently contributed to AlterNet, The Huffington Post, and The Boston Globe.

== Education and early career ==
Tirman was educated at Indiana University (B.A., 1972) and earned a doctorate at Boston University, where he specialized in political theory with Howard Zinn, Frances Fox Piven, Murray Levin, and Alasdair MacIntyre.

Tirman worked at Time magazine and the Union of Concerned Scientists (UCS). At UCS, he began working on international security issues, mentored by Henry W. Kendall, the chair of UCS and a professor of physics at MIT. Kendall later was co-recipient of the Nobel Prize in physics.

Tirman edited two books on "Star Wars", the strategic defense initiative started by President Ronald Reagan. One of them, The Fallacy of Star Wars (Vintage, 1984), critiqued strategic defense and included contributions from leading scientists like Kendall, Hans Bethe, Victor Weisskopf, and Richard Garwin. Tirman frequently wrote on the issue for the Bulletin of the Atomic Scientists, The Nation, the Los Angeles Times, Esquire, and other publications.

Beginning in 1986, he headed the Winston Foundation for World Peace for 12 years. The charitable foundation, created by Robert Winston Scrivner, provided grants to NGOs working on nuclear disarmament and conflict prevention. He also headed the Henry P. Kendall Foundation and the CarEth Foundation in the mid- to late 1990s, and was an editor for a peace movement magazine, Nuclear Times.

== Academic career ==
In 1999, Tirman was awarded a Fulbright scholarship to work on conflict resolution in Cyprus, and produced an educational website on the conflict, "The Cyprus Conflict".

Returning from Cyprus, Tirman was appointed program director at the Social Science Research Council, a leading academic think tank, in New York in 2000. He headed the Program on Global Security and Cooperation with colleague Itty Abraham. In 2001, he opened a Washington, D.C. office for SSRC.

He moved to MIT in 2004, where his work mainly focused on U.S. policy in the Persian Gulf. He criticized the war in 2002–03 in a series of articles for AlterNet, including one that predicted a few days into the war that predicted it would become bogged down and be viewed as a failure. In 2005, Tirman commissioned the Iraq Mortality Study that was published in The Lancet in October 2006. The study, which was controversial at the time because of its high estimates of total "excess deaths" attributable to the war (~650,000), was carried out by scientists at the Johns Hopkins School of Public Health and in Iraq. Tirman wrote frequently on the topic, including articles for The Boston Globe, The Washington Post, The New York Times, AlterNet, and other publications. The one independent and peer-reviewed assessment of Iraq mortality estimates, in Conflict and Health (2008), found the Lancet-published survey to be superior to all other methods.

At MIT, Tirman also undertook several projects on U.S.-Iran relations, publishing a white paper in 2009 on a "New Approach to Iran" for the New Ideas Fund that urged greater accommodation and criticized America's militant attitudes toward Iran. He convened conferences and published on the regional dimension of the Iraq War, the role of terrorism in upsetting diplomatic relations, and the challenges of political instability in the Gulf. He brought to MIT such Iranian figures as President Mohammad Khatami, former deputy foreign minister Abbas Maleki, former reform parliamentarian Fatemeh Haghighatjoo, and dissident Akbar Ganji.

== Human security ==
After his arms control work in the 1980s, Tirman's work focused on human security, which places human communities at the center of the security discourse and planning. In 1997, he published Spoils of War: The Human Cost of America's Arms Trade (Free Press), which examined the human consequences of the United States' arms sales to Turkey to suppress the Kurdish rebellion. He was also part of an informal group of activists and intellectuals advising the Clinton administration on Turkey's human rights record in the late 1990s.

For his work on Kurdish rights, he was given a Human Rights Award by the United Nations Association of Washington, D.C. in 1998.

Tirman argued that social movements impact international security. He published this view in "How We Ended the Cold War," an essay in The Nation that has been widely cited and reproduced. He argued that the peace movement convinced the American public that the Cold War was dangerous and costly, giving Reagan “permission” to pursue détente with Soviet leader Mikhail Gorbachev. At SSRC, he explored how structural adjustment policies were a cause of instability and conflict, convening a conference and publishing on the topic, notably in the journal Development. He also addressed human security topics related to migration. After the 9/11 attacks, he convened a group of scholars to produce the volume, The Maze of Fear: Security and Migration After 9/11 (The New Press, 2004). In this and in work with Chatham House and others, he critiqued the treatment of Muslim immigrants and assailed the excesses of the “war on terrorism.” In 2009, he co-edited with Susan Martin, Women, Migration and Conflict: Breaking a Deadly Cycle (Springer), the result of an advisory project he convened on behalf of the U.N. Population Fund.

His work on Iraqi casualties continued the human security focus. In 2011, he published The Deaths of Others: The Fate of Civilians in America's Wars (Oxford University Press), which examined civilian suffering as a consequence of U.S. interventions in Korea, Indochina, Afghanistan, and Iraq. He published several short pieces on the topic, including articles in Alternet, the New York Times, the Washington Spectator, Washington Post, and Boston Review.

Tirman served as board co-chair of the Foundation for National Progress, which publishes Mother Jones magazine; U.S. chair of the Institute for War and Peace Reporting; and trustee of International Alert.

== Personal life and death ==
Tirman died from cardiac arrest on August 19, 2022, at the age of 72.

== Books by Tirman (selection) ==
- Dream Chasers: Immigration and the American Backlash 2015 ISBN 9781336215184
- The Deaths of Others: The Fate of Civilians in America's Wars 2011 ISBN 0195381211
- The Fallacy of Star Wars: Why Space Weapons Can't Protect Us 1984 ISBN 0394728947
- Maze of Fear 2004 ISBN 1565849167
- Making the Money Sing: Private Wealth and Public Power in the Search for Peace 2000 ISBN 0847699226
- Republics of Myth: National Narratives and the US-Iran Conflict (Banai, Byrne) 2022 ISBN 1421443317
- Spoils of War: The Human Cost of America's Arms Trade 1997 ISBN 0684827263
- Sovereign Acts: American Unilateralism and Global Security 1989 ISBN 0887302998
- 100 Ways America Is Screwing Up the World 2006 ISBN 0061133019
