= U.S. representative bibliography (congressional memoirs) =

Seal of U.S. House of Representatives

This is a bibliography of U.S. congressional memoirs by former and current U.S. representatives. The United States House of Representatives is one of the two houses of the United States Congress, the bicameral legislature which also includes the Senate.

The composition and powers of the House are established in Article One of the Constitution. The major power of the House is to pass federal legislation that affects the entire country, although its bills must also be passed by the Senate and further agreed to by the president before becoming law (unless both the House and Senate re-pass the legislation with a two-thirds majority in each chamber). Each state receives representation in the House in proportion to its population but is entitled to at least one representative. The total number of voting representatives is fixed by law at 435. Each representative serves for a two-year term. The Speaker of the United States House of Representatives, traditionally the leader of the majority party, is the presiding officer of the chamber, elected by the members of the House.

== Congressional memoirs ==
- Abzug, Bella (1972). Bella! Ms. Abzug Goes to Washington. New York: Saturday Review Press. ISBN 978-0-8415-0154-6.
- Albert, Carl; Danney Goble (1990). Little Giant: The Life and Times of Speaker Carl Albert. Norman: University of Oklahoma Press. ISBN 978-0-8061-2250-2.
- Altmire, Jason (2017). How Political Polarization Divided America and What We Can Do About It. Sunbury Press. ISBN 978-1620067543.
- Anderson, John B. (1972). A Congressman's Choice: Between Two Worlds. 1970. Grand Rapids, MI: Zondervan Publishing House.
- Armey, Richard K. (2003). Armey's Axioms: 40 Hard-earned Truths from Politics, Faith, and Life. Hoboken, NJ: Wiley. ISBN 978-0-471-46913-1.
- Bauman, Robert E. (1986). The Gentleman from Maryland: The Conscience of a Gay Conservative. New York: Arbor House. ISBN 0-87795-686-3.
- Bell, Alphonzo; Marc L. Weber (2002). The Bel Air Kid. Victoria, British Columbia: Trafford Publishing. ISBN 978-1-55369-378-9.
- Biggs, Jeffrey R.; Thomas S. Foley (1999). Honor in the House: Speaker Tom Foley. Foreword by Mike Mansfield. Pullman: Washington State University Press. ISBN 978-0-87422-173-2.
- Boehner, John (2021). On the House: A Washington Memoir. St. Martin’s Press. ISBN 978-1250238443.
- Boggs, Lindy (1994). Washington through a Purple Veil: Memoirs of a Southern Woman. New York: Harcourt Brace & Co. ISBN 978-0-15-193106-4.
- Bolling, Richard W. (1968). Power in the House: A History of the Leadership of the House of Representatives. New York: E.P. Dutton and Company.
- Bolling, Richard W. (1965). House Out of Order. New York: E.P. Dutton and Company.
- Bolling, Richard W.; John Bowles (1982). America's Competitive Edge: How to Get Our Country Moving Again. New York: McGraw-Hill.
- Brademas, John; Lynne P. Brown (2002). The Politics of Education: Conflict and Consensus on Capitol Hill. 1987. Norman: University of Oklahoma Press. ISBN 978-0-8061-2058-4.
- Brown, Sherrod (1999). Congress from the Inside: Observations from the Majority and the Minority. Kent, OH: Kent State University Press. ISBN 978-0-87338-676-0.
- Celler, Emanuel (1953). You Never Leave Brooklyn: The Autobiography of Emanuel Celler. New York: John Day Co.
- Chisholm, Shirley (1973). The Good Fight. New York: Harper & Row. ISBN 0-06-010764-2.
- Cheney, Liz (2023). Oath and Honor. Little, Brown and Company. ISBN 978-0316572064.
- Chisholm, Shirley (1970). Unbought and Unbossed. Boston: Houghton Mifflin. ISBN 0-395-10932-9.
- Clay, William L. (2004). Bill Clay: A Political Voice at the Grass Roots. St. Louis: Missouri Historical Society Press. ISBN 978-1-883982-52-2.
- Clay, William L. (1992). Just Permanent Interests: Black Americans in Congress 1870-1991. New York: Amistad Press, Inc. ISBN 978-1-56743-000-4.
- Coburn, Tom; John Hart (2003). Breach of Trust: How Washington Turns Outsiders Into Insiders. Nashville: WND Books. ISBN 0-7852-6220-2.
- Dellums, Ronald V.; H. Lee Halterman (2000). Lying Down with the Lions: A Public Life from the Streets of Oakland to the Halls of Power. Boston: Beacon Press. ISBN 978-0-8070-4319-6.
- Douglas, Helen Gahagan Douglas (1982). A Full Life. Garden City, NY: Doubleday. ISBN 978-0-385-11045-7.
- Edwards, Mickey (1983). Behind Enemy Lines: A Rebel in Congress Proposes a Bold New Politics for the 1980s. Chicago: Regnery Gateway. ISBN 0-89526-621-0.
- Elliott, Carl Sr.; Michael D'Orso (1992). The Cost of Courage: The Journey of an American Congressman. New York: Doubleday. ISBN 978-0-8173-1105-6.
- Ferraro, Geraldine A; Linda Bird Francke (1985). Ferraro: My Story. New York: Bantam. ISBN 978-0-553-05110-0.
- Ferraro, Geraldine A; Catherine Whitney (1998). Framing a Life: A Family Memoir. New York: Scribner. ISBN 978-0-684-85404-5.
- Fino, Paul A (1986). My Life in Politics and Public Service. Great Neck, NY: Todd & Honeywell, Inc. ISBN 978-0-89962-539-3.
- Fish, Hamilton (1991). Memoir of an American Patriot. Washington: Regnery Gateway. ISBN 0-89526-531-1.
- Ford, Gerald R (1979). A Time to Heal: The Autobiography of Gerald R. Ford. New York: Harper and Row. ISBN 978-0-06-011297-4.
- Frank, Barney (1992). Speaking Frankly: What's Wrong with the Democrats and How to Fix It. New York: Times Books. ISBN 978-0-8129-2010-9.
- Franks, Gary (1996). Searching for the Promised Land: An African American's Optimistic Odyssey. New York: Regan Books. ISBN 978-0-06-039156-0.
- Funderburk, David (1987). Pinstripes and Reds: An American Ambassador Caught Between the State Department & the Romanian Communists 1981-1985. Washington D.C.: Selous Foundation Press. ISBN 0-944273-01-7.
- Gephardt, Richard; Michael Wessel (1999). An Even Better Place: America in the 21st Century. New York: Public Affairs. ISBN 978-1-891620-16-4.
- Gingrich, Newt (1998). Lessons Learned the Hard Way, A Personal Report. New York: HarperCollins. ISBN 978-0-06-019106-1.
- Gingrich, Newt (2006). Rediscovering God in America: Reflections on the Role of Faith in Our Nation's History and Future. Nashville: Integrity Publishers. ISBN 1-59145-482-4.
- Gingrich, Newt (1995). To Renew America. New York: HarperCollins Publishers. ISBN 978-0-06-109539-9.
- Gingrich, Newt (2005). Winning the Future: A 21st Century Contract with America. Washington:D.C.: Regnery Publishing, Inc. ISBN 0-89526-042-5.
- Gunderson, Steve; Rob Morris; Bruce Bawer (1996). House and Home. New York: Dutton. ISBN 0-525-94197-5.
- Harris, Katherine (2002). Center of the Storm: Practicing Principled Leadership in Times of Crisis. Nashville, TN: WND Books. ISBN 978-0-7852-6443-9.
- Hastert, Dennis (2004). Speaker: Lessons From 30 Years in Coaching and Politics. Washington D.C.: Regnery Publishing, Inc. ISBN 978-0-89526-126-7.
- Hays, Brooks (1968). Hotbed of Tranquility; My Life in Five Worlds. New York: Macmillan. ISBN 978-1-299-12341-0.
- Hays, Brooks (1981). Politics Is My Parish: An Autobiography. Baton Rouge: Louisiana State University Press. ISBN 978-0-8071-0798-0.
- Hayworth, J. D. (2006). Whatever It Takes: Illegal Immigration, Border Security, and the War on Terror. Washington: D.C.: Regnery Publishing, Inc. ISBN 978-0-89526-028-4.
- Hébert, Felix Edward; John McMillan. (1976). Glenn R. Conrad (ed.). "Last of the Titans": The Life and Times of Congressman F. Edward Hébert of Louisiana. Lafayette: University of Southwestern Louisiana.
- Holtzman, Elizabeth; Cynthia L. Cooper (1996). "Who Said It Would be Easy?" One Woman's Life in the Political Arena. New York: Arcade Publishers. ISBN 978-1-55970-302-4.
- Johnson, Sam (1992). Captive Warrior: A Vietnam POW'S Story. College Station: Texas A&M University Press. ISBN 0-89096-496-3.
- Jordan, Barbara; Shelby Hearon. (1979). Barbara Jordan: A Self-Portrait. Garden City, NY: Doubleday. ISBN 978-0-385-13599-3.
- Kaptur, Marcy (1996). Women of Congress: A Twentieth Century Odyssey. Washington D.C.: Congressional Quarterly. ISBN 0-87187-989-1.
- Kasich, John (1998). Courage is Contagious: Ordinary People Doing Extraordinary Things to Change the Face of America. New York: Doubleday. ISBN 978-0-385-49148-8.
- Koch, Edward I. (1985). Politics. New York: Simon & Schuster. ISBN 1-4165-8519-2.
- Koch, Edward I.; William Rauch (1984). Mayor: An Autobiography. New York: Simon & Schuster.
- Lehman, William (2000). Mr. Chairman: The Journal of a Congressional Appropriator. Lanham: University Press of America. ISBN 978-0-7618-1559-4.
- Lewis, John (1998). Walking with the Wind: A Memoir of the Movement. New York: Simon & Schuster. ISBN 978-0-15-600708-5.
- Margolies-Mezvinsky, Marjorie; Feinman, Barbara (1994). A Woman's Place: The Freshman Women Who Changed the Face of Congress. New York: Crown Publishers. ISBN 978-0-517-59713-2.
- Martin, Joseph William; Robert J. Donovon (1960). My First Fifty Years in Politics. New York: McGraw-Hill.
- Mezvinsky, Edward M.; Kevin McCormally; John Greenya (1977). A Term to Remember. New York: Coward, McCann and Geoghegan, Inc. ISBN 978-0-698-10751-9.
- Miller, Clem (1962). Member of the House: Letters of a Congressman. New York: Charles Scribner's Sons.
- Molinari, Susan; Elinor Burkett (1998). Representative Mom: Balancing Budgets, Bill, and Baby in the U.S. Congress. Garden City, New York: Doubleday. ISBN 978-0-385-49220-1.
- Mfume, Kweisi; Ron Stodghill II (1996). No Free Ride: From the Mean Streets to the Mainstream. New York: One World. ISBN 978-0-679-45591-2.
- Montgomery, Gillespie V. ("Sonny"); Michael B. Ballard; Craig S. Piper (2003). Sonny Montgomery: The Veterans' Champion. Jackson: Mississippi State University Libraries. ISBN 1-57806-554-2.
- Murtha, John P.; John Plashal (2003). From Vietnam to 9/11: On the Front Lines of National Security. University Park, PA: Pennsylvania State University Press. ISBN 978-0-271-02239-0.
- O'Neill, Thomas P. Jr., ("Tip"); Gary Hymel (1993). All Politics Is Local, and Other Rules of the Game. New York: Times Books. ISBN 978-1-55850-470-7.
- O'Neill, Thomas P. Jr., ("Tip"); William Novak (1987). Man of the House; The Life and Political Memoirs of Speaker Tip O'Neill. New York: Random House. ISBN 978-0-394-55201-9.
- Pettengill, Samuel Barrett (1979). Helen M. Pettengill (ed.). My Story. Grafton, VT: H.M. Pettengill. ISBN 978-0-9602392-1-4.
- Pickle, J. J. (1997). Jake:Jake Pickle & Peggy Pickle. Austin: University of Texas Press. ISBN 0-292-76572-X.
- Pierce, Walter M. (1981). Arthur H. Bone (ed.). Oregon Cattleman-Governor-Congressman: Memoirs and Times of Walter M. Pierce. Portland: Oregon Historical Society. ISBN 978-0-87595-098-3.
- Poage, W.R. (1985). My First 85 Years. Waco, TX: Baylor University.
- Powell, Adam Clayton Jr. (1971). Adam by Adam: The Autobiography of Adam Clayton Powell, Jr. New York: Dial Press. ISBN 978-0-7582-0195-9.
- Price, David (2004). The Congressional Experience: A View From the Hill. Boulder, Colo: Westview Press. ISBN 978-0-8133-1157-9.
- Reuss, Henry S. (1999). When Government Was Good: Memories of a Life in Politics. Madison: University of Wisconsin Press. ISBN 978-0-299-16190-3.
- Rhodes, John J. (1976). The Futile System: How to Unchain Congress and Make the System Work Again. Garden City, NY: EPM Publications, Inc. ISBN 978-0-914440-11-6.
- Rhodes, John J.; Dean Edwards Smith (1995). I Was There. Salt Lake City: Northwest Publishing, Inc. ISBN 0-7610-0435-1.
- Richardson, Bill (2005). Between Worlds: The Making of an American Life. New York: Putnam Adult. ISBN 0-399-15324-1.
- Riegle, Donald; Trevor Armbrister (1972). O Congress. Garden City, NY: Doubleday & Co. ISBN 978-0-385-05402-7.
- Rogan, James E. (2004). Rough Edges: My Unlikely Road from Welfare to Washington. New York: Regan Books. ISBN 978-0-06-058059-9.
- Sanders, Bernie (2002). Absolutely Absurd: The Life & Times of Bernie Sanders. Tarrytown, NY: Sleepy Hollow Press. ISBN 978-1-891928-18-5.
- Sanders, Bernie; Huck Gutman (1997). Outsider in the House. London and New York: Verso. ISBN 978-1-85984-177-8.
- Sanford, Mark (2000). The Trust Committed to Me. Washington, D.C.: U.S. Term Limits Foundation. ISBN 978-0-9638615-1-1.
- Saund, D.S. (1960). Congressman from India. New York: E.P. Dutton and Company. ISBN 81-87526-05-X.
- Scarborough, Joe (2004). Rome Wasn't Burnt in a Day: The Real Deal on How Politicians, Bureaucrats, and Other Washington Barbarians are Bankrupting America. Scranton: HarperCollins. ISBN 0-06-074985-7.
- Schroeder, Patricia Scott (1998). 24 Years of House Work – And the Place Is Still a Mess: My Life in Politics. Kansas City, MO: Andrews McMeel Pub. ISBN 978-0-8362-3707-8.
- Shuster, Bud (1983). Believing in America. New York: William Morrow and Company, Inc. ISBN 978-0-688-02494-9.
- Shuster, Bud (2005). Making the Most of Your Life! A Love Letter to My Grandchildren. Shippensburg, PA: Ragged Edge Press. ISBN 978-1-57249-371-1.
- Sikes, Bob (1984). He-Coon, the Bob Sikes Story. Pensacola, FL: Perdido Bay Press. ISBN 978-0-933776-18-0.
- Sisk, B. F. (1980). A Congressional Record: The Memoir of Bernie Sisk. Fresno, CA: Panorama West. ISBN 978-0-914330-36-3.
- Smith, Frank Ellis (1964). Congressman from Mississippi. New York: Pantheon Books.
- Smith, Neal (1996). Mr. Smith Went to Washington: From Eisenhower to Clinton. Ames: Iowa State University Press. ISBN 978-0-8138-2479-6.
- Stockman, David A. (1986). The Triumph of Politics: How the Reagan Revolution Failed. New York: Harper and Row. ISBN 0-06-015560-4.
- Tancredo, Tom (2006). In Mortal Danger: The Battle for America's Border and Security. Nashville: WND Books. ISBN 978-1-58182-527-5.
- Udall, Mo (1987). Too Funny to be President. New York: H. Holt. ISBN 0-8165-2175-1.
- Vucanovich, Barbara F.; Patricia D. Cafferata (2005). From Nevada to Congress, and Back Again. Reno: University of Nevada Press. ISBN 978-0-87417-623-0.
- Watts, J.C. Jr.; Chriss Winston (2002). What Color is a Conservative?: My Life and My Politics. New York: Harper Collins. ISBN 978-0-06-093240-4.
- Waxman, Henry A.; Joshua Green (2009). The Waxman Report: How Congress Really Works. New York: Twelve (Hachette Book Group). ISBN 0446519251 (pbk); ISBN 978-0-446-51925-0. Originally published: 2009.
- Whitehurst, G. William (1983). Diary of a Congressman. Norfolk: The Donning Company. ISBN 978-0-89865-335-9.
- Wright, Jim (1984). Reflections of a Public Man. Fort Worth: Madison Publishing Company.
- Wright, Jim (1993). Worth It All: My War for Peace. Washington D.C.: Brassey's. ISBN 978-0-02-881075-1.
- Young, Andrew (1994). A Way Out of No Way: The Spiritual Memoirs of Andrew Young. Nashville: Thomas Nelson Publishers. ISBN 978-0-7852-7508-4.

== See also ==
- U.S. senator bibliography (congressional memoirs)
- List of American political memoirs
