= U.S. senator bibliography (congressional memoirs) =

Overview of United States congressional memoirs

Seal of the U.S. Senate

This is a bibliography of U.S. congressional memoirs by former and current U.S. senators.

The United States Senate is the upper house of the bicameral legislature of the United States, and together with the United States House of Representatives comprises the United States Congress. The composition and powers of the Senate are established in Article One of the U.S. Constitution. Each U.S. state is represented by two senators, regardless of population. Senators serve staggered six-year terms. The chamber of the United States Senate is located in the north wing of the Capitol, in Washington, D.C., the national capital. The House of Representatives convenes in the south wing of the same building.

== Congressional memoirs ==
External videos
- Booknotes interview with James Abourezk on Advise & Dissent, March 25, 1990, C-SPAN

- Abourezk, James G. (1989). Advise & Dissent: Memoirs of South Dakota and the U.S Senate. Chicago: Lawrence Hill Books. ISBN 978-1-55652-066-2.
- Aiken, George D. (1976). Senate Diary: January 1972-January 1975. Brattleboro, VT: Stephen Greene Press. ISBN 978-0-8289-0275-5.
- Akaka, Daniel (2017). One Voice: My Life, Times and Hopes for Hawaii. Honolulu: Watermark Publishing. ISBN 978-1935690924.
- Alexander, Lamar (1988). Six Months Off: An American Family's Australian Adventure. New York: Quill/William Morrow. ISBN 978-0-8161-4846-2.
- Alexander, Lamar (1986). Steps Along The Way: A Governor's Scrapbook. Nashville: T. Nelson. ISBN 978-0-8407-4215-5.
- Alexander, Lamar (1995). We Know What To Do: A Political Maverick Talks With America. New York: W. Morrow and Co. ISBN 978-0-688-14288-9.
- Anderson, Clinton P; Milton Viorst (1970). Outsider in the Senate: Senator Clinton Anderson's Memoirs. New York: World Publishing Co.
- Ashcroft, John (1998). Lessons From a Father to His Son. Nashville: Thomas Nelson Publishers. ISBN 978-0-7852-7540-4.
- Ashcroft, John (2006). Never Again: Securing America and Restoring Justice. Nashville: Center Street. ISBN 1-59995-680-2.
- Ashcroft, John (2001). On My Honor: The Beliefs that Shape My Life. Nashville: Thomas Nelson Publishers. ISBN 978-0-7852-6643-3.
- Baker, Howard (1982). Howard Baker's Washington: An Intimate Portrait of the Nation's Capital City. New York: W. W. Norton Co. ISBN 978-0-393-01562-1.
- Barkley, Alben W. (1954). That Reminds Me. Garden City, NY: Doubleday & Co.
- Bayh, Evan (2003). From Father to Son: A Private Life in the Public Eye. Indianapolis, IN: Guild Press Emmis Books. ISBN 978-1-57860-119-6.
- Bellmon, Henry (1992). The Life and Times of Henry Bellmon. Tulsa, OK: Council Oak Books. ISBN 978-0-933031-47-0.
- Boxer, Barbara (1994). Strangers in the Senate: Politics and the New Revolution of Women in America. Washington, D.C.: National Press Books. ISBN 978-1-882605-06-4.
- Boxer, Barbara (2016). The Art of Tough: Fearlessly Facing Politics and Life. New York: Grand Central Publishing. ISBN 978-0316311465.
- Bradley, Bill (1996). Time Present, Time Past. New York: Knopf. ISBN 0-679-76815-7.
- Bradley, Bill (2000). The Journey from Here. New York: Artisan. ISBN 1-57965-165-8.
- Brooke, Edward W. (2006). Bridging the Divide: My Life. Piscataway, NJ: Rutgers University Press. ISBN 978-0-8135-3905-8.
- Brooke (1966). The Challenge of Change: Crisis in Our Two-Party System. Boston: Little, Brown & Co.
- Buckley, James Lane (2006). Gleanings from an Unplanned Life: An Annotated Oral History. Wilmington, DE: Intercollegiate Studies Institute. ISBN 1-933859-11-3.
- Buckley, James Lane (1975). If Men Were Angels: A View From the Senate. New York: G. P. Putnam's Sons. ISBN 978-0-399-11589-9.
- Bumpers, Dale (2003). The Best Lawyer in a One-Lawyer Town: A Memoir. New York: Random House. ISBN 0-375-50521-0.
- Byrd, Robert C. (2005). Robert C. Byrd: Child of the Appalachian Coalfields. Morgantown: West Virginia University Press. ISBN 1-933202-00-9.
- Byrnes, James F. (1958). All in One Lifetime. New York: Harper.
- Byrnes, James F. (1947). Speaking Frankly. New York: Harper.
- Carnahan, Jean (2004). Don't Let the Fire Go Out!. Columbia, MO: University of Missouri Press. ISBN 0-8262-1513-0.
- Clark, Richard “Dick”. Iowa And The World.
- Clinton, Hillary Rodham (2003). Living History. New York: Simon & Schuster. ISBN 0-7432-2224-5.
- Clinton, Hillary Rodham (2014). Hard Choices. New York: Simon & Schuster. ISBN 978-1-4767-5144-3.
- Cohen, William S. (1981). Roll Call: One Year in the United States Senate. New York: Simon & Schuster. ISBN 978-0-670-82252-2.
- Cohen, William S.; George J. Mitchell (1988). Men of Zeal: A Candid Inside Story of the Iran-Contra Hearings. New York: Viking. ISBN 978-0-670-82252-2.
- Cotton, Norris (1978). In the Senate: Amidst the Conflict and Turmoil. New York: Dodd, Mead and Company. ISBN 978-0-396-07571-4.
- D'Amato, Alfonse (1995). Power, Pasta, & Politics: The World According to Senator Al D'Amato. New York: Hyperion. ISBN 978-0-7868-6045-6.
- Danforth, John C. (2006). Faith and Politics: How the "Moral Values" Debate Divides America and How to Move Forward Together. New York: Viking Books. ISBN 978-0-670-03787-2.
- Danforth, John C. (1994). Resurrection: The Confirmation of Clarence Thomas. New York: Viking. ISBN 978-0-670-86022-7.

External videos
- Booknotes interview with Tom Daschle on Like No Other Time: The 107th Congress and the Two Years That Changed America, November 30, 2003, C-SPAN

- Daschle, Tom; Michael D'Orso (2003). Like No Other Time: The 107th Congress and the Two Years that Changed America Forever. New York: Crown Publishers. ISBN 978-1-4000-4955-4.
- Dirksen, Everett M. (1998). The Education of a Senator. Urbana: University of Illinois Press. ISBN 978-0-252-02414-6.
- Dole, Elizabeth (2004). Hearts Touched with Fire: My 500 Favorite Inspirational Quotations. New York: Carroll & Graf. ISBN 978-0-7867-1428-5.
- Dole, Robert J. (1998). Great Political Wit: Laughing (Almost) All the Way to the White House. New York: Nan A. Talese. ISBN 978-0-7679-0667-8.
- Dole, Robert J.; Elizabeth Dole; Richard Norton Smith; Kerry Tymchuck (1996). Unlimited Partners: Our American Story. New York: Simon & Schuster. ISBN 978-0-684-83401-6.
- Douglas, Paul H (1972). In the Fullness of Time: The Memoirs of Paul H. Douglas. New York: Harcourt Brace Jovanovich. ISBN 978-0-15-144376-5.
- Ervin, Sam (1984). Preserving the Constitution: An Autobiography of Senator Sam Ervin. Charlottesville, VA: Mitchie Co. ISBN 978-0-87215-781-1.
- Garn, Jake (1992). Why I Believe. Salt Lake City: Aspen Books. ISBN 978-1-56236-200-3.
- Gillibrand, Kirsten (2014). Off the Sidelines: Raise Your Voice, Change the World. New York City: Ballantine Books. ISBN 978-0804179072.
- Glenn, John; Nick Taylor (1999). John Glenn: A Memoir. New York: Bantam Books. ISBN 978-0-553-11074-6.
- Goldwater, Barry M. (1960). The Conscience of a Conservative. Shepherdsville, KY: Victor Publishing Co. ISBN 1-56849-140-9.
- Goldwater, Barry M. (1988). Goldwater. Garden City, New York: Doubleday. ISBN 0-385-23947-5.
- Goldwater, Barry M. (1979). With No Apologies: The Personal and Political Memoirs of United States Senator Barry M. Goldwater. New York: William Morrow Co. ISBN 978-0-688-03547-1.
- Gore, Albert Sr. (1972). Let the Glory Out: My South and Its Politics. New York: Viking Press. ISBN 978-1-58818-028-5.
- Gruening, Ernest (1973). Many Battles: The Autobiography of Ernest Gruening. New York: Liveright Publishing Corp. ISBN 978-0-87140-565-4.
- Harris, Fred R. (1968). Alarms and Hopes: A Personal Journey, a Personal View. New York: Harper & Row.
- Harris, Fred R. (1995). In Defense of Congress. New York: St. Martin's Press. ISBN 978-0-312-09456-0.
- Harris, Fred R. (1977). Potomac Fever. New York: W. W. Norton & Co. ISBN 978-0-393-05610-5.
- Hart, Gary (1993). The Good Fight: The Education of an American Reformer. New York: Random House. ISBN 978-0-679-41988-4.
- Hart, Gary (1996). The Patriot: An Exhortation to Liberate America from the Barbarians. New York: Free Press. ISBN 978-0-684-86376-4.
- Hart, Gary (1973). Right from the Start: A Chronicle of the McGovern Campaign. New York: Quadrangle. ISBN 978-0-8129-0372-0.
- Hatch, Orrin (2002). Square Peg: Confessions of a Citizen Senator. New York: Basic Books. ISBN 978-0-465-02867-2.
- Hatfield, Mark; Diane N. Solomon (2001). Against the Grain: Reflections of a Rebel Republican. Ashland, OR: White Cloud Press. ISBN 978-1-883991-36-4.
- Helms, Jesse (2005). Here's Where I Stand: A Memoir. New York: Random House. ISBN 978-0-375-50884-4.
- Humphrey, Hubert Horatio Jr. (1991). Norman Sherman (ed.). The Education of a Public Man: My Life and Politics. Minneapolis: University of Minnesota Press. ISBN 978-0-8166-1897-2.
- Hutchison, Kay Bailey (2004). American Heroines: The Spirited Women Who Shaped Our Country. New York: William Morrow. ISBN 978-0-06-056635-7.
- Inouye, Daniel K.; Lawrence Elliott (1967). Journey to Washington. Englewood Cliffs, NJ: Prentice-Hall.
- Javits, Jacob K.; Rafael Steinberg. (1981). Javits: The Autobiography of a Public Man. Boston: Houghton Mifflin Co. ISBN 978-0-395-29912-8.
- Jeffords, James M. (2003). An Independent Man: Adventures of a Public Servant. New York: Simon & Schuster. ISBN 978-0-7432-2843-5.
- Jeffords, James M. (2001). My Declaration of Independence. New York: Simon & Schuster. ISBN 978-0-7432-2842-8.
- Kennedy, Edward M. (2009). True Compass: A Memoir. New York: Twelve. ISBN 978-0446539258.
- Kerrey, Robert (2002). When I Was a Young Man: A Memoir. New York: Harcourt, Inc. ISBN 978-0-15-100474-4.
- Kerry, John (2003). A Call to Service: My Vision for a Better America. New York: Penguin Books. ISBN 978-0-670-03260-0.
- Kerry, John (2018). Every Day is Extra. New York: Simon & Schuster. ISBN 978-1501178955.
- Caraway, Hattie (1979). Diane D. Kincaid (ed.). Silent Hattie Speaks: The Personal Journal of Senator Hattie Caraway. Westport, CT: Greenwood Press. ISBN 0-313-20820-4.
- Laxalt, Paul (1999). Nevada's Paul Laxalt: A Memoir. Reno, NV: Jack Bacon & Co. ISBN 0-930083-09-1.
- Leahy, Patrick (2022). The Road Taken: A Memoir. New York: Simon & Schuster. ISBN 978-1982157357.
- Levin, Carl (2021). Getting to the Heart of the Matter: My 36 Years in the Senate. Detroit: Wayne State University Press. ISBN 978-0814348390.
- Lieberman, Joseph (2000). In Praise of Public Life. New York: Simon & Schuster. ISBN 0-684-86774-5.
- Lodge, Henry Cabot (1925). The Senate of the United States, and Other Essays and Addresses Historical and Literary. New York: Charles Scribner's Sons.
- Lott, Trent (2005). Herding Cats: A Life in Politics. New York: Regan Books. ISBN 978-0-06-059931-7.
- McCain, John; Mark Salter (1999). Faith of My Fathers. New York: Random House. ISBN 0-375-50191-6.
- McCain, John; Mark Salter (2002). Worth the Fighting For: A Memoir. New York: Random House. ISBN 0-375-50542-3.
- McCarthy, Eugene (1987). Up'til Now: A Memoir. San Diego: Harcourt Brace Jovanovich. ISBN 0-15-193170-4.
- McClellan, John L. (1976). Crime Without Punishment. Westport, CT: Greenwood Press. ISBN 0-8371-8708-7.
- McConnell, Mitch (2016). The Long Game: A Memoir. New York: Penguin Publishing Group. ISBN 978-0399564116.
- McGee, Gale (1968). The Responsibilities of World Power. Washington D.C.: National Press.
- McGovern, George S. (1974). An American Journey: The Presidential Campaign Speeches of George McGovern. New York: Random House. ISBN 978-0-394-48944-5.
- McGovern, George S. (1977). Grassroots: The Autobiography of George McGovern. New York: Random House. ISBN 978-0-394-41941-1.
- McKellar, Kenneth (1942). Tennessee Senators As Seen By One of Their Successors. Kingsport, TN: Southern Publishers.
- Maclay, William (1988). Kenneth R. Bowling, Helen E. Veit (ed.). The Journal of William Maclay and Other Notes on Senate Debates. Documentary History of the First Federal Congress of the United States of America, 4 March 1789-3 March 1791, vol. 9. Baltimore: Johns Hopkins University Press.
- Mangum, Willie (1950–1956). Henry Shanks (ed.). Willie Mangum Papers 5 vols. Raleigh: North Carolina Department of Archives and History.
- Martin, Edward (1959). Always Be On Time: An Autobiography. Harrisburg: Telegraph Press.
- Mitchell, George (1999). Making Peace. New York: Knopf. ISBN 0-520-22523-6.
- Mitchell, George J. (1997). Not for America Alone: The Triumph of Democracy and the Fall of Communism. New York: Kodansha International. ISBN 978-1-56836-083-6.
- Murphy, George; Victor Lasky (1970). Say…..Didn't You Used to be George Murphy?. New York: Bartholomew House. ISBN 978-0-87794-024-1.
- Muskie, Edmund (1972). Journeys. Garden City, NY: Doubleday & Co.
- Nelson, Ben (2021). Death of the Senate: My Front Row Seat to the Demise of the World's Greatest Deliberative Body. Lincoln, Nebraska: University of Nebraska Press. ISBN 978-1640124943.
- Nelson, Bill; Jamie Buckingham (1988). Mission: An American Congressman's Voyage to Space. San Diego, CA: Harcourt Brace Jovanovich. ISBN 978-0-15-105556-2.
- Norris, George (1961). Fighting Liberal: The Autobiography of George W. Norris 1945. New York: Collier Books.
- Obama, Barack (1995). Dreams From My Father: A Story of Race and Inheritance. New York: Times Books. ISBN 978-1-4000-8277-3.
- Pepper, Claude D.; Hays Gorey (1987). Pepper-Eyewitness to a Century. San Diego: Harcourt Brace Jovanovich. ISBN 978-0-15-171695-1.
- Pressler, Larry (1982). U.S. Senators from the Prairie. Vermillion, SD: Dakota Press. ISBN 0-88249-033-8.
- Quayle, Dan (1994). Standing Firm: A Vice-Presidential Memoir. New York: HarperCollins Publishers. ISBN 0-06-017758-6.
- Quayle, Dan (1999). Worth Fighting For. Nashville: W Publishing Group. ISBN 0-8499-1606-2.
- Quayle, Dan; Medved, Diane (1996). The American Family: Discovering the Values That Make Us Strong. Scranton: HarperCollins Publishers. ISBN 978-0-06-017378-4.
- Reid, Harry; Warren, Mark (2009). The Good Fight: Hard Lessons from Searchlight to Washington. New York: Penguin Publishing Group. ISBN 978-0425227572.
- Riegle, Donald; Trevor Armbrister (1972). O Congress. Garden City, NY: Doubleday & Co. ISBN 978-0-385-05402-7.
- Rudman, Warren B. (1996). Combat: Twelve Years in the U.S. Senate. New York: Random House. ISBN 978-0-679-44135-9.
- Saltonstall, Leverett; Edward Weeks (1976). Salty: Recollections of a Yankee in Politics. Boston: Boston Globe.
- Saxbe, William B. (2000). I've Seen the Elephant: An Autobiography. Kent, OH: Kent State University Press. ISBN 978-0-87338-668-5.
- Scott, Hugh D. Jr. (1968). How to Run for Public Office and Win!. Washington, D.C.: National Press.
- Sherman, John (1968). Recollections of Forty Years in the House, Senate, and Cabinet. 1895. Reprint. 2 vols. New York: Greenwood Press.

External videos
- Booknotes interview with Paul Simon on Advice and Consent: Clarence Thomas, Robert Bork and the Intriguing History of the Supreme Court's Nomination Battles, September 20, 1992, C-SPAN

- Simon, Paul (1992). Advice and Consent: Clarence Thomas, Robert Bork, and the Intriguing History of the Supreme Court's Nomination Battles. Washington D.C.: National Press Books. ISBN 978-0-915765-98-0.
- Simon, Paul (1999). P.S.: The Autobiography of Paul Simon. Chicago: Bonus Books. ISBN 1-56625-112-5.
- Simpson, Alan K. (1997). Right in the Old Gazoo: A Lifetime of Scrapping with the Press. New York: William Morrow & Co. ISBN 978-0-688-11358-2.

External videos
- Booknotes interview with Arlen Specter on Passion for Truth, January 28, 2001, C-SPAN

- Specter, Arlen (2000). Passion for Truth: From Finding JFK's Single Bullet to Questioning Anita Hill to Impeaching Clinton. New York: William Morrow. ISBN 978-0-06-019849-7.
- Smith, Margaret Chase (1972). Declaration of Conscience. Garden City, New York: Doubleday.
- Stewart, William M. (1908). George Rothwell Brown (ed.). Reminiscences of Senator William M. Stewart of Nevada. New York: Neale Publishing Co.
- Talmadge, Herman E.; Mark Royden Winchell (1987). Talmadge, a Political Legacy, a Politician's Life: A Memoir. Atlanta: Peachtree Publishers. ISBN 978-0-934601-23-8.
- Thompson, Fred D. (1975). At That Point in Time: The Inside Story of the Senate Watergate Committee. New York: Quadrangle New York Times Book Co. ISBN 978-0-8129-0536-6.
- Tower, John (1991). Consequences: A Personal and Political Memoir. Boston: Little, Brown & Co. ISBN 978-0-316-85113-8.
- Tracy, Uriah (1803). To the Freemen of Connecticut. Litchfield: Thomas Collier.
- Tsongas, Paul (1984). Heading Home. New York: Alfred A. Knopf. ISBN 978-0-679-74307-1.
- Underwood, Oscar W. (1928). Drifting Sand of Party Politics. New York: The Century Co.
- Vandenberg, Arthur Hendrick (1974). The Private Papers of Senator Vandenberg. Westport, CT: Greenwood Press.
- Vinson, Carl (2002). Carl Vinson: A Legacy of Public Service. Athens, GA: Carl Vinson Institute of Government, University of Georgia. ISBN 978-0-89854-208-0.
- Warren, Elizabeth Warren (2014). A Fighting Chance. Massachusetts: Metropolitan Books. ISBN 978-1627790529.
- Weicker, Lowell P. Jr.; Barry Sussman. (1995). Maverick: A Life in Politics. Boston: Little, Brown, & Co. ISBN 978-0-316-92814-4.
- Wellstone, Paul D. (2001). The Conscience of a Liberal: Reclaiming the Compassionate Agenda. New York: Random House. ISBN 978-0-679-46294-1.
- Wofford, Harris (1992). Of Kennedys and Kings: Making Sense of the Sixties. 1980. Pittsburgh: University of Pittsburgh Press. ISBN 978-0-8229-5808-6.
- Young, Stephen M. (1964). Tales Out of Congress. Philadelphia: J. B. Lippincott Co.

== See also ==
- U.S. representative bibliography (congressional memoirs)
- List of American political memoirs
