= Greg Mitchell =

American author and journalist (born 1947)

- Born: 1947 (age 78–79) Upstate New York, U.S.
- Occupation: Author, journalist
- Genre: Politics, history, journalism

Greg Mitchell (born 1947) is an American author and journalist. He has written twelve non-fiction books on United States politics and history of the 20th and 21st centuries. He has also written and directed five film documentaries, all distributed since 2022 by PBS.

The feature Atomic Cover-up (2021) screened at over fifteen film festivals and won multiple awards including the top film/TV award from the Organization of American Historians in 2024. The First Attack Ads: Hollywood vs. Upton Sinclair aired over hundreds of PBS stations in October 2022 and The Memorial Day Massacre did the same in 2023 as well as "The Atomic Bowl" in 2025. Each earned an Emmy Award nomination. His latest film, narrated by Rosanne Cash, "Woody Guthrie and the Ghost of Tom Joad Today" will come to PBS in July 2026. His latest book, published by the New Press in 2020, was the award-winning The Beginning or the End: How Hollywood — and America — Learned to Stop Worrying and Love the Bomb. His previous book, a bestseller, was published by Crown in October 2016 (and in ten editions abroad), was The Tunnels: Escapes Under the Berlin Wall and the Historic Films the JFK White House Tried to Kill. From 2009 to 2016 he blogged on the media and politics for The Nation, where he closely covered WikiLeaks. He co-produced the acclaimed 2014 film documentary Following the Ninth, about the political and cultural influence of Beethoven's Ninth Symphony.

In three recent books, he has addressed issues of the relations between the press and government, especially related to the conduct of the 21st-century United States wars in Iraq and Afghanistan. His book, The Campaign of the Century (1992), about Upton Sinclair's run for governor of California and the rise of media politics, received the 1993 Goldsmith Book Prize for journalism. It was adapted by PBS as a documentary episode for its seven-part series on The Great Depression (1993). In addition, it was adapted as a vaudeville-style musical and received an award in California in 2006 for musical theatre.

Mitchell was editor of Nuclear Times magazine (1982 to 1986), and became interested in the history of the United States' use of the atom bomb during World War II. He addressed issues related to this in a 1996 book co-written with Robert Jay Lifton, Hiroshima in America, and a later book, Atomic Cover-up.

== Early life and education ==
Greg Mitchell was born in 1947 in Upstate New York.

== Career ==
He first worked in journalism as a summer intern for the Niagara Falls Gazette (now the Niagara Gazette).

In the 1970s, Mitchell began working for Crawdaddy! magazine, where he became a senior editor. With fellow editor Peter Knobler, Mitchell is credited with helping to create in December 1972 and publish the first magazine article about the now-prominent musician Bruce Springsteen. They first met Springsteen and watched him perform at a promo gig in Sing Sing Prison before his first album was released.

Mitchell served as editor of Nuclear Times magazine from 1982 to 1986. He has written numerous articles about the atomic bombings during World War II, published in magazines and newspapers including The New York Times and The Washington Post. His book on how the U.S. suppressed shocking footage shot by American military film crews in Hiroshima and Nagasaki, Atomic Cover-Up, was published in 2011.

He was the editor of Editor & Publisher (E&P) (2002 through 2009), which covers the news and newspaper industry.

Mitchell is co-author with Robert Jay Lifton of Hiroshima in America: A Half Century of Denial (1996) on the perceptions in the United States of the nuclear bombing of Hiroshima and Nagasaki during World War II. In an interview, he discussed the long-censored stories of the Chicago Tribune correspondent George Weller, the first Western news reporter to reach Nagasaki after the atomic bombing.

He wrote a second book with Lifton about capital punishment, called Who Owns Death? (2002).

Mitchell has written two books about notable California political campaigns: The Campaign of the Century (1992) examined Upton Sinclair's race for governor in 1934 and the birth of media-driven elections. PBS adapted it as "We Have a Plan", the fourth of seven documentary episodes featured in The Great Depression (1993) series, produced and directed by Lyn Goldfarb. In 2011 the book was republished in new print and e-book editions. It was also adapted as a vaudeville-style musical and first produced in a concert version at the Chicago Humanities Festival in 2004. The book is by Robert L. Freedman, lyrics by Freedman and Steven Lutvak, and music by Lutvak. In 2006 it won the California Musical Theatre Award from the Beverly Hills Theatre Guild.

Mitchell's Tricky Dick and the Pink Lady: Richard Nixon Vs Helen Gahagan Douglas — Sexual Politics and the Red Scare, 1950 (1998) studies an era in California politics as it reflected and influenced national issues in the post-World War II years. He also wrote an e-book on the Obama-Romney race in 2012 titled Truth, Lies, and Videotape.

Three of Mitchell's recent books have dealt with relations between the press and government, inspired in part by revelations of Bush administration misdirection related to justification of the War in Iraq, as well as issues related to the WikiLeaks scandal. These are So Wrong for So Long: How the Press, the Pundits—and the President—Failed in Iraq (2008)—re-published as an e-book in 2013, Bradley Manning: Truth and Consequences (2011, coauthor with Kevin Gosztola), and The Age of WikiLeaks (2011).

Mitchell writes a regular Substack newsletter on music and politics — Between Rock and a Hard Place.

== Views on news coverage ==
In 2003 and 2004, Mitchell wrote and spoke about issues in journalistic integrity. In an E&P column in 2003, Mitchell wrote about having made up some quotes in a man-in-the-street article at age 21, while working as a summer intern (what he described as his Jayson Blair moment). He was then working for the Niagara Falls (N.Y.) Gazette (now the Niagara Gazette) and assigned to gather quotes from tourists at Niagara Falls. He wrote that he and other journalists learn from their mistakes.

In a 2004 interview with the Echo Chamber Project, Mitchell discussed the duty of news reporters to be "skeptical." He cited coverage of the Bush administration's justification of the 2003 War in Iraq as a failure of the media to exercise skepticism. He said,

[A]ll our coverage on all subjects—is not to be partisan or not to be left or right or anything like that. But we believe in the—what should be the main principle of journalism, besides being accurate and fair, is to be skeptical—to raise questions, to not take what officials say as the gospel truth—unless it's really proven—if there's documents.

Whether covering Washington or a small town, Mitchell said,

[T]he journalistic principle is the same: to be skeptical unless there's hard evidence and proof. And you report what someone says—"It's their claim." "It's what they say." "It's what they allege." "It's what they're trying to prove." But you don't present these things as fact if you're not sure they're fact. And what happened with the Iraq coverage was that too often newspapers—and especially television—went with stories that were based on official claims, and in retrospect, were really propaganda. Because in some cases, the officials were well-meaning. Maybe they thought that they had the evidence. But in other cases, they knew their evidence was incredibly shaky—or should have known—and yet went with the evidence claiming it was fact. And the press just, in most cases, accepted it.

== Personal life ==
From his first marriage, Mitchell has a daughter Jeni, who lives in London.

After the divorce, he married the writer Barbara Bedway. They live in Nyack, New York. The couple has a son, Andy, who has become a filmmaker. Mitchell wrote about their experiences in Little League baseball in his memoir Joy in Mudville (2000).

== Awards ==
- Winner of the 1993 Goldsmith Book Prize for The Campaign of the Century, Joan Shorenstein Center, Harvard Kennedy School

== Books ==
- The Beginning or the End: How Hollywood―and America―Learned to Stop Worrying and Love the Bomb (2020)
- The Tunnels: Escapes Under the Berlin Wall and the Historic Films the JFK White House Tried to Kill (2016)
- Atomic Cover-Up: Two U.S. Soldiers, Hiroshima & Nagasaki, and The Greatest Movie Never Made (2011)
- The Age of WikiLeaks (2011)
- Bradley Manning: Truth and Consequences (2011)
- So Wrong for So Long: How the Press, the Pundits — and the President — Failed in Iraq (2008)
- October Light: Paris and Auvers, photographs by Greg Mitchell (2006)
- Joy in Mudville: A Little League Memoir (2000/2002)
- Tricky Dick and the Pink Lady: Richard Nixon Vs Helen Gahagan Douglas — Sexual Politics and the Red Scare, 1950 (1998)
- Very Seventies: A Cultural History of the 1970s, from the Pages of Crawdaddy, ed. Peter Knobler and Greg Mitchell (1995)
- The Campaign of the Century: Upton Sinclair's E.P.I.C. Race for Governor of California and the Birth of Media Politics (1992) Reissued in 2011 in print and e-book editions as The Campaign of the Century: Upton Sinclair's Race for Governor of California and the Birth of Media Politics)
- Truth and Consequences: 7 Who Would Not Be Silenced (1987)

=== With Robert Jay Lifton ===
- Who Owns Death?: Capital Punishment, the American Conscience, and the End of Executions (2002)
- Hiroshima in America: A Half Century of Denial (1996)
