= Nuclear Times =

Magazine devoted to nuclear disarmament

- Editor: John Tirman (1990–1992)
- Former editors: Greg Mitchell (1982–1986); Elliott Negin (1986–1989)
- Categories: Anti-nuclear movement
- Frequency: (initially) Monthly (later) 6 times per year
- Publisher: Jack Berkowitz
- First issue: Oct 1982
- Final issue: 1992
- Company: Nuclear Times, Inc.
- Country: United States
- Based in: New York City, then Washington, D.C., then Boston
- Language: English
- ISSN: 0734-5836

Nuclear Times was a magazine devoted to nuclear disarmament that was published from 1982 to 1992. "Devoted to education between and communication among peace activists," contributors to the magazine included "journalists, scholars, and activists." The magazine was noted for its practice of listing "organizational resources keyed to each issue's articles." Nuclear Times was characterized by The New York Times as "the peace movement's most popular magazine."

The magazine is not related to a later e-newsletter published by the United Steelworkers to "share the latest news and information for atomic workers in the United States and Canada."

== Publication history ==
=== Launch ===
Nuclear Times was launched in October 1982, with Greg Mitchell serving as the publication's first editor.

Set up as a nonprofit, members of the magazine's board of directors included Hodding Carter III, Adam Hochschild, Anne Mollegen Smith, and Thomas Powers.

In a United Press International article about the magazine's launch, Nuclear Times claimed to be "the first of its kind, devoted exclusively to reporting on the grass-roots disarmament movement." It said it would "provide both in-depth and independent coverage of the personalities, events, and issues comprising the growing anti-nuclear weapons movement."

The magazine's first issue "include[d] a report on the status of nuclear freeze referendums, an opinion column, an essay on 'Bringing the Bomb Home', and a calendar of upcoming anti-nuclear activities throughout the country."

Nuclear Times was supported by subscribers, advertising, and foundation support; "it received a total of $74,300 [in foundation support] in 1984," with the largest contribution coming from the Field Foundation of New York.

=== Closure ===
The magazine suspended publication in August 1989, essentially put out of business by the peace movement's own success — the relaxing of tensions in the Cold War.

=== Relaunch and demise ===
The magazine was revived by a new, Boston-based, publisher in 1990, with John Tirman at the head. In a 1991 round-up, author Grant Burns described how the magazine had...

evolved to serve as a wide-angle guide to the antiwar and antinuclear movements. It retains a primary focus on nuclear weapons and nuclear war issues, but also features commentary and assessments concerning political and military hotspots around the world (e.g., the Soviet crackdown in the Baltics, militarism in Japan, the Persian Gulf) that harbor the potential for far wider conflict. On the nuclear front, the magazine has recently featured articles on proliferation, nuclear deterrence in the context of the declining Cold War, and nuclear test protests in the Soviet Union.

The relaunched Nuclear Times lasted two years before permanently ceasing publication in 1992.

== Between Fear and Hope ==
Nuclear Times managing editor Sonia Shah edited Between Fear and Hope: A Decade of Peace Activism Compiled from Nuclear Times Magazine, 1982 to Present, published by Fortkamp Publishing Company in January 1992. In a review, the Bulletin of the Atomic Scientists wrote, "The book ... is very useful for students of social movement strategy and communication, and it is a handy, accessible resource for organizers working for common security. Between Fear & Hope advances our knowledge of one of the largest and most important social movements in recent U.S. history."

== Notable staff ==
- David Corn, associate editor/senior editor/contributing editor (1982–c. 1987)
- Sonia Shah, managing editor (1990–1992)
