= Dissipated Eight =

American a capella group

The Dissipated Eight
- The Original Dissipated Eight (1952)

Background information
- Origin: Middlebury, Vermont
- Genre: A Cappella
- Years active: 1952–present
- Members: Owen "Shots" Kelliher (Music Director), Quinn "Squinn" Donaldson, Will "Bugs" Dyer, Caeden Frederickson, Graeme "Grigma" Evans, Nate "Bing" Keshen, Rabih "Conk" Abboud, Jack "Ja'Squeal" O'Neill, Jeff "Walla-Walla" Adams-Lopez, Leo "Kit-Kat" Katowitz, Henry Dejanikus, Nick Christoforakis
- Website: www.dissipatedeight.com

Middlebury's Dissipated Eight, also known as the D8, is the oldest a cappella group at Middlebury College. (Note: As of 2015, it was the fourth oldest a cappella group in the United States.) Its first performance was on March 15, 1952. The group has recorded multiple albums over its nearly 75-year history, and performs both nationally and internationally, at private venues, colleges, and high schools alike. Over the years, the group has arranged numerous contemporary and modern pieces, and now has more than 200 recorded covers of popular music.

They generally do not use any instruments in their recordings, and instead carefully select different pitches to simulate the tones needed for each song. This often means recreating sounds such as the high-pitched tone of the fiddle in "The Devil Went Down To Georgia" or the bass and snare of the drum set in "All Along The Watchtower."

Several former members of the Dissipated Eight have gone on to gain national prominence, including international opera performer William Burden, television and film actor Jake Weber, and author/editor Peter Knobler.

== Origin ==
Formed in the Fall of 1951, the original group consisted of seven singers, including Pete Baldwin (Tenor I), Ellis Baker and Les Streeter (Tenor II), Bob Johnson and Pete Gray (Baritone), and John Ackerman and Ed Opler (Bass). By February, the seven were practicing regularly in Painter and Hepburn Halls. However, it was not until March 15, 1952 that the D8 performed its debut concert at the Ides of March Dance. Later that spring, the group performed at a radio broadcasting where the WRMC announcer, Bob Arel, noting the double quartet (which had no name at the time) was short by one, jokingly introduced the group as "The Dissipated Eight." The following year, the group added four new members Mint Dole (Tenor I), John Hammond and Jack Harrington (Baritone), and Seward Highley (Bass) to replace the graduating seniors Bob Johnson, Pete Gray, and Ed Opler. Today, the Dissipated Eight continues on in the tradition of the original octet, maintaining the example of energetic dedication established by the group's founding members while continuing to push the boundaries of a cappella as we know it. Producing numerous records over the years, the D8 has compiled a vast archive of music from the past five decades.

== Notable performances ==
In 1983, the Dissipated Eight performed on Garrison Keillor's Prairie Home Companion, when it was broadcast live from Mead Chapel at Middlebury College.

== Discography ==
The Dissipated Eight On Tour In Bermuda, March 2008

The Dissipated Eight has released eleven albums on LP Records.

- The Dissipated Eight of Middlebury (1955)
- Serenades (1958)
- Cruising Along With The Dissipated Eight (1961)
- Mem'ries of Most Happy Days (1964)
- Selections By The Eight (1967)
- Miss Otis (1971)
- D8 (1973)
- The White Album (1980)
- South Of The Border (1982)
- Very Special (1984)
- Pieces Of Eight (1987)

The Dissipated Eight has released fourteen albums on Compact Disc.

- Super 8 (1990)
- A Moveable Fest (1993)
- Clapping Joes (1996)
- Eighps (1997)
- Altitude (1999)
- No Sleep For Dreaming (2000)
- Eight Balls (2002)
- Golden Jubilee: 50 Years Of Dissipation (2002)
- Out Of The Ashes (2005)
- After Hours (2007)
- Vocally Grown (2009)
- Stand Up Eight (2011)
- Born and Bred (2014)
- Freight Train (2017)
- OCHO (2022)

The Dissipated Eight has released two albums on all streaming platforms.

- OCHO (2022)
- Careful, Now (2024)

In March 2022 production began on a 26th album commemorating the 70th anniversary of the group. The record was produced in Santa Teresa, Costa Rica and was released in September 2022.

In March 2024 the Dissipated Eight recorded their most recent body of work, an EP titled Careful, Now. This project was produced by former Pentatonix member and producer Avi Kaplan, engineered by Reid Leslie, and mixed by Ed Boyer. It is available on all streaming platforms as of September 14, 2024.

== Achievements ==
The Dissipated Eight has been featured three times on Best of College A Cappella (BOCA) compilations:

- 1997 - "For What It's Worth" (Buffalo Springfield)
- 1998 - "Satellite" (Dave Matthews Band)
- 2000 - "Windmills" (Toad the Wet Sprocket)

Two albums were designated "Male Collegiate Album of the Year" by The Contemporary A Cappella Society (CASA):

- 1997 - Clapping Joes
- 1998 - Eights

Three songs have won individual awards:

- "In the Meantime" (Performed by George Herpel on the album Eight Balls) was featured on the first Collegiate A Cappella Music Organization (CAMO) compilation "Top Shelf A Cappella."
- "A Wink and a Smile" (Performed by Chris Molina on the album Altitude) was selected for "Solo of the Year" by CASA in 2000.
- "Superstition" (Performed by Mike Olcott on the album Out Of The Ashes) was nominated for "Solo of the Year" by CASA in 2006.
