= A Sacred Oath =

Memoirs of Mark Esper

A Sacred Oath: Memoirs of a Secretary of Defense During Extraordinary Times is a book by Mark Esper, 27th United States Secretary of Defense which was published on May 10, 2022 by HarperCollins.

== Contents ==
In the book, Esper wrote that President Donald Trump wanted to launch a missile into Mexico.

He made many other claims about Trump. Among these claims, Esper asserts that, during a meeting in June 2020, Trump asked whether U.S. troops could shoot Black Lives Matter protesters; that Trump once called Esper, Vice President Mike Pence and General Mark Milley "fucking losers" after Milley told him that he had no command authority over the active duty and National Guard troops Trump wanted to deploy against protesters; and that an officer, whom Esper does not name, explored the possibility of invoking the Twenty-fifth Amendment to the United States Constitution to remove Trump from office after a May 2020 meeting of the Joint Chiefs of Staff.

== Critical receptions and reviews ==
Lloyd Green of The Guardian wrote "The ex-defense secretary’s memoir is scary and sobering – but don’t expect Republican leaders or voters to heed his warning" and John Bolton of The Wall Street Journal wrote "I still believe this. 'A Sacred Oath' is not a gratuitous tell-all. It is a work of history.".

The book has been also reviewed by Laura Miller of Slate and Thomas F. Lynch III of National Defense University.

The book was listed in The New York Times Best Seller list.
