= A Mayor's Life =

Autobiography of David N. Dinkins

A Mayor's Life: Governing New York's Gorgeous Mosaic
- Author: David N. Dinkins
- Genre: Memoir
- Publisher: PublicAffairs Books
- Publication date: September 17, 2013
- ISBN: 978-1-61-039301-0

A Mayor's Life: Governing New York's Gorgeous Mosaic is the autobiography of New York City's 106th mayor, David N. Dinkins, co-authored with Peter Knobler. Published in 2013 by PublicAffairs Books, the autobiography recounts the life and career of David Norman Dinkins, who defeated Ed Koch and Rudy Giuliani to become mayor of New York. The New York Times called it a "moving... inspiring account of New York's first black mayor." Set against the backdrop of the rise of Harlem's influence on city politics, which produced several state and national black leaders and energized the base that ultimately led to the election of President Barack Obama, A Mayor's Life deals with Dinkins' childhood in Trenton, NJ, his service in the U.S. Marine Corps, his education at Howard University and Brooklyn Law School, his political career beginning at the Carver Democratic Club and moving through jobs as City Clerk and Manhattan borough president to his election as mayor. Dinkins discusses his administration's successes, including an historic decrease in the city's crime rate; the cleanup of Times Square; the restoration of dilapidated housing in Northern Harlem, the South Bronx and Brooklyn; the deal to keep the US Tennis Open in New York City, which Mayor Michael Bloomberg has called "the only good athletic sports stadium deal, not just in New York but in the country"; and the hosting of Nelson Mandela on the South African diplomat's first international visit after being freed from prison. He also discusses its difficulties.

== Crown Heights ==
Dinkins presented a detailed analysis of the Crown Heights riot in Brooklyn. He wrote, “There was no order given, there was no unstated code, there was no tacit understanding, there was nothing anytime or anywhere that authorized the police not to do their jobs, to stand down, to allow the black community to attack Jews and create mayhem.”

== Racism ==
The New York Times said, "Mr. Dinkins offers insights into his views on race, a subject that he typically skirted as the city’s first African-American mayor, and into how being black shaped his personality." Dinkins accused his Republican opponent, Rudy Giuliani, of running a racist campaign but said that was not the only reason for his 1993 re-election loss.

== "Gorgeous Mosaic" ==
“New York is not a melting pot,” Dinkins wrote, “but a gorgeous mosaic... of race and religious faith, of national origin and sexual orientation – of individuals whose families arrived yesterday and generations ago, coming through Ellis Island, or Kennedy Airport, or on Greyhound buses bound for the Port Authority.”
