= Peter Knobler =

American writer living in New York City (born 1946)

- Born: 1946 (age 79–80); New York City, New York, U.S.
- Education: Middlebury College; Columbia University School of the Arts
- Occupations: Writer; Historian
- Writing career
- Genre: Non-fiction
- Subject: Biography

Peter Knobler (born 1946) is an American writer living in New York City. He has collaborated on fifteen books, ten of them best sellers and was the editor-in-chief of Crawdaddy magazine from 1972 to 1979, where he discovered Bruce Springsteen for the rock press and was the artist's earliest champion.

== Writing ==
Knobler specializes in collaboration, having written best-selling books with James Carville and Mary Matalin, Kareem Abdul-Jabbar, William Bratton, Texas Governor Ann Richards, Thomas "Hollywood" Henderson, Hakeem Olajuwon, Daniel Petrocelli, Tommy Hilfiger, and Sumner Redstone, among others. He worked with David Dinkins on the former New York City mayor's memoirs. His second book with Bill Bratton, The Profession: A Memoir of Community, Race, and the Arc of Policing in America, published by Penguin Press, was a New York Times Book Review Editors' Choice.

His individual writing has appeared in The Daily Beast, Sports Illustrated, More, Rolling Stone, and The New York Times sports and Guest Essay pages, and been collected in The Bob Dylan Companion, Racing in the Streets: The Bruce Springsteen Reader and The Subway Series Reader.

His piece "Dancing in the Dark," about Alzheimer's disease, klezmer music, and his mother, was published by the New England Review. His autobiographical piece examining implicit bias, "Walking While White," was published by the Fortnightly Review, as was his first piece of published fiction, the short story "The Right Side of the Diamond".

== Songwriting ==
Knobler has co-written songs with Chris Hillman, Steve Miller, Freedy Johnston, and the E Street Band's Garry Tallent. His songs have been recorded on Hillman's solo albums, by McGuinn, Clark & Hillman and the Desert Rose Band. The Hillman-Knobler song "Running the Roadblocks" reached the Billboard Hot Country Singles chart. The title song of the Oak Ridge Boys' Step on Out album was a Hillman-Knobler composition.

== Screenwriting ==
Knobler received a 2008-2009 Sports Emmy Award nomination for his work on the program Baseball's Golden Age. He has written championship films for the National Basketball Association and the United States Tennis Association.

== Crawdaddy ==
Knobler first wrote for Crawdaddy! under its original editor Paul Williams in 1968. (Crawdaddy! briefly suspended publication in 1969, then returned in 1970, with its title unpunctuated, as a monthly with national mass market distribution, first as a quarterfold newsprint tabloid, then as a standard-sized magazine.) He became editor-in-chief in 1972. Under Knobler the magazine included contributions from Joseph Heller, John Lennon, Tim O'Brien, Michael Herr, Gilda Radner, Dan Aykroyd, P.J. O'Rourke and Cameron Crowe, plus a roster of columnists including at times William S. Burroughs, Paul Krassner, The Firesign Theater, and sometimes Paul Williams himself. While on the run from the law, Abbie Hoffman was Crawdaddy's travel editor.

Crawdaddy was a generational magazine known for its profiles particularly of musicians, but also actors, athletes and other celebrities prominent in 1970s popular culture. Knobler's profiles included Bruce Springsteen, Sly Stone, Mel Brooks, Muddy Waters, Linda Ronstadt, Sylvester Stallone, Loudon Wainwright III, the Souther Hillman Furay Band, and Stephen Stills. Knobler was the first journalist to write about Springsteen. Under Knobler, Crawdaddy's editors often assigned artists to write about other artists; Al Kooper profiled Steve Martin, Martin Mull interviewed Woody Allen, William S. Burroughs talked magic and mysticism with Jimmy Page.

The record reviews section, driven by editors John Swenson and Noe Goldwasser, was respected by the music industry for its independence. Crawdaddy's features section regularly covered scenes from New Orleans funk to Austin, Texas' cosmic cowboys to Scientology, est and disco. Its sense of humor produced the Crawdoodah Gazette, The Whole Earth Conspiracy Catalogue and "The Assassination Please Almanac".

Knobler and Greg Mitchell collected a wide range of the magazine's articles in the book Very Seventies: A Cultural History of the 1970s from the pages of Crawdaddy, published in 1995.

== Bruce Springsteen ==
In December 1972, after seeing the performer play at Sing Sing prison and Kenny's Castaways, Knobler wrote the first interview and profile of Bruce Springsteen, with special assistance from Greg Mitchell. "He sings with a freshness and urgency I haven't heard since I was rocked by 'Like a Rolling Stone,'" Knobler wrote. Knobler's Crawdaddy discovered Springsteen in the rock press and was his earliest champion.. Springsteen and the E Street Band acknowledged by giving a private performance at the Crawdaddy 10th Anniversary Party in New York City in June 1976. Knobler profiled Springsteen in Crawdaddy in 1973, 1975, and 1978.

== Biography ==
Knobler was born and raised in New York City. He took part in the 1965 Selma to Montgomery march with Dr. Martin Luther King Jr. Knobler graduated in 1968 with a degree in English literature from Middlebury College. He sang bass in that school's a cappella group, the Dissipated Eight. Knobler has written for the college's alumni magazine. He attended the Columbia University School of the Arts, Creative Writing Division.

He briefly managed the career of saxophonist and E Street Band member Clarence Clemons in the 1980s.

Knobler is the father of Dan Knobler, Grammy-nominated producer, songwriter and guitarist in the bands Captain Coconut and Flearoy and co-founder of the audio/visual production company and creative collective Mason Jar Music. Dan Knobler's studio, Good Wishes, is located in Nashville, TN.

== Books ==
- The Profession: A Memoir of Community, Race, and the Arc of Policing in America, Bill Bratton and Peter Knobler (2021) Penguin, ISBN 978-0-525-55819-4
- American Dreamer, Tommy Hilfiger with Peter Knobler (2016) Ballantine, ISBN 978-1-101-88621-2
- A Mayor's Life: Governing New York's Gorgeous Mosaic, David N. Dinkins with Peter Knobler (2013), PublicAffairs, ISBN 978-1-61039-301-0
- Often Wrong, Never in Doubt: Unleash the Business Rebel Within, Donny Deutsch with Peter Knobler (2005), HarperCollins, ISBN 0-06-056719-8
- Fairy Tales Can Come True: How a Driven Woman Changed Her Destiny, Rikki Klieman with Peter Knobler (2003), HarperCollins, ISBN 0-06-052401-4
- A Passion to Win, Sumner Redstone with Peter Knobler (2001), Simon & Schuster, ISBN 0-684-86224-7
- Triumph of Justice: The Final Judgment on the Simpson Saga, Daniel Petrocelli with Peter Knobler (1998), Random House, ISBN 0-609-60170-9
- Turnaround: How America's Top Cop Reversed the Crime Epidemic, William Bratton with Peter Knobler (1998) Random House, ISBN 0-679-45251-6
- Living the Dream: My Life and Basketball, Hakeem Olajuwon with Peter Knobler (1996), Little, Brown ISBN 0-316-09427-7
- Very Seventies: A Cultural History of the 1970s from the pages of Crawdaddy, Peter Knobler and Greg Mitchell (1995), Fireside/Simon & Schuster, ISBN 0-02-022005-7
- All's Fair: Love, War, and Running for President, James Carville and Mary Matalin with Peter Knobler (1994), Random House, ISBN 0-679-43103-9
- A Matter of Honor: One Cop's Lifelong Pursuit of John Gotti and the Mob, Remo Franceschini (1993), Simon & Schuster, ISBN 0-671-73947-6
- Forgotten: A Sister's Struggle to Save Her Brother, America's Longest Held Hostage, Peggy Say with Peter Knobler (1991), Simon & Schuster, ISBN 0-671-70155-X
- Straight from the Heart: My Life in Politics & Other Places, Ann Richards with Peter Knobler (1989), Simon & Schuster, ISBN 0-671-68073-0
- Out of Control: Confessions of an NFL Casualty, Thomas "Hollywood" Henderson with Peter Knobler (1987), Bantam, ISBN 0-399-13264-3
- Giant Steps, Kareem Abdul-Jabbar with Peter Knobler (1983) Bantam, ISBN 0-553-27147-4

== Podcast ==
- Songs I Send My Son That He Sends Immediately to Spam episodes 1 and 2

== See also ==
- List of people from New York City
- Lists of writers
